= East Bayfront =

Coordinates: 43.64499°N 79.36459°W

- Neighbourhood
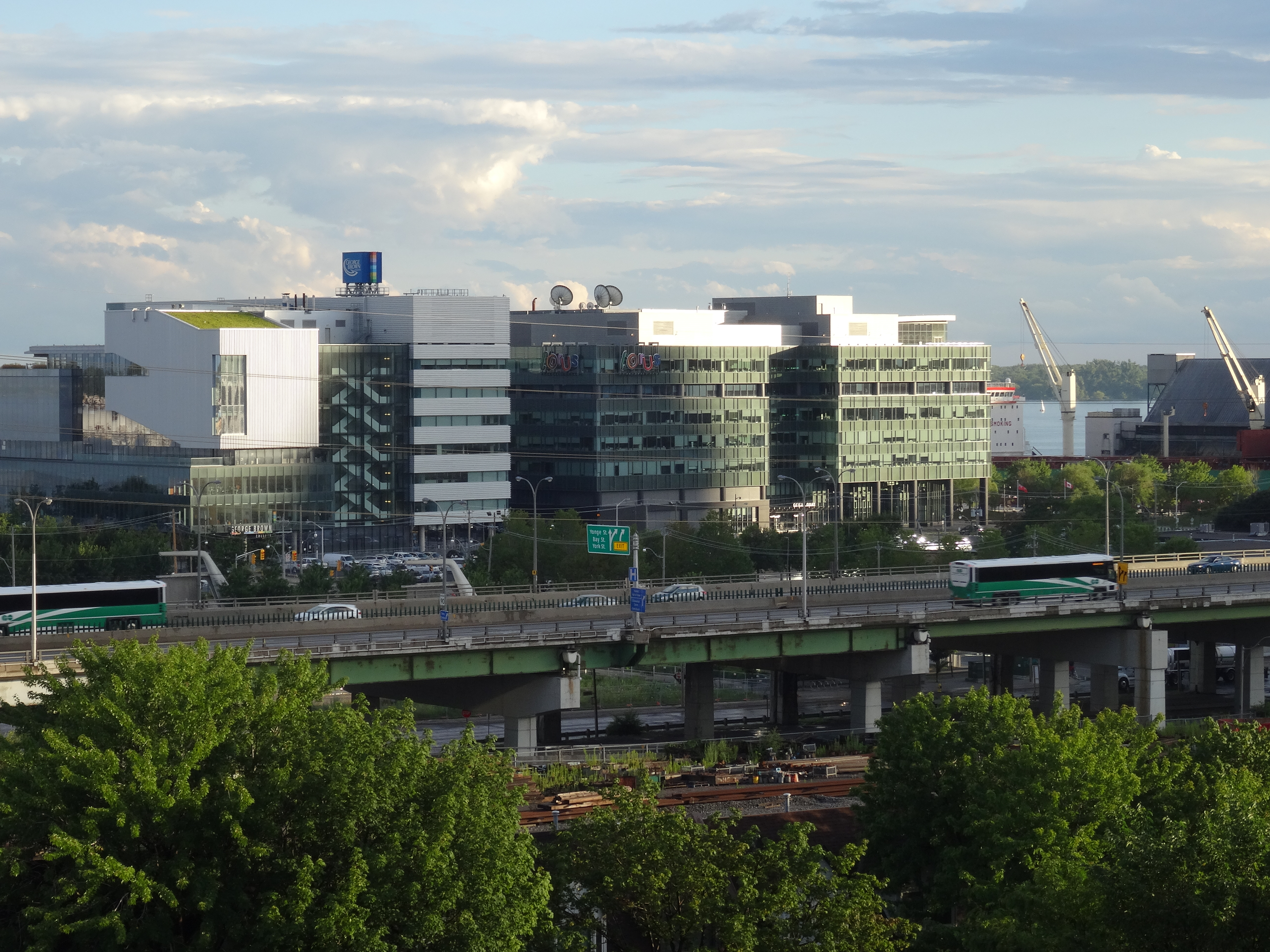
- East Bayfront south of the Gardiner Expressway

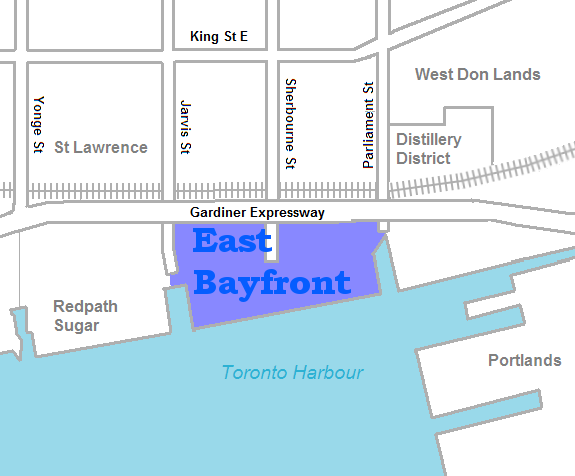
- Country: Canada
- Province: Ontario
- City: Toronto

East Bayfront, or the East Bayfront Precinct, is an emerging neighbourhood in Toronto, Ontario, Canada. It is currently undergoing a transformation from industrial use to mixed-use as part of Waterfront Toronto's plans to create a residential and commercial district urban core near the lake.

The area is bordered by the Parliament Street to the east, Jarvis Street and the Jarvis Slip to the west, and the rail line and Gardiner Expressway to the north.

The area is 15.5 hectares (38 acres) of land. The area was filled in during the 19th and 20th Century to accommodate growth of business needing access to the waterfront.

== History ==
The district is mostly concrete with very few trees or greenspace. The Water's Edge Promenade will provide tree line board walk to the area. Sugar Beach (opened in 2010) and the Sherbourne Common will provide some green space. The area's revitalization is being managed by Waterfront Toronto, a partnership of Federal, Provincial and local governments encouraging progressive and sustainable development of the Toronto waterfront.

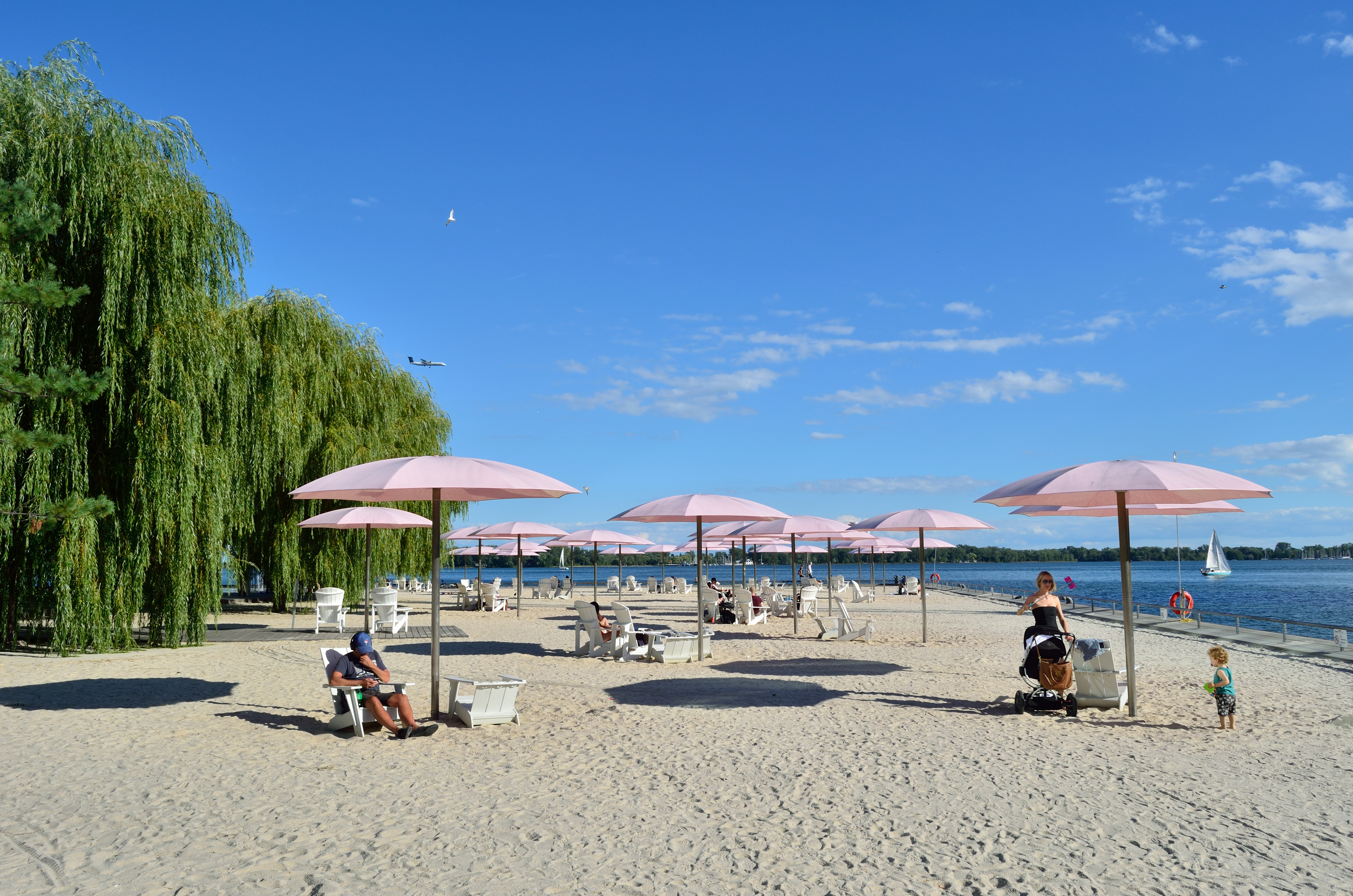
Sugar Beach was opened in 2010 in an effort to increase the amount of green space in East Bayfront.

Several docking facilities for tour boats operating in the inner harbour in the east and west ends of the District. A number of small industrial-commercial business parks dots the area, but some are being demolished and replaced with parking lots. There are four privately owned public parking lots in the district.

The area has gone through redevelopment in the early 21st century, with several new amenities and attractions opening in the neighbourhood including:

- Water's Edge Promenade - a tree lined boardwalk from Jarvis to Sherbourne
- Parkside - Great Gulf Group 36 floor condo project designed by Moshe Safdie
- Bayside - city owned land for planned residential, cultural and retail development
- Parliament Wavedeck - mixed use public space/water treatment facility

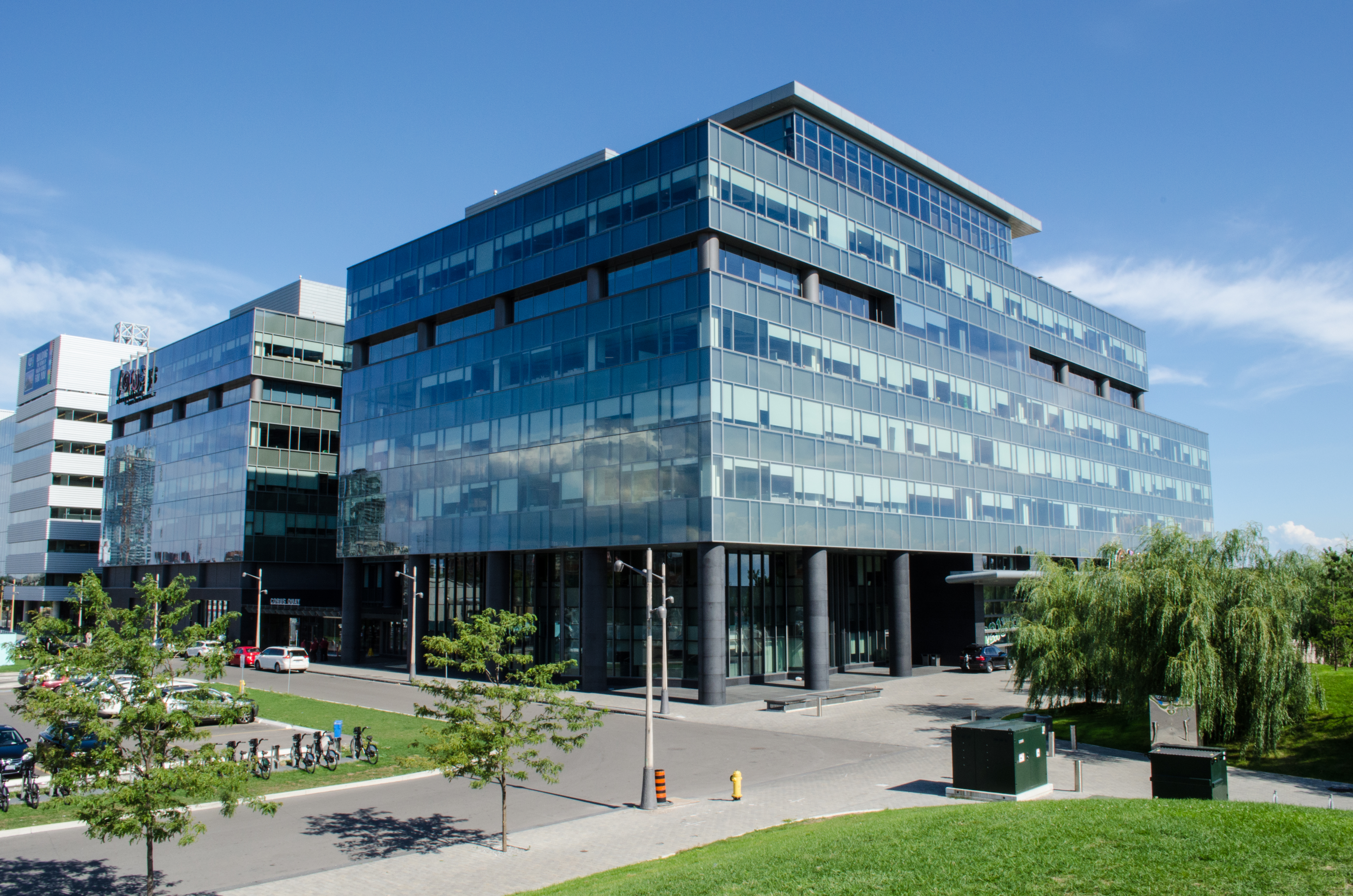
View of Corus Quay and the head offices of Corus Entertainment. George Brown College's Waterfront campus is visible in the background (left).

- Corus Quay
  - Corus Entertainment head offices
  - Sugar Beach
  - Sherbourne Common - a 1.5 hectares (3.7 acres) park
  - George Brown College Waterfront campus

The area includes a 130,000-square-metre (1,400,000 sq ft) office and institutional zone on the dockside tract of East Bayfront. This section consists of the 42,000-square-metre (450,000 sq ft) Corus Quay and the George Brown College's Health Sciences Campus.

In December 2009, Waterfront Toronto revealed the first major private sector development for the district, called Parkside. The $200 million residential development project, designed by Moshe Safdie and developed by Great Gulf Group of Companies, will be located on the northeast corner of Queens Quay East and Sherbourne, south of the Gardiner Expressway and just east of the new Sherbourne Park.

In February 2020, the Université de l'Ontario français announced plans to open its campus in East Bayfront at 9 Lower Jarvis Street. The campus was opened to the public in June 2021.

== Transportation ==
The Bayfront area is accessed by various roads and expressways:

- Queens Quay East - provides access through the centre of the precinct
- Lake Shore Boulevard East - provides access along the northern end of the district
- Gardiner Expressway - forms northern boundary along with Lake Shore Boulevard East with on/off ramps at Jarvis and Sherbourne
- Lower Jarvis Street - forms western boundary; one of the few north-south routes connecting the area to the neighbourhoods north of the Gardiner
- Parliament Street - one of the few north-south routes connecting the area to the neighbourhoods north of the Gardiner
- Lower Sherbourne Street - one of the few north-south routes connecting the area to the neighbourhoods north of the Gardiner

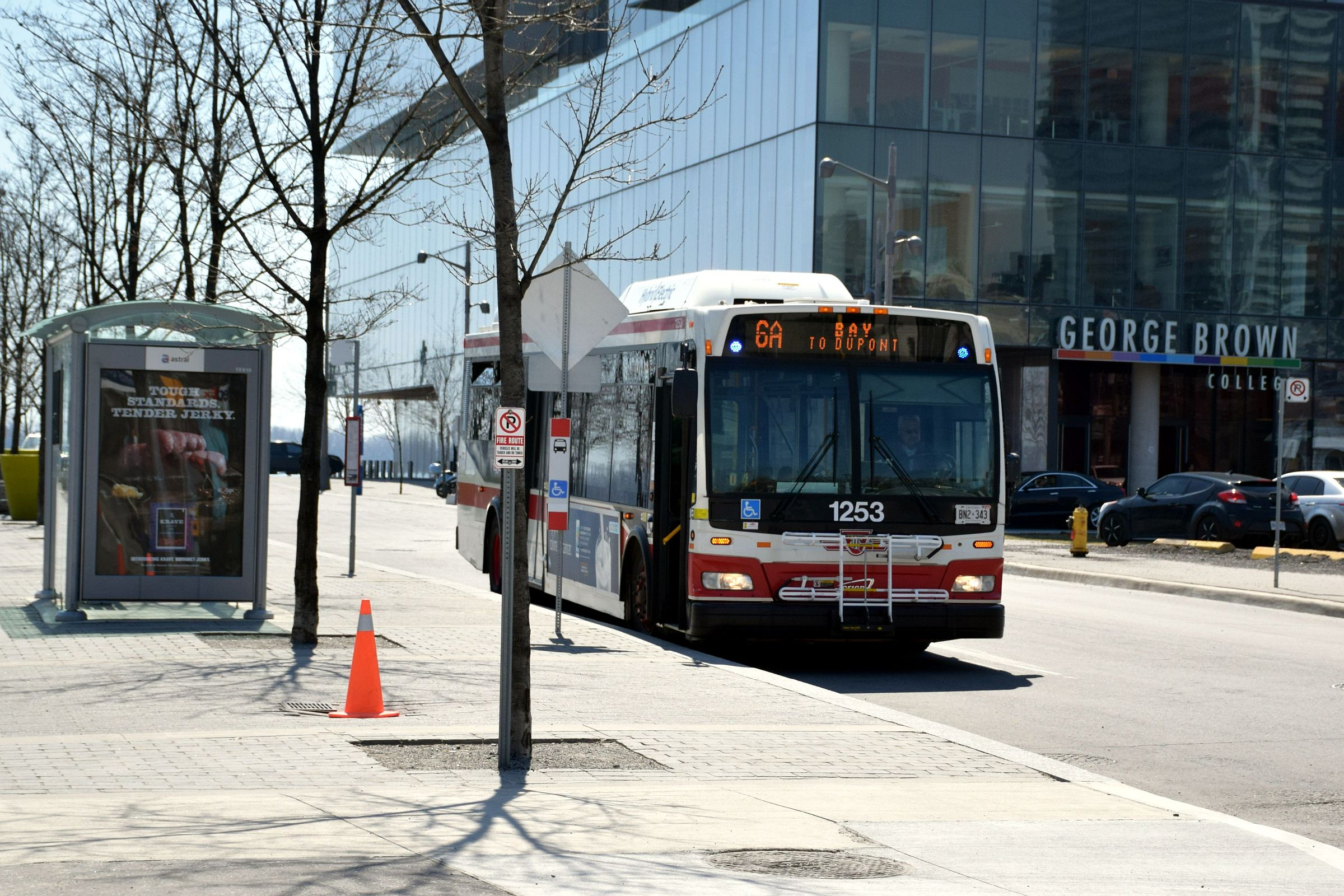
The Toronto Transit Commission operate several bus lines in East Bayfront.

There are a number of local routes in the area cut off by either Lake Ontario or the Gardiner:

- Freeland Street - named for Rand Freeland, owner of Fantasy Farm
- Cooper Street - likely for mill operator William Cooper
- Richardson Street - named for Hugh Richardson, Toronto's first harbour master
- Shaw Street - named for former Mayor John Shaw
- Bonnycastle Street - named for Richard H. G. Bonnycastle, founder of Harlequin Enterprises (now owned by nearby Toronto Star)

Most of these local routes exists to service local businesses and customers.

Plans by the TTC would see streetcar service in the district. Streetcars would run from Union Station down to Bay and Queens Quay, head east along the Queens Quay (southside) to Parliament Street. The interim terminus at Parliament will feature a loop, but the TTC plans to extend the route into the East Donlands in the future.

The Toronto Transit Commission has two bus routes in the precinct's west end:

- 6 and 6A Bay - running along Queens Quay East, Freeland Street and Lower Jarvis
- 75 Sherbourne - running along Lower Sherbourne, Lower Jarvis and Queens Quay East

There is no public transit in the east end of the precinct. There are plans to develop a light rail line along Queens Quay, initially as far as Parliament Street.

=== Slips and quays ===
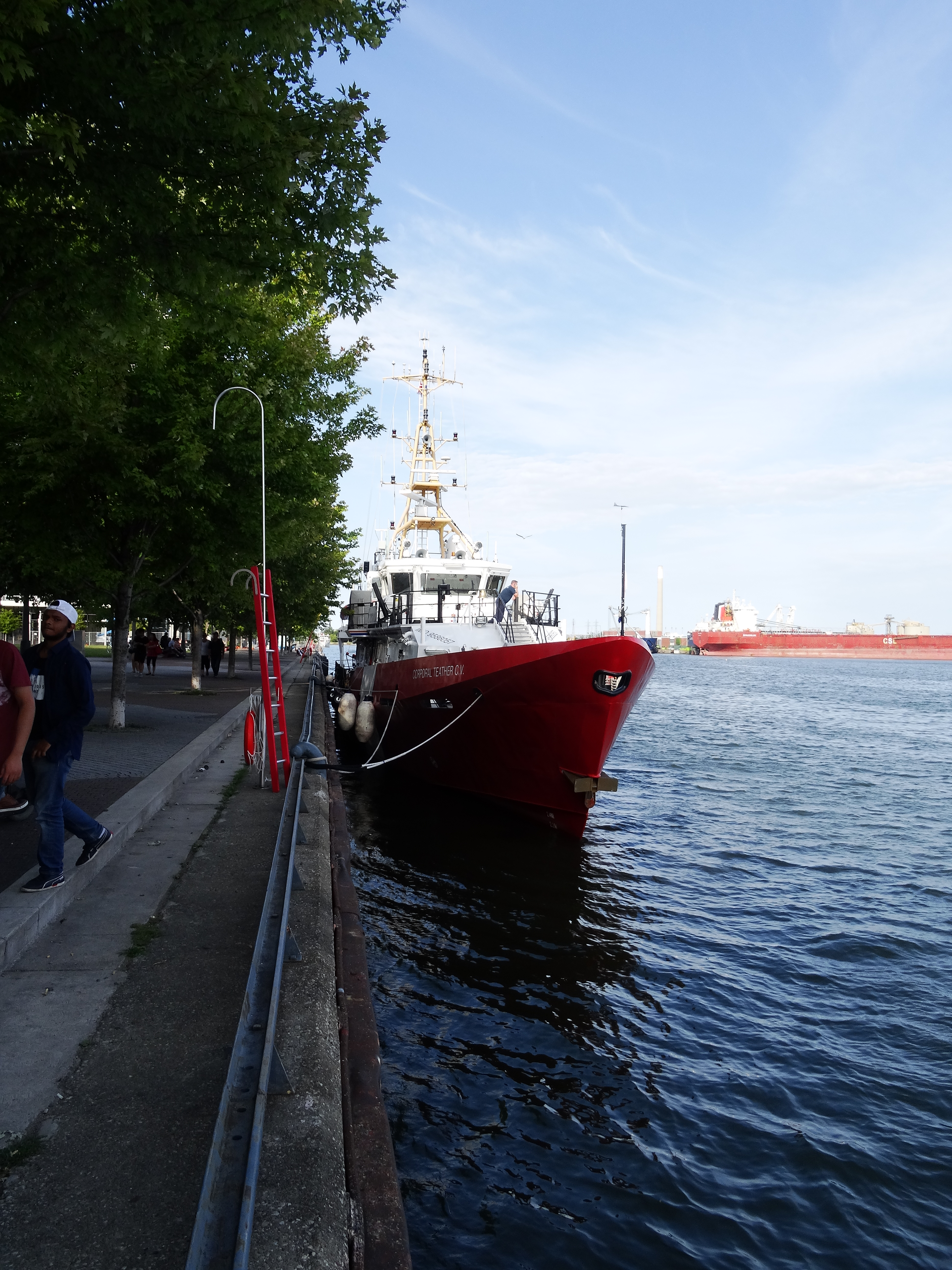
CCGS Corporal Teather C.V. moored at Sherbourne Common.

- Jarvis Street Slip
- Parliament Street Slip
- Pier 27

== See also ==
- Port Lands
- Corktown
- Regent Park
- St. Lawrence Market
- Waterfront Trail
