= Harbourfront, Toronto =

Harbourfront
- Neighbourhood
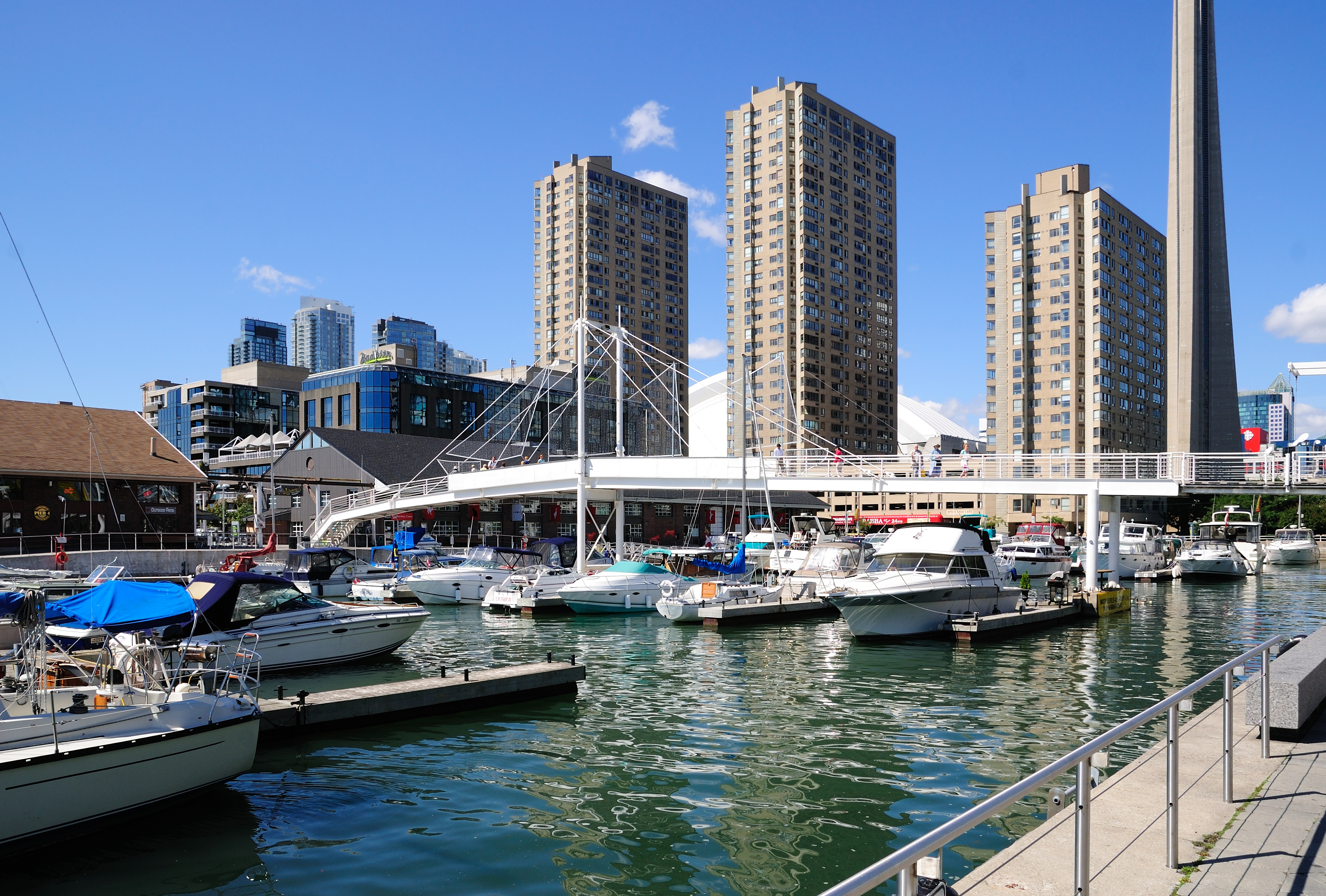
- Harbourfront consists of the northern shoreline of downtown Toronto

- Location within Southern Ontario Location within Ontario Location within Canada
- Coordinates: 43°38′17″N 79°23′06″W
- Country: Canada
- Province: Ontario
- City: Toronto

Government
  - MP: Chi Nguyen (Liberal)
  - MPP: Chris Glover (Ontario NDP)
  - Councillor: Ausma Malik (Ward 10 Spadina—Fort York)

Harbourfront is a neighbourhood on the northwestern shore of Lake Ontario in downtown Toronto, Ontario, Canada. Part of the Toronto waterfront, Harbourfront extends from Bathurst Street in the west, along Queens Quay, with its ill-defined eastern boundary being either Yonge Street or York Street. Its northern boundary is the Gardiner Expressway. Much of the district was former water lots filled in during the early 1900s to create a larger harbour district. After shipping patterns changed and frequent use of Toronto Harbour declined, the area was converted from industrial to a mixed-use district that is now predominately residential and leisure.

== History ==
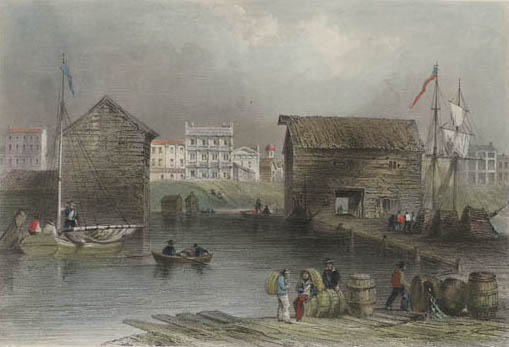
View of the Harbourfront in 1841. The area surrounding the Toronto Harbour has been used for shipping and industrial purposes since the settlement of York.

Toronto's harbour has been used since the founding of Toronto for shipping and industrial purposes. The Town of York was founded to the west of the Don River, along the waterfront. When the town was founded, the water's edge was approximately where today's Front Street is located. Over time, the area south of Front Street to today's water's edge south of Queen's Quay was filled in with landfill, creating piers and area for industrial development.

Prior to the 1972 federal election, Prime Minister Pierre Trudeau announced the Harbourfront project, which would expropriate the industrial port lands from York Street west to Bathurst Street, south of Queen's Quay and convert them to a cultural and residential district for Toronto, similar to the Granville Island district in Vancouver. The federal government has converted the industrial area to an area mixed with art galleries, performance spaces, boating areas and parks. The surrounding neighbourhood, formerly industrial has been converted by private land developers into a series of condominium towers overlooking the project and Lake Ontario.

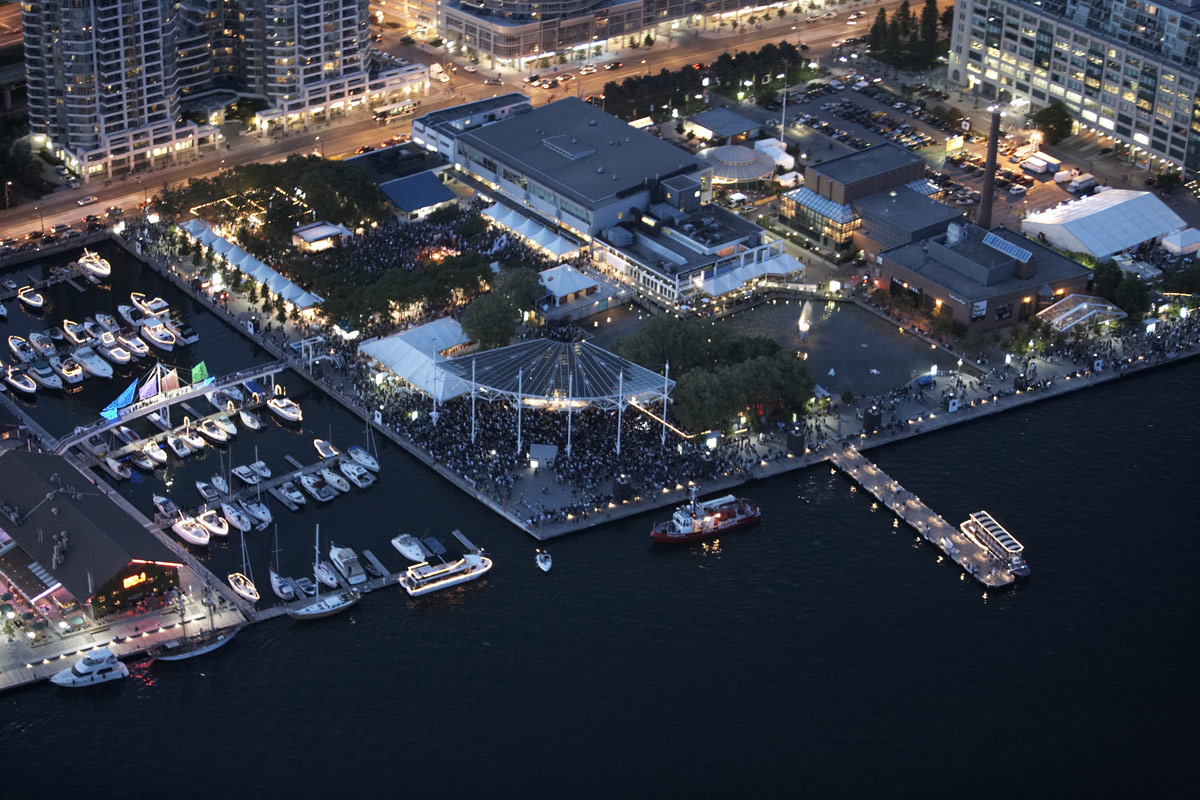
Harbourfront Centre was formed in 1991 in an effort to create a waterfront park in Toronto.

From its beginnings as Harbourfront Corporation, a federal Crown Corporation established in 1972, Harbourfront Centre was formed on January 1, 1991, as a non-profit charitable organization with a mandate to organize and present public events and to operate a 4.0 ha (10 acres) site encompassing York Quay and John Quay (south of Queens Quay West). Since its inception, Harbourfront Centre has been used by artists whose work would not normally be seen in commercial venues in an effort to foster new forms of arts and expression.

In July 2012, Waterfront Toronto began a major reconstruction of Queen's Quay West, requiring the 509 streetcar to be replaced with buses for the duration of the construction. On October 12, 2014, streetcar service resumed on 509 Harbourfront route after an absence of over two years in order to rebuild the street to a new design. With the new street design, two auto lanes south of the Toronto Transit Commission's (TTC) streetcar tracks were eliminated between Spadina Avenue and York Street in order to extend Harbourfront parkland to the edge of the streetcar tracks. The Martin Goodman Trail (a bicycle path), two rows of trees, benches and a wider pedestrian space are located on the immediate south side of the streetcar tracks.

== Character ==
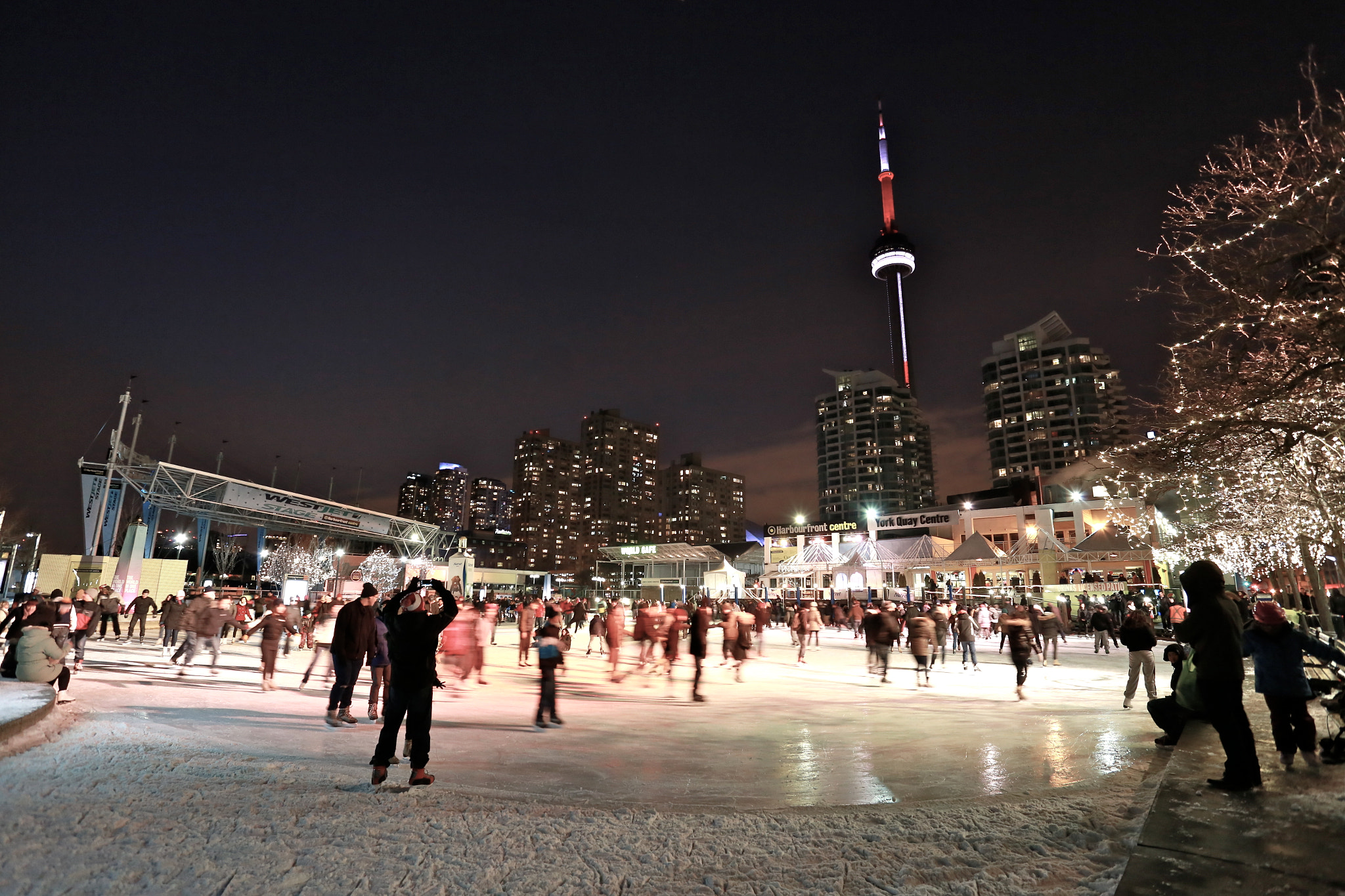
Skating outside Harbourfront Centre. The centre is a cultural organization established by the federal government, at Harbourfront.

The area along the waterfront is composed of mixed uses. The federal government lands to the south of Queen's Quay include a community centre, a Toronto Fire Services station, various boating uses, parkland and the Harbourfront Centre. To the north of Queen's Quay, all of the industrial lands along the street have been replaced with high-rise condominium towers. To the east of the federal government lands, the waterfront is mixed with industrial uses, a hotel, ferry docks, boating uses, a sugar factory and vacant lands.

=== Neighbourhood issues ===
The neighbourhood is separated from the rest of downtown Toronto by the elevated Gardiner Expressway. A project to link Lower Simcoe with Simcoe Street via tunnel was completed to provide a new link between Harbourfront and downtown, though access between the waterfront and the core remains an issue. Proposals have been made to demolish the expressway in the area. One proposal was to demolish the highway east of Spadina Avenue. Another proposal, to demolish the highway from the Don River to Jarvis Street, is being actively studied by the City of Toronto.

Billy Bishop Toronto City Airport, also known as Toronto Island Airport, presents other neighbourhood issues. The airport, located to the southwest of the neighbourhood, is opposed by local community groups and some city politicians, including Toronto's past mayor, David Miller, as an impediment to the redevelopment of the waterfront lands. Another former mayor of Toronto, Rob Ford, backed an expansion of the airport, as it created jobs. The airport, built in the 1930s, is utilized for regional air travel. The airport generates hundreds of noise complaints monthly to its operator, the Toronto Port Authority, now PortsToronto. The Toronto Port Authority confirmed on September 12, 2008, that Porter Airlines was fined for breaking noise curfews in its operations at the airport. In 2008, a study by the Port Authority was conducted seeking ways to reduce noise from Porter's takeoffs and landings.

== Notable buildings and facilities ==
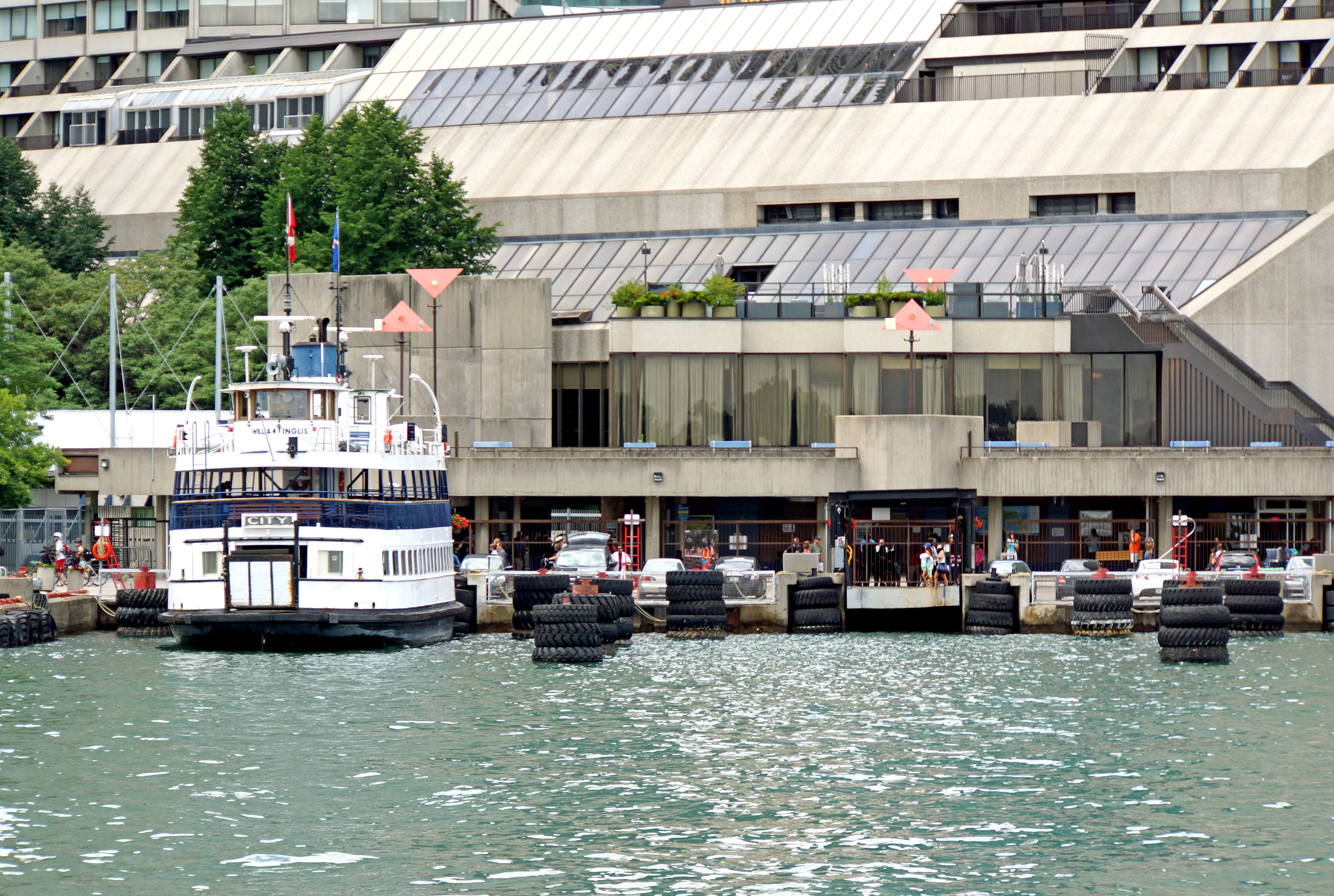
Jack Layton Ferry Terminal is located at the shoreline of Harbourfront.

Harbourfront is the site of the Jack Layton Ferry Terminal which provides transportation services to the Toronto Islands from the foot of Bay Street.

Captain John's Harbour Boat Restaurant was also a ship moored at the Yonge Street slip and removed in 2015. Toronto Maritime Museum was relocated from Exhibition Place in 1997, but closed in 2003.

Harbourfront Centre, housing galleries and performance spaces is located at the foot of Lower Simcoe Street. Harbourfront houses four craft studios; ceramics, glass, metal and textiles. All studios began in 1974 and still operate, providing new craft artists with subsidized work spaces at the beginning of their careers. Harbourfront hosts an extensive program of arts and cultural events throughout each summer, including craft and artisan fairs, theatre and dance performances and musical concerts. A series of free concerts is staged at Harbourfront's outdoor concert stage every weekend throughout the summer and in winter there is a free open-air ice rink.

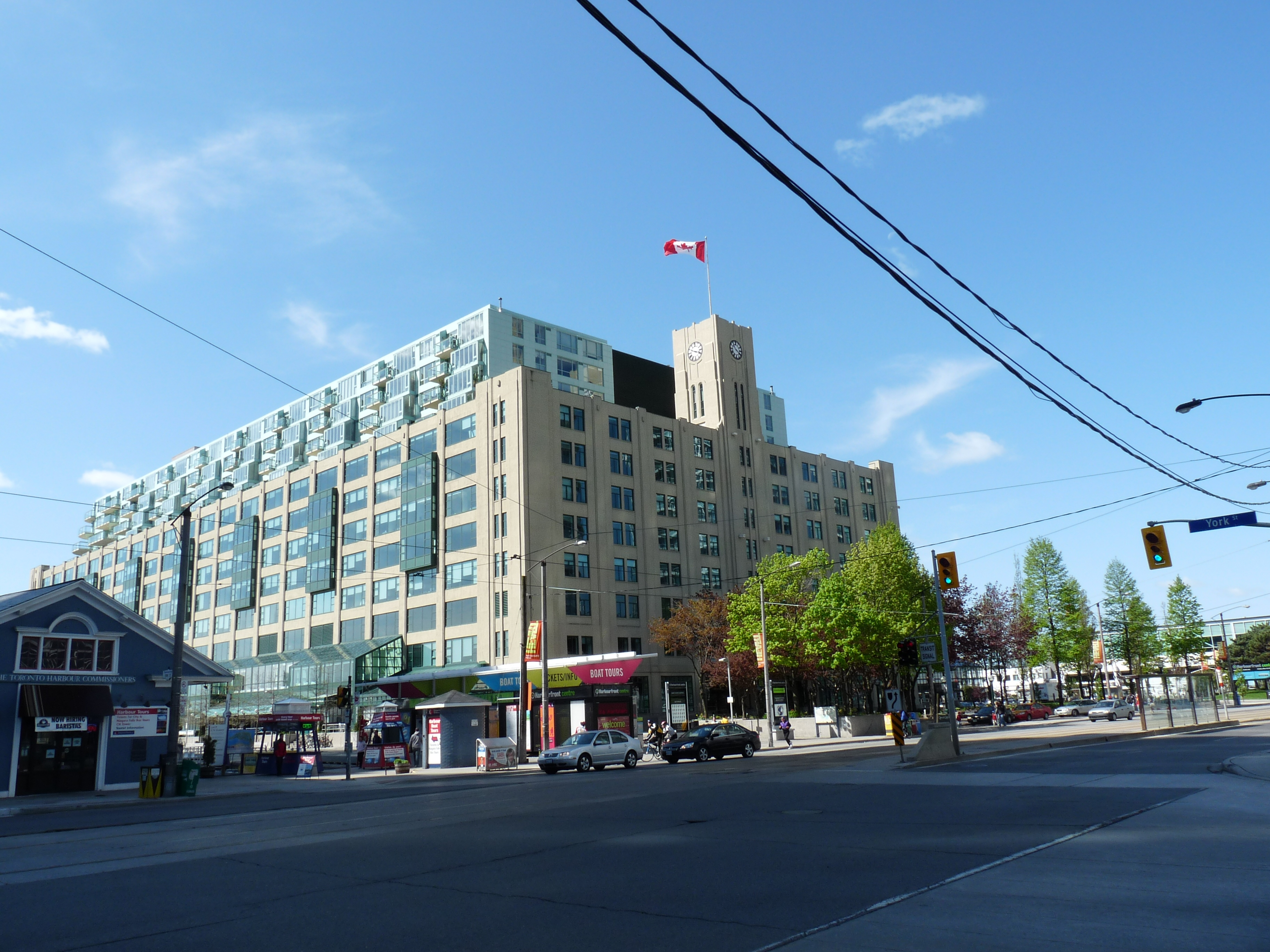
Queen's Quay Terminal is a former warehouse that was converted into a mixed-used building.

Queen's Quay Terminal, next to Harbourfront Centre, is a former warehouse converted into a mixed-use building including a shopping centre designed for high-end retailers, commercial office space, and a residential condominium development. Today, the mall houses some stores and restaurants, predominantly catering to tourists.

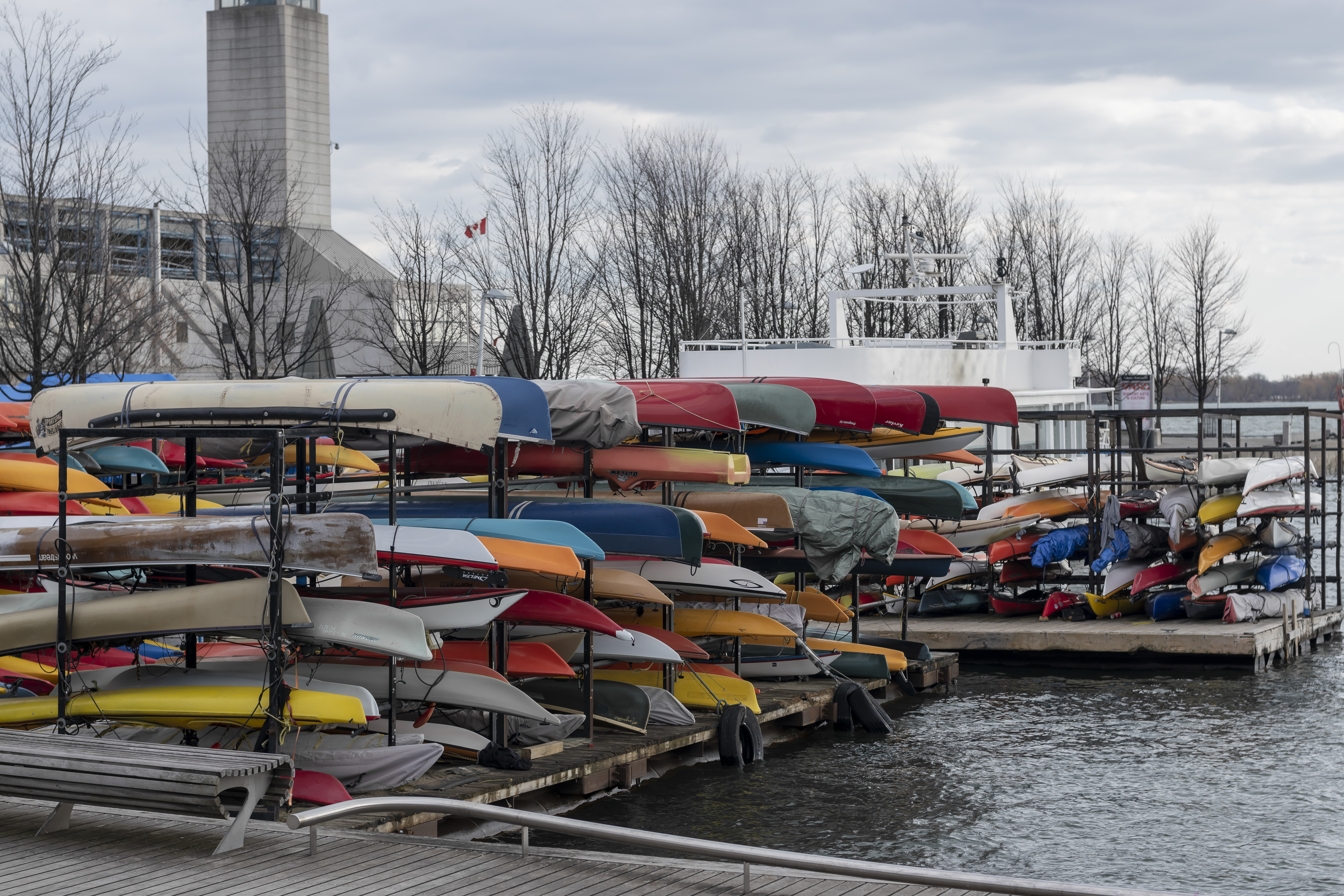
Harbourfront Canoe and Kayak Centre

The Canada Malting Silos along the waterfront at the western edge of Harbourfront, are one of the last vestiges of the industrial past of the neighbourhood. The buildings were long ago abandoned by the company that built them, but a proposal for demolition was cancelled when the estimated cost for demolition rose into the millions of dollars. The site is also now considered a heritage site, and any development must conserve some aspect of the industrial past. Two proposals have been made, a Canadian music museum and a Toronto history museum have both been proposed for the site. Both proposals keep the silos, but demolish other buildings on the site. The silos are one two remaining silos in the area (see Victory Soya Mills Silos) and reminder of the past uses of the area.

To the south of the silos, Toronto's Ireland Park was inaugurated in 2004. The site commemorates the men and women who were forced to flee Ireland during the Great Famine.

To the east of Harbourfront, at the foot of Jarvis Street, is the Redpath Sugar Refinery, which is both an active sugar refinery and a sugar production museum.

== Parks and open spaces ==
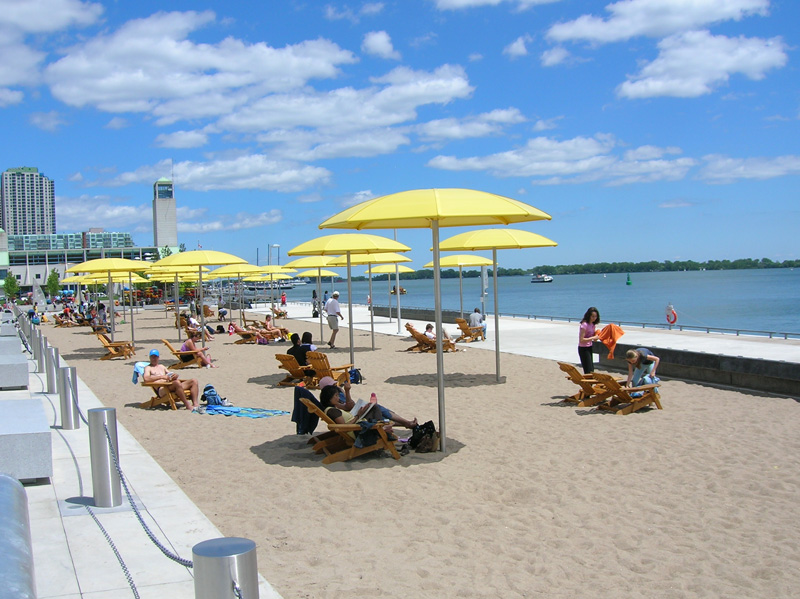
HTO Park is one of several parks located along Harbourfront.

Although Toronto has often been critiqued for its waterfront being unremarkable, Harbourfront has a network of parks, open spaces and trails that allow residents and visitors to access the public realm. Parks and public spaces like HTO Park, the Martin Goodman Trail, the Yo-Yo Ma Music Garden, and the Toronto Waterfront WaveDecks at the foot of Spadina Avenue, Rees Street and Lower Simcoe combine to beautify the area and bring people to the water's edge.

=== List of parks and open spaces ===
- Harbourfront – Water's Edge
- HTO Park
- Ireland Park
- John Quay
- John Quay North
- Harbour Square Park
- Martin Goodman Trail / Waterfront Trail
- Maple Leaf Quay East – former site of Maple Leaf Mills Silos
- Maple Leaf Quay West
- Rees WaveDeck
- Simcoe WaveDeck
- Toronto Music Garden
- Spadina WaveDeck
- York Quay & Harbourfront Centre

== Transportation ==
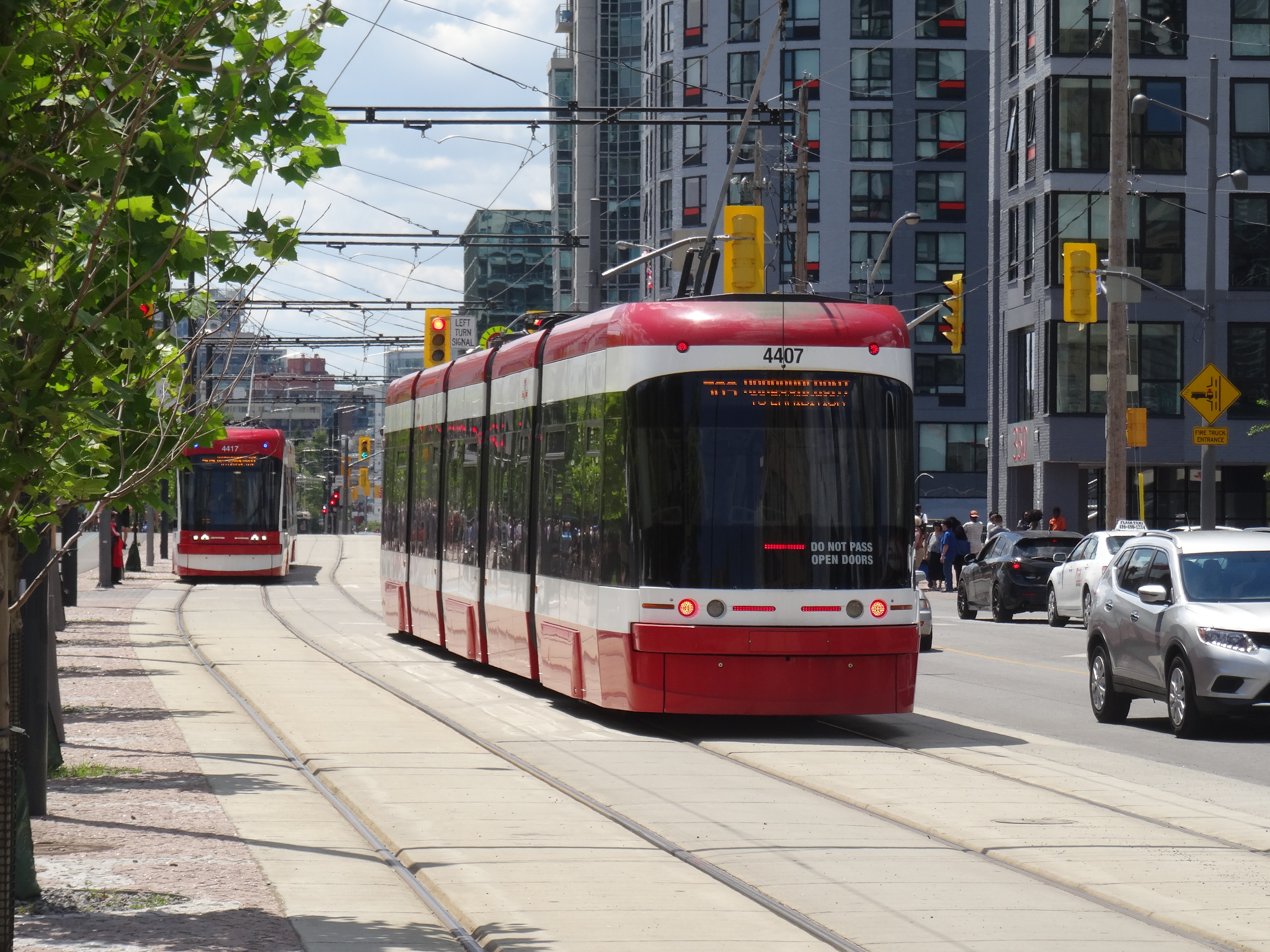
The area is served by the Toronto streetcar system.

The area is served by the Toronto streetcar system, with links to subway stations at Union, Spadina, and Bathurst. The 510 Spadina and 509 Harbourfront streetcar routes terminate at Union Station, travel underground along Bay Street, and surface through in the centre right-of-way lane on Queens Quay west. The streetcar route travels along Queen's Quay in a separate right-of-way, either to the Canadian National Exhibition (CNE) grounds, up to Spadina or to Bathurst, depending on day of the week and other factors.

The area is accessible from the Spadina Avenue, Yonge/Bay and Jarvis street off-ramps of the Gardiner Expressway.

The Toronto Island ferries operate from the City / Bay Street Docks at the foot of Bay Street (all ferries excluding Trillium) and the Yonge Street slip (Trillium).

== Climate ==
Weather records are from Toronto Island Airport (Billy Bishop Toronto City Airport).

Climate data for Toronto (Toronto Island Airport, Harbourfront) WMO ID: 71265; Climate ID: 6158665; coordinates 43°47′43″N 79°23′42″W; elevation: 76.5 m (251 ft) (Note: Includes Toronto City Centre; WMO ID: 71265; Climate ID: 6158667; coordinates 43°47′43″N 79°23′42″W; elevation: 76.8 m (252 ft) and Toronto City Centre; WMO ID: 71265; Climate ID: 6158359; coordinates 43°47′39″N 79°23′46″W; elevation: 76.8 m (252 ft)); 1991–2020 normals (Note: Humidex, temperatures, wind chill and humidity) and 1981–2010 normals (Note: Precipitation and precipitation days), extremes 1905–present
Month	Jan	Feb	Mar	Apr	May	Jun	Jul	Aug	Sep	Oct	Nov	Dec	Year
Record high humidex	13.2	17.5	22.3	31.8	38.8	45.5	48.6	45.3	43.0	38.3	23.3	15.8	48.6
Record high °C (°F)	14.1 (57.4)	18.5 (65.3)	22.5 (72.5)	30.1 (86.2)	34.1 (93.4)	37.2 (99.0)	37.0 (98.6)	36.1 (97.0)	33.4 (92.1)	30.8 (87.4)	20.4 (68.7)	17.3 (63.1)	37.2 (99.0)
Mean daily maximum °C (°F)	−0.5 (31.1)	0.3 (32.5)	4.2 (39.6)	10.2 (50.4)	16.8 (62.2)	22.3 (72.1)	25.3 (77.5)	24.8 (76.6)	20.9 (69.6)	13.8 (56.8)	7.5 (45.5)	2.5 (36.5)	12.4 (54.3)
Daily mean °C (°F)	−3.8 (25.2)	−3.1 (26.4)	0.8 (33.4)	6.5 (43.7)	12.6 (54.7)	18.1 (64.6)	21.0 (69.8)	21.0 (69.8)	17.2 (63.0)	10.5 (50.9)	4.6 (40.3)	−0.3 (31.5)	8.8 (47.8)
Mean daily minimum °C (°F)	−7.1 (19.2)	−6.4 (20.5)	−2.5 (27.5)	2.7 (36.9)	8.3 (46.9)	13.9 (57.0)	16.7 (62.1)	17.2 (63.0)	13.4 (56.1)	7.0 (44.6)	1.7 (35.1)	−3.1 (26.4)	5.1 (41.2)
Record low °C (°F)	−30.0 (−22.0)	−29.4 (−20.9)	−23.1 (−9.6)	−13.3 (8.1)	−3.3 (26.1)	2.2 (36.0)	4.4 (39.9)	5.0 (41.0)	1.7 (35.1)	−5.0 (23.0)	−13.9 (7.0)	−27.2 (−17.0)	−30.0 (−22.0)
Record low wind chill	−36.8	−39.6	−34.0	−17.0	−6.7	0.0	0.0	0.0	0.0	−5.0	−21.2	−34.4	−39.6
Average precipitation mm (inches)	45.3 (1.78)	48.6 (1.91)	54.8 (2.16)	63.9 (2.52)	75.0 (2.95)	62.7 (2.47)	65.0 (2.56)	84.8 (3.34)	86.3 (3.40)	67.1 (2.64)	83.4 (3.28)	60.4 (2.38)	797.3 (31.39)
Average rainfall mm (inches)	19.5 (0.77)	23.0 (0.91)	39.6 (1.56)	61.5 (2.42)	75.0 (2.95)	62.7 (2.47)	65.0 (2.56)	84.8 (3.34)	86.3 (3.40)	67.1 (2.64)	78.5 (3.09)	41.1 (1.62)	704.0 (27.72)
Average snowfall cm (inches)	28.1 (11.1)	26.3 (10.4)	15.5 (6.1)	2.7 (1.1)	0.0 (0.0)	0.0 (0.0)	0.0 (0.0)	0.0 (0.0)	0.0 (0.0)	0.03 (0.01)	4.8 (1.9)	19.7 (7.8)	97.1 (38.2)
Average precipitation days (≥ 0.2 mm)	13.9	11.6	11.7	12.7	12.3	10.7	10.3	10.9	11.4	12.3	13.4	13.0	144.2
Average rainy days (≥ 0.2 mm)	4.4	5.1	8.4	11.8	12.3	10.7	10.3	10.9	11.4	12.3	12.0	7.4	117.0
Average snowy days (≥ 0.2 cm)	10.5	8.3	5.3	1.6	0.0	0.0	0.0	0.0	0.0	0.07	2.4	7.7	35.6
Average relative humidity (%) (at 1500 LST)	69.5	66.8	63.6	63.4	66.1	67.9	67.2	68.3	67.4	69.5	70.8	70.6	67.6
Source: Environment and Climate Change Canada (June maximum) (January minimum) (Canadian Climate Normals 1981–2010}
