= Sugar Beach =

Urban beach in Toronto, Ontario, Canada

Coordinates: 43.64304°N 79.36741°W

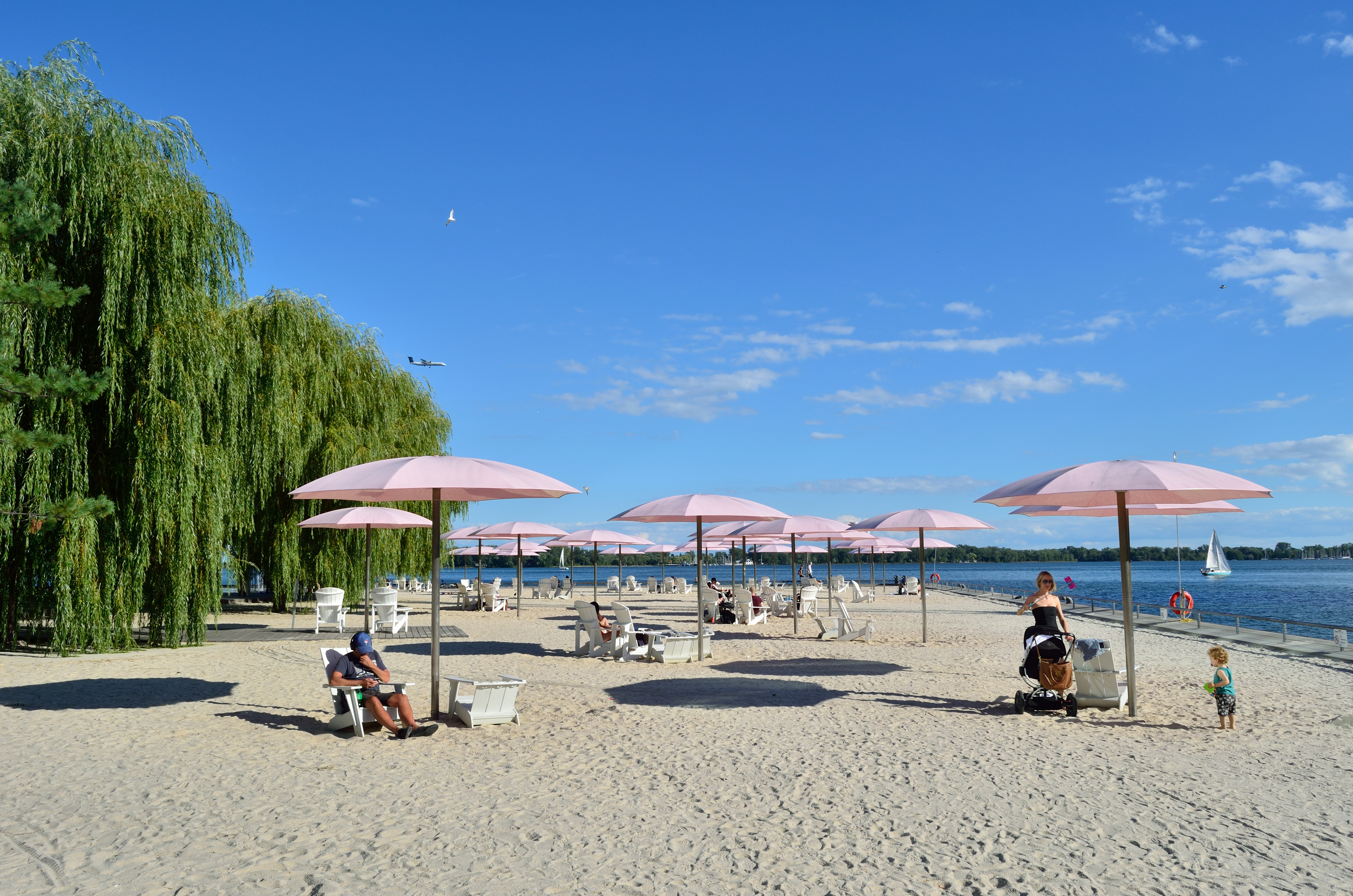
- The beach in 2016
- Interactive map of Sugar Beach
- Type: Urban beach park
- Location: Toronto, Ontario, Canada
- Area: 2 acres (0.81 ha)
- Created: August 9, 2010
- Operator: City of Toronto
- Awards: Azure magazine's AZ People's Choice Award: Best Landscape Architecture (2012); National Urban Design Award, Civic Design Projects (2012); American Society of Landscape Architects' Honor Award (2012): General Design

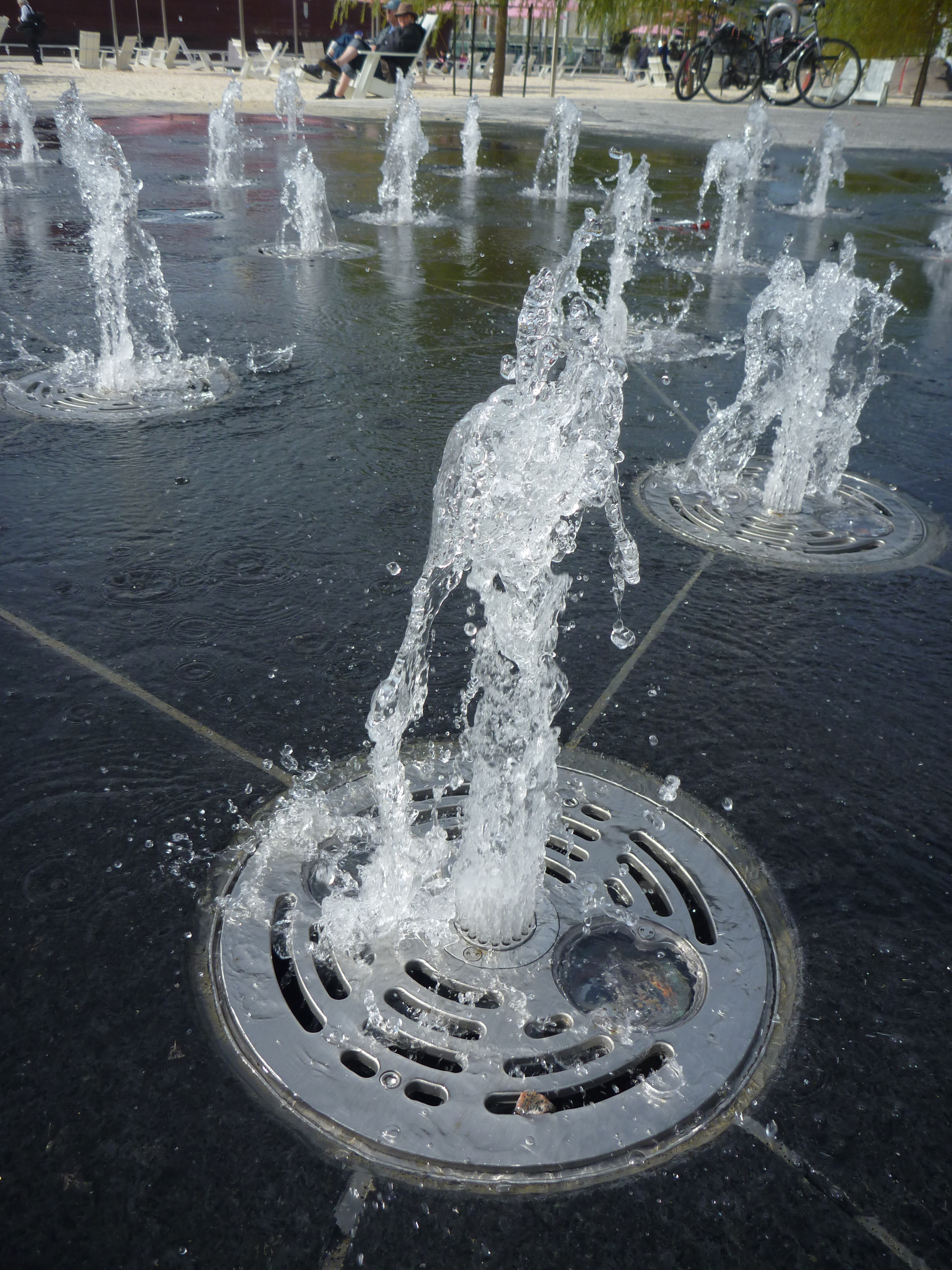
Sugar Beach aquatic play area splash pad

Sugar Beach is an urban beach park in Toronto, Ontario, Canada, that opened in 2010. It is located across from Redpath Sugar Refinery in Toronto's eastern East Bayfront. Like HTO Park to the west, the beach is not meant for wading or swimming in Lake Ontario, but rather functions as a waterfront public space for relaxation, leisure, and social activities. It cost $14 million.

A Waterfront Toronto project, the park is designed by landscape architecture firm Claude Cormier + Associés Inc. It features a sandy beach with ornamental lighting, umbrellas, Muskoka chairs, rocky amphitheatre and candy trim, and pedestrian areas paved with granite setts in three colours arranged in a stylized maple leaf motif.

Since 2011, the beach has been the setting for the Toronto Port Authority's Sail-In Cinema event, with an inflatable movie screen mounted on a custom-built barge approximately 50 metres south of the beach.

== History ==
The park is triangular-shaped and built next to Redpath Sugar's refinery at Lower Jarvis Street and Queens Quay—the park's name references the nearby sugar refinery. It shares space with the new home of Corus Entertainment on Corus Quay (formerly Jarvis Street Slip). The building and beach are separated by a paved area with benches and trees in Silva Cells that provide over 30 cubic meters of uncompacted soil to each tree. Corus Quay has large retractable doors that allow the building to host concerts and events at Sugar Beach. Prior to construction, the entire site was a parking lot for the Jarvis Street Slip and located across from The Guvernment night club. The slip itself dates back to infilling around 1919 to 1920s.

== See also ==
A list of Toronto's other beaches and waterfront parks:

- The Beaches
- Cherry Beach
- Woodbine Beach
- HTO Park
- Sunnyside
