= Global Convenience =

Former floating art installation in Toronto

- Global Convenience in Harbour Square Park Basin, July 2026
- Artists: Trevor Wheatley and Cosmo Dean (TF Dean Studio Inc.)
- Designer: Puncture (Rashad Maharaj and Spencer Cathcart)
- Year: 2026
- Medium: Sculpture
- Subject: A corner convenience store
- Condition: Removed; closed 5 October 2026
- Location: Harbour Square Park Basin, Toronto; 43.6389°N 79.3779°W
- Commissioner: Waterfront Toronto

Global Convenience was a temporary public art installation in Toronto, Ontario, Canada. Created by artists Trevor Wheatley and Cosmo Dean of TF Dean Studio Inc. with the production company Puncture, it imitated a corner convenience store and was built on a floating dock in the Harbour Square Park Basin on Lake Ontario. Waterfront Toronto commissioned it for its Floating Public Art program, and it was timed to coincide with Toronto's role as a host city of the 2026 FIFA World Cup.

The store was installed in the basin on 12 June 2026. It was meant to be seen from the shore, and its shelves were stocked with products from several countries. Solar power kept its signs lit after dark. Its realism drew crowds and attention on social media, and because visitors could not go inside, it was nicknamed the "Inconvenience Store". Some people tried to reach it by water; in June 2026, a man who swam out to the installation became stranded on its dock and had to be rescued. It closed on 5 October 2026, and residents held a mock funeral for it.

== Background ==
Waterfront Toronto began its Floating Public Art program in 2019, commissioning temporary works for the Harbour Square Park Basin, near the Jack Layton Ferry Terminal. Global Convenience was the sixth work installed there and was chosen through an open call for the 2026 program. In 2025, the program installed floating yellow letters that spelled out "it comes in waves". An external selection committee of arts professionals and waterfront stakeholders, which included a local resident and representatives of the Toronto and Region Conservation Authority and the Waterfront Business Improvement Area, chose the winning proposal, and Waterfront Toronto announced the work on 14 May 2026.

Wheatley and Dean are Toronto artists whose work places language and visual signs from city environments into natural settings. Both had made large installations before, often from reused materials, including commissions for the WayHome Music & Arts Festival and Nike. They entered the call together with Puncture, a Toronto production company run by Rashad Maharaj and Spencer Cathcart, which said it thought of the artists as soon as the call was released. The four had met years earlier, when Puncture brought Wheatley and Dean in to make hanging typographic installations for WayHome, and Global Convenience was the first collaboration of its kind among them. The group began work in February 2026, before the contract was awarded.

== Concept ==
According to Azure Magazine, the idea began as Wheatley and Dean's plan for a floating flower shop. Maharaj and Cathcart, whose immigrant families both started convenience stores in Toronto, proposed expanding it. Cathcart noted that opening a shop was often the only economic foothold available to such families. Toronto hosted FIFA World Cup matches from 12 June to 2 July 2026, and the artists said the tournament led them to think of the convenience store as a "cultural crossroads", a small space where products, languages and traditions sit side by side. Maharaj said the team hoped World Cup visitors would find the store familiar. Wheatley told Now Toronto that a corner store let them speak to the city's international character without resorting to a monumental civic emblem. In a Waterfront Toronto release, the artists described the work as moving an entire urban type, the convenience store, into an unexpected setting. They also saw the harbour, long associated with trade and the arrival of goods and people, as a fitting setting. Waterfront Toronto's announcement listed arrival, migration and daily ritual among the work's themes.

== Design and construction ==
The work imitated a small brick-fronted store, with a neon open sign, flowers and produce displayed outside, and a yellow fire hydrant. The back was spray-painted with a no parking message. The store sat on a floating dock secured by six 3,000-pound (1,400 kg) anchors. The doors did not open, and the goods inside were not for the taking. According to Waterfront Toronto, the building read as a store from every side but was deliberately placed beyond visitors' reach. Shelves inside held snacks, household goods and other items, including candy, car air fresheners and toothbrushes. Small flags from various countries were also displayed on the walls. The products were real and were sourced from around the world; the Toronto Star reported a potato chip brand from the Philippines and an instant noodle brand from South Korea, and the New York Times mentioned ketchup-flavoured Lay's chips. The artists looked for goods that shoppers in several countries would know. Items they singled out included shrimp puffs, plantain chips, Coffee Crisp and a stack of vintage newspapers from 1999.

The artists and Puncture drew on convenience store signage from Japan, Brazil, Turkey and the United States, and added subtle patinas to make the store look used. Cathcart said nothing in the design was meant to replicate a particular store. He compared the intended effect to a movie set: viewers should grasp what it was immediately but find small oddities on closer inspection. Puncture handled the signage and graphics. The storefront accumulated barred windows, decals, price signs and illuminated graphics, and the lettering and colours were deliberately cramped and clashing, with printed and hand-painted signs side by side. The mismatches were intended, so that the front would look gradually added to rather than designed in one go. The Global Convenience sign was modelled on familiar store signs and set in a 1970s typeface called Zipper, which Cathcart said is also used by a shop in Parkdale called Best Convenience. Because the store could not be entered, the team also made flyers and posters, including one advertising a key-cutting service, to carry its look onto land.

Weight and buoyancy shaped the construction. The artists made the dock larger and the building slightly shorter than first planned, formed the walls from vacuum-formed plastic, and sculpted the hydrant from foam. The white icebox was made largely from scrap plywood. Dean told Now Toronto that the build had to be strong yet buoyant, and that moving it from the studio to the water and working within a tightening budget added to the difficulty. The finished structure weighed about 7,000 pounds (3,200 kg) less than its capacity. Puncture described engineering as central to the build, covering buoyancy, wind load, lifting points, anchoring and stability, with materials and details revised repeatedly along the way. Azure Magazine reported that the structure and props such as the hydrant were built at the artists' Geary Avenue workshop, largely from wood, foam and vinyl. The finished store was then trucked on a flatbed to the waterfront, lifted by crane into the lake and fixed to submerged anchors. Some elements were added or adjusted after installation because waves and current moved the structure. A solar-powered system kept a large lightbox sign, exterior lights and the interior lit through the night. Wheatley said the team had to learn the basics of solar power to make this work, and that the store's glow on the water at night looked surreal. The work was meant to be viewed from the waterfront promenade along Queens Quay West and from Harbour Square Park.

== Reception ==
The installation attracted crowds along the shore, where people gathered to look at it and take photographs. Now Toronto reported that social media users praised it and joked about it as the city's least convenient convenience store. Azure Magazine noted that design accounts on Instagram, including Designboom and Elle Decor Italia, had covered it. The nickname "Inconvenience Store" followed from the fact that nobody could enter it. CBC Arts described it as a hyperrealistic replica that had gone viral, and the program Commotion interviewed the curator and critic Charlene K. Lau about the work and the unexpected ways people interact with public art. Writing for Complex, Christopher Turner compared it to Prada Marfa, the non-functioning luxury storefront that Elmgreen & Dragset installed in the Texas desert in 2005, since both place ordinary commercial architecture in an unexpected setting. He added that Global Convenience drew on the corner store rather than on luxury retail. Azure Magazine also named Prada Marfa as a precedent, noting that it was broken into soon after its 2005 unveiling, whereas visitors who had reached Global Convenience by water had not tried to force their way inside.

=== Public interaction ===
CBC Arts reported that the installation was realistic enough that pedestrians had swum and paddled out to it, although swimming in Toronto Harbour outside designated areas is illegal. Now Toronto reported that kayakers, canoeists and boaters also made their way out. Wheatley said the piece looks like a sculpture from shore, but that people who reached it by water wanted a closer inspection. He tied this to a tension in the design, since a convenience store is normally about as easy to walk into as any building gets, and that reflex persisted even though the work could not function as a shop. In a July newsletter, CBC Arts writer Leah Collins wrote that she saw a boat travel straight to it from Toronto Island. She noted that it could not be entered and that visitors were strongly discouraged from boarding it. Dean said the work was intended to be seen from afar, but acknowledged that it had become shared public property and would develop on its own. Cathcart told Azure Magazine that the team had assumed its status as art would be obvious despite the level of detail, and that he had overheard a visitor asking how to get out to it. Wheatley told The New York Times that someone had swum out and painted graffiti on it despite keep-off signs on the dock, and that he did not mind, describing it as "one more honest interaction".

In June 2026, a man who swam to the store became stranded on its dock. Fire crews reached him by boat and rescued him, and video posted on social media showed him standing on the dock while he waited. Toronto Fire Services said it transferred him to paramedics.

== End of the installation ==
Waterfront Toronto had said the work would stay in place until early October. In September, Now Toronto reported that it would close for the season as summer ended and heavy rain and winter weather approached. It remained in the basin during Nuit Blanche on 3 and 4 October, and closed on 5 October 2026. On 4 October, the Toronto content creator Brandon Wong organized a mock funeral for the store at 25 Queens Quay West. Attendees were invited to wear whatever they liked, and a picnic at sunset followed. Wong, Maharaj and Wheatley discussed the event on CBC's The National on 6 October, and CBC reported the next day that Torontonians had gathered to pay their respects as the installation's run ended.
