= WaveDecks =

Wooden structures in Toronto, Canada

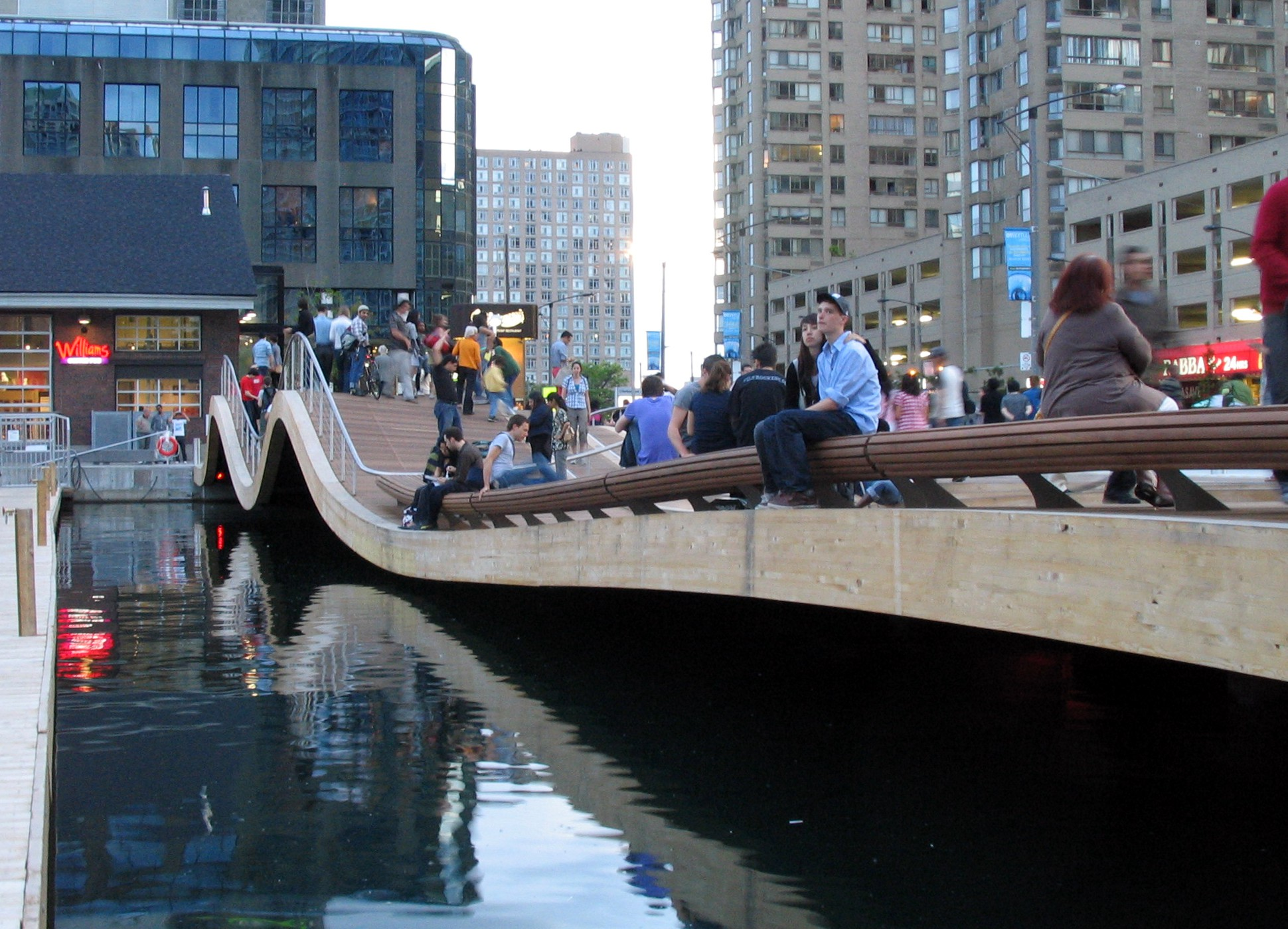
People relaxing on the Simcoe WaveDeck, one of several wooden structures constructed on the Toronto waterfront.

The Toronto Waterfront Wavedecks are a series of wooden structures constructed on the waterfront of Toronto, Ontario, Canada, as part of the revitalization of the central waterfront. Waterfront Toronto committed to constructing a series of unique wooden wavedecks along the water's edge for the 3.5 km area running from Bathurst Street to Parliament Street. All the WaveDecks are accessible from the southside of Queens Quay.

The wavedecks are new public spaces that vary in shape, articulation and design to reflect the movement of Lake Ontario.

Despite each deck having multiple levels separated by steps, they are all wheelchair accessible. The undulations of each level provide for a smooth, stepless path from one end of the deck to the other (going widthwise). These paths are visually marked by yellow metal discs embedded into the decks themselves.

== History ==
In June 2006, West 8 and duToit Allsopp Hillier won the Toronto Central Waterfront Innovative Design Competition for their entry that included the construction of a series wavedecks along Toronto's waterfront. Each wavedeck is unique and designed to resemble to the contours of Lake Ontario's shoreline and reclaim parts of the shoreline along water's edge south of Queens Quay.

A total of three WaveDecks were constructed with one more being planned, each acting as unique gateways to the waterfront. Once the transformation is complete, WaveDecks will be at the foots of Spadina Avenue, and Rees, Simcoe, and Parliament streets. The Spadina WaveDeck opened in late-summer of 2008, followed by the opening of the Simcoe WaveDeck in June 2009 and the Rees WaveDeck in July, 2009.

== Spadina WaveDeck ==
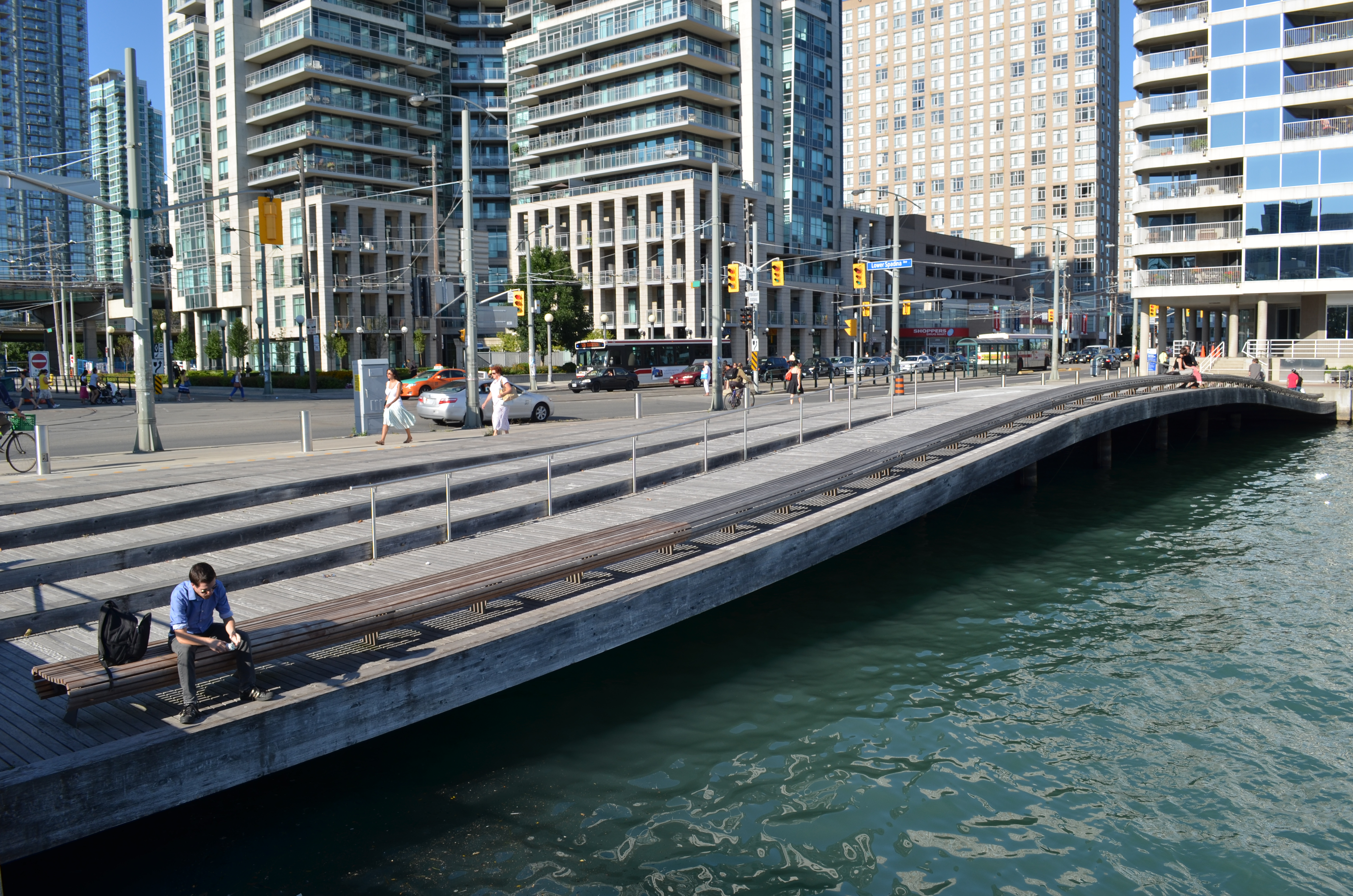
The Spadina WaveDeck won the 2009 Toronto Urban Design Award.

The first WaveDeck was constructed at the Spadina Head of Slip, consisting of a 620-metre squared undulating wood pedestrian deck over water, adjacent to the foot of Spadina Avenue south of Queens Quay Boulevard. Construction started in November 2007 by Somerville contractors and lasted 10 months. The Spadina WaveDeck links two waterfront parks: Music Garden and HTO Park. The WaveDeck cost $4.1 million to build and is made of 3,564 wooden planks. It is the WaveDeck that is the furthest to the west.

The Spadina WaveDeck won the 2009 Toronto Urban Design Award of Excellence in the Small Open Space category.

The WaveDeck is located at the coordinates 43.63753°N 79.39164°W.

== Rees WaveDeck ==
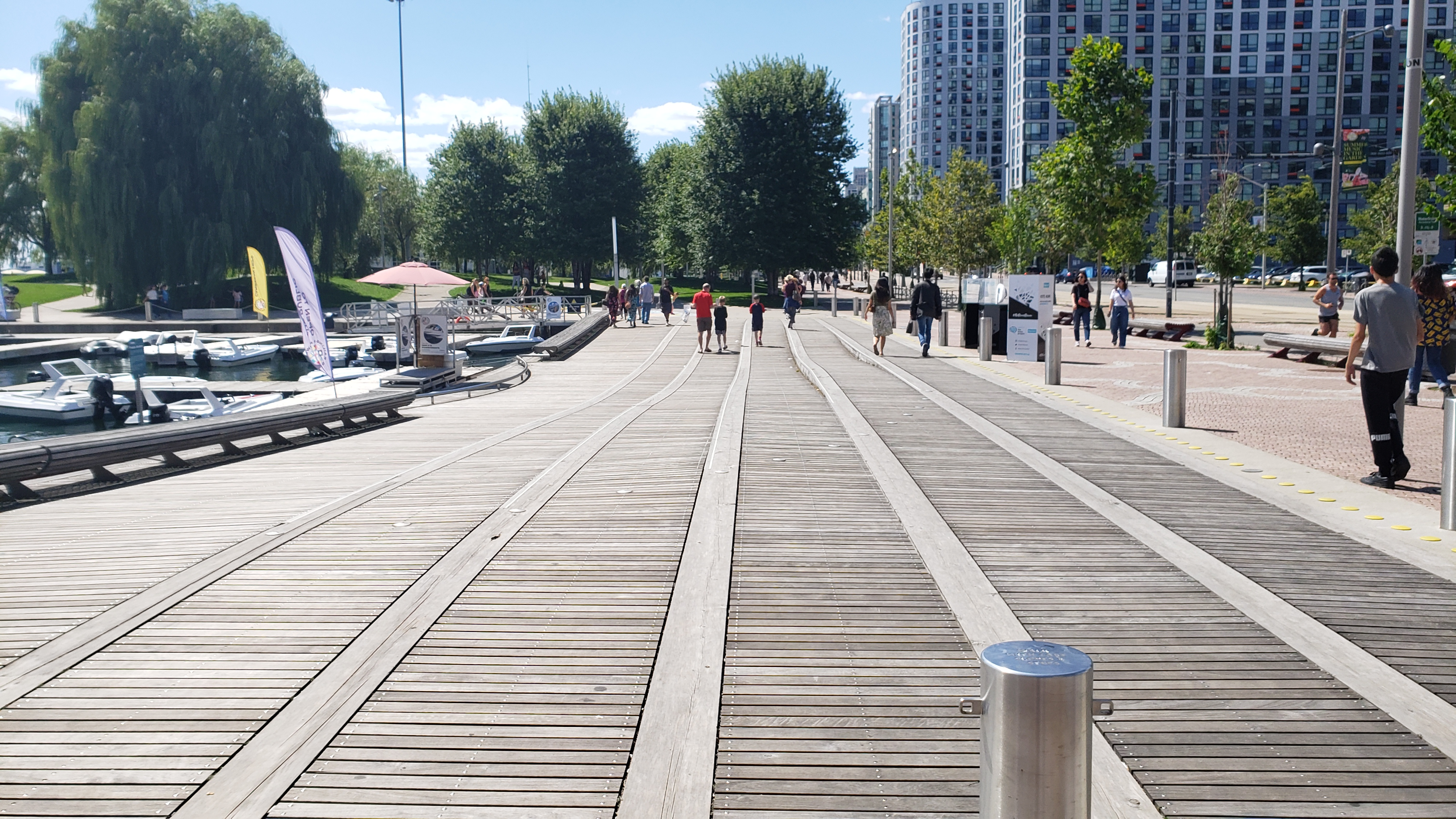
The Rees WaveDeck from the eastside of the WaveDeck

The Rees WaveDeck was opened in July 2009. The levels of the WaveDeck get lower and have a larger decline as they get closer to the lakeshore. This can cause the levels closer to the lakeshore the flood during times the water levels rises such as during heavy rainfall. The Rees WaveDeck is just east of HTO Park and connects it with the more central portions of the Harbourfront.

The WaveDeck is located at the coordinates 43.63849°N 79.38732°W.

== Simcoe WaveDeck ==
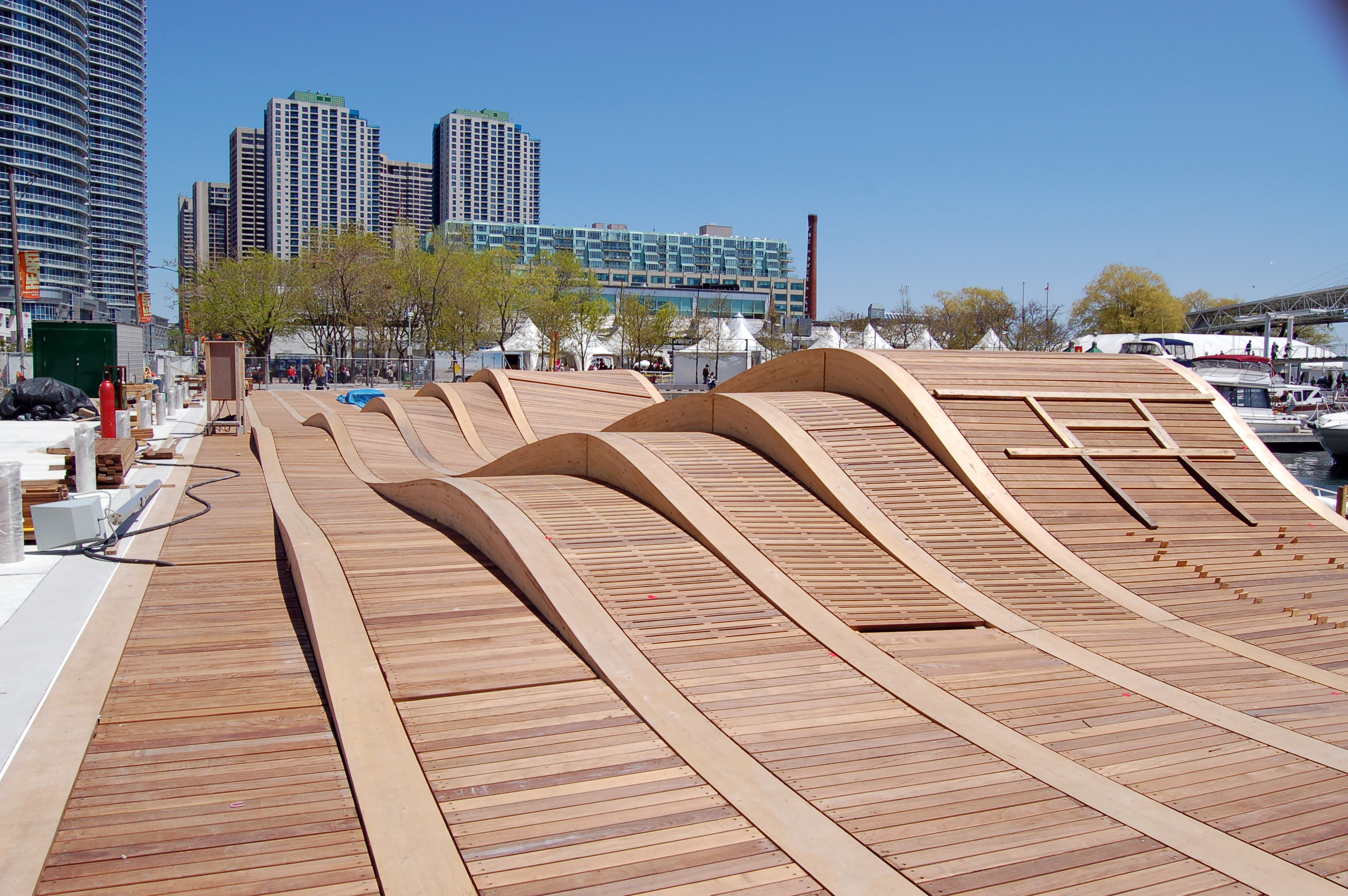
Construction for the Simcoe Wavedeck nearing completion in May 2009

The Simcoe WaveDeck opened in June 2009. The artistic design has a dramatic 2.6 metre high curve as well as metal railings to prevent injuries. It is located just west of Simcoe Street at the water's edge and has quickly become a major attraction along the waterfront. It connects the Harbourfront Centre the westernly portions of the Harbourfront. is currently the WaveDeck that is the furthest to the east.

The WaveDeck is located at the coordinates 43.63898°N 79.38462°W.

== Parliament WaveDeck ==
The Parliament WaveDeck is a proposed fourth WaveDeck that will be located at the intersection of Parliament Street and Queen's Quay. It is expected to be built once the East Bayfront development progresses. Once completed, it will be the WaveDeck that is the furthest to the east.

== See also ==
- Harbourfront
- Toronto waterfront
