= Waterfront Toronto =

Organization that oversees revitalization projects along the Toronto waterfront

- Established: 2001 (as the Toronto Waterfront Revitalization Corporation)
- Headquarters: 20 Bay Street, Suite 1310; Toronto, Ontario, Canada
- Budget: $18.8 million (operating budget; 2018/19)
- Website: waterfrontoronto.ca

Waterfront Toronto (incorporated as the Toronto Waterfront Revitalization Corporation) is an organization that oversees revitalization projects along the Toronto waterfront. Established in 2001 as a public–public partnership between the City of Toronto, Province of Ontario and Government of Canada, the organization is administering several blocks of land redevelopment projects surrounding Toronto Harbour and various other initiatives to promote the revitalization of the area, including public transit, housing developments, brownfield rehabilitation, possible removal of the Gardiner Expressway in the area, the Martin Goodman Trail and lakeshore improvements, and naturalization of the Don River. Actual development of the projects is done by other entities, primarily private corporations. The projects include a series of wavedeck walkways and gathering places designed by West 8 and DTAH.

== Overview ==
The Waterfront Revitalization Task Force, a task force of the municipal, provincial and federal governments, was established in November 1999 to study the future of the Toronto waterfront. The task force, headed by financier Robert Fung, reported in March 2000. It estimated the total cost of revitalization at CA$5 billion in public investment and a further CA$7 billion in private-sector investment.

It proposed the following general recommendations for the Toronto waterfront:

- Make the water's edge an accessible, public amenity from Etobicoke through the Central Waterfront to Scarborough;
- Remove the elevated Gardiner Expressway in the Central Waterfront and provide a new road and transportation network to better serve Toronto's downtown and revitalized waterfront;
- Create in the core of the City major new neighbourhoods for working, living, and recreation, resulting in a substantial increase in the city's stock of affordable and market housing;
- Create a "convergence community" that crosses all disciplines of creativity to take advantage of Toronto's unique position in New Media, communications, music, biotechnology, software, and high technology.
- Provide a clean environment by improving water quality, cleaning up contaminated soils, eliminating the risk of flooding, and naturalizing appropriate areas.
- establishment of a corporation separate from the government to oversee the revitalization.

Source: City of Toronto.

The Toronto Waterfront Revitalization Corporation was formed in 2001 to oversee and lead waterfront renewal. It has subsequently been renamed as Waterfront Toronto. The organization is jointly funded by the three levels of government. The organization is overseen at the federal level by the Department of Finance, at the provincial level by the Ministry of Energy and Infrastructure, and at the municipal level by the Waterfront Project Secretariat.

The organization is directed to support the following policy objectives of the three levels of government:

- Reducing urban sprawl
- Developing sustainable communities, particularly in the area of energy efficiency
- Redeveloping brownfields & cleaning up contaminated land
- Building more affordable housing
- Increasing economic competitiveness
- Creating more parks and public spaces

Source: Waterfront Toronto

== Governance ==
The President and CEO of Waterfront Toronto is George Zegarac, who joined the organization in 2019 after a 33-year tenure in the Ontario Public Service. The organization is governed by the following board of directors:

- Rahul Bhardwaj
- Leslie Woo
- Jeanhy Shim
- Ausma Malik
- Kevin Sullivan
- Drew Fagan
- Alysha Valenti
- Andrew MacLeod
- Wende Cartwright
- Laurie Payne
- Paul Khawaja
- Jack Winberg

Source: Waterfront Toronto

== Projects ==
=== Corus Quay ===
Corus Quay, originally named First Waterfront Place, is an eight-storey commercial office tower located on a 2.5-acre (10,000 m^{2}) Toronto waterfront site. Corus Quay is Corus Entertainment's new Toronto headquarters, consolidating its 10 locations and 1,200 employees into one site. The building is a collaboration between the Toronto Waterfront Revitalization Corporation and the Toronto Economic Development Corporation. The East Bayfront Precinct, where the building is located, is intended to be an important public destination as well as provide a range of housing and commercial opportunities.

The development achieved LEED (Leadership in Energy and Environmental Design) Gold status for the project's environmental sustainability. The LEED rating system recognizes leading-edge buildings that incorporate design, construction, and operational practices that combine healthy, high-quality, and high-performance advantages with reduced environmental impacts. In addition, Corus Quay has several green roof areas, a massive five-storey green living wall, 100 bicycle parking spaces, and public art installations created by award-winning U.K. artists, Troika.

=== Planned districts ===
- East Bayfront
- Port Lands
- Quayside
- West Don Lands

=== Other projects ===
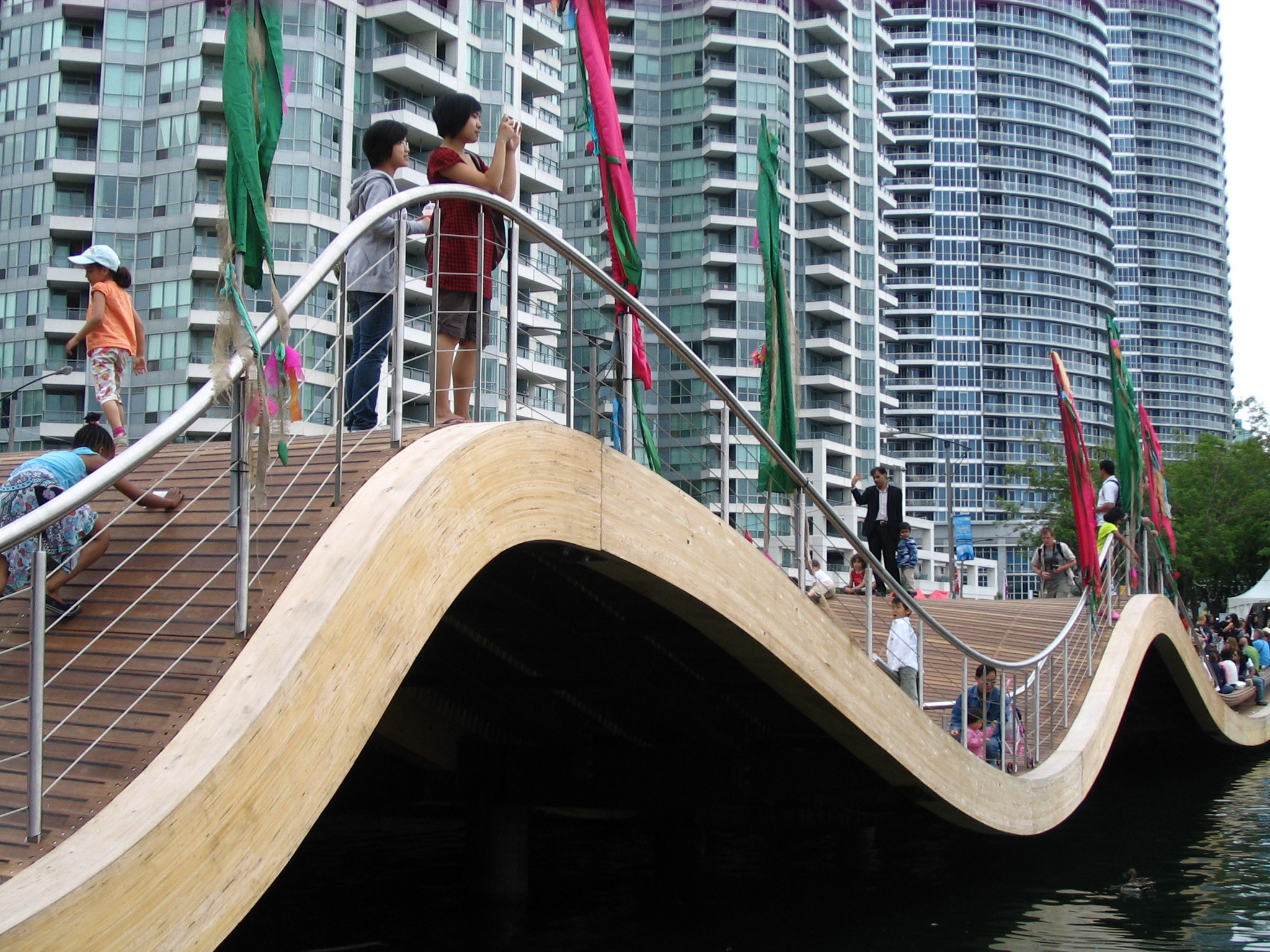
The Simcoe wavedeck on Toronto's waterfront

- The Bentway - Active space created from repurposing of under-utilized lands under the elevated Gardiner Expressway.
- Corktown Common - New park in the West Donlands development.
- HTO Park - New park along Toronto Harbour.
- Sherbourne Common - Public space incorporating play areas and stormwater-driven fountains.
- Sugar Beach - A public space with sandy areas and permanent umbrellas for sunbathing.
- Underpass Park - An active play space area located under the Eastern Avenue Bypass in a former 'dead' area. Inaugurated on August 2, 2012, it's the 18th public space built or revitalized by Waterfront Toronto since 2005.
- Ookwemin Minising (formerly Villiers Island) - Island being constructed as part of the naturalization of the mouth of the Don River.
- WaveDecks - A series of wooden deck structures designed with wave-like undulations that also serve as fish habitats.
- Love Park (Toronto) - A new park with a natural pond in the shape of a heart, developed in place of a previous highway off-ramp.
- Global Convenience - A temporary floating public art installation in the Harbour Square Park Basin.

Future projects include:

- Rees Street Park - new park from the parking lot south of the Rogers Centre.
- Lower Yonge Park - new park that is to be delivered as part of the development of the Lower Yonge Precinct.
- Port Lands Flood Protection Project - Naturalization of the Don River mouth is expected to complete by 2024. The project includes a new channel for the Don River.
- Revitalized Jack Layton Ferry Terminal.
- Waterfront Walk - a continuous promenade along the Toronto Harbour waterfront.

== See also ==
- Don River
- Transit City
- Sidewalk Toronto
- Waterfront Trail
