= Sherbourne Common =

Park in Toronto, Ontario, Canada

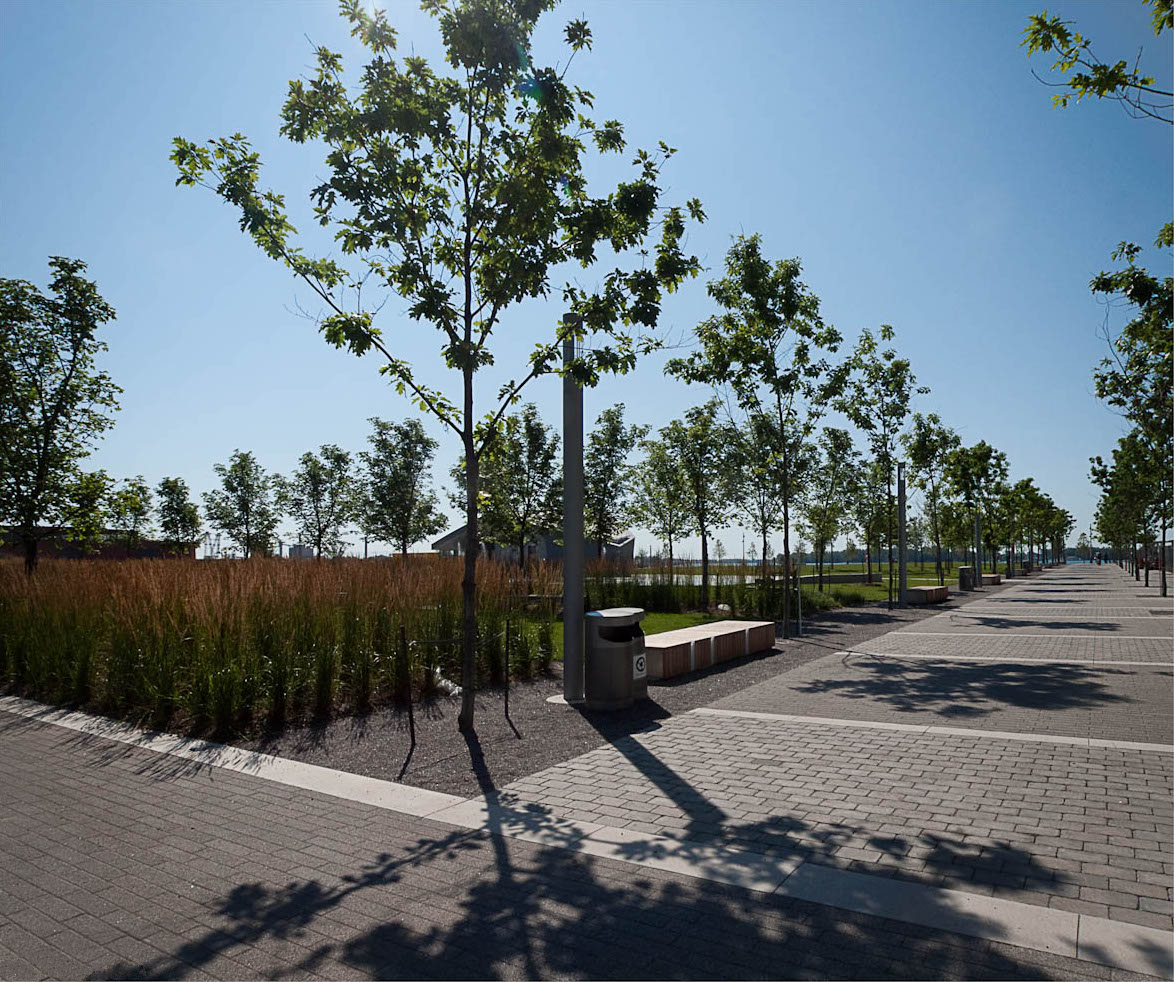
- Interactive map of Sherbourne Common
- Location: 61 Dockside Drive, Toronto, Ontario
- Coordinates: 43°38′42″N 79°21′54″W
- Area: 1.47 hectares (3.6 acres)
- Established: [July 23, 2009]
- Opened: [September 24, 2010 (south) July 26, 2011 (north)]
- Operator: Toronto Parks
- Website: Sherbourne Common

Sherbourne Common, designed by landscape architect Phillips Farevaag Smallenberg, is a waterfront park located in a former industrial area of Toronto. It is one of the earliest parks in Canada to incorporate a neighborhood-wide stormwater treatment facility into its design. Located east of Lower Sherbourne Street, the 1.47 hectare park spans two city blocks. It stretches from Lake Ontario to Lake Shore Boulevard in the north.

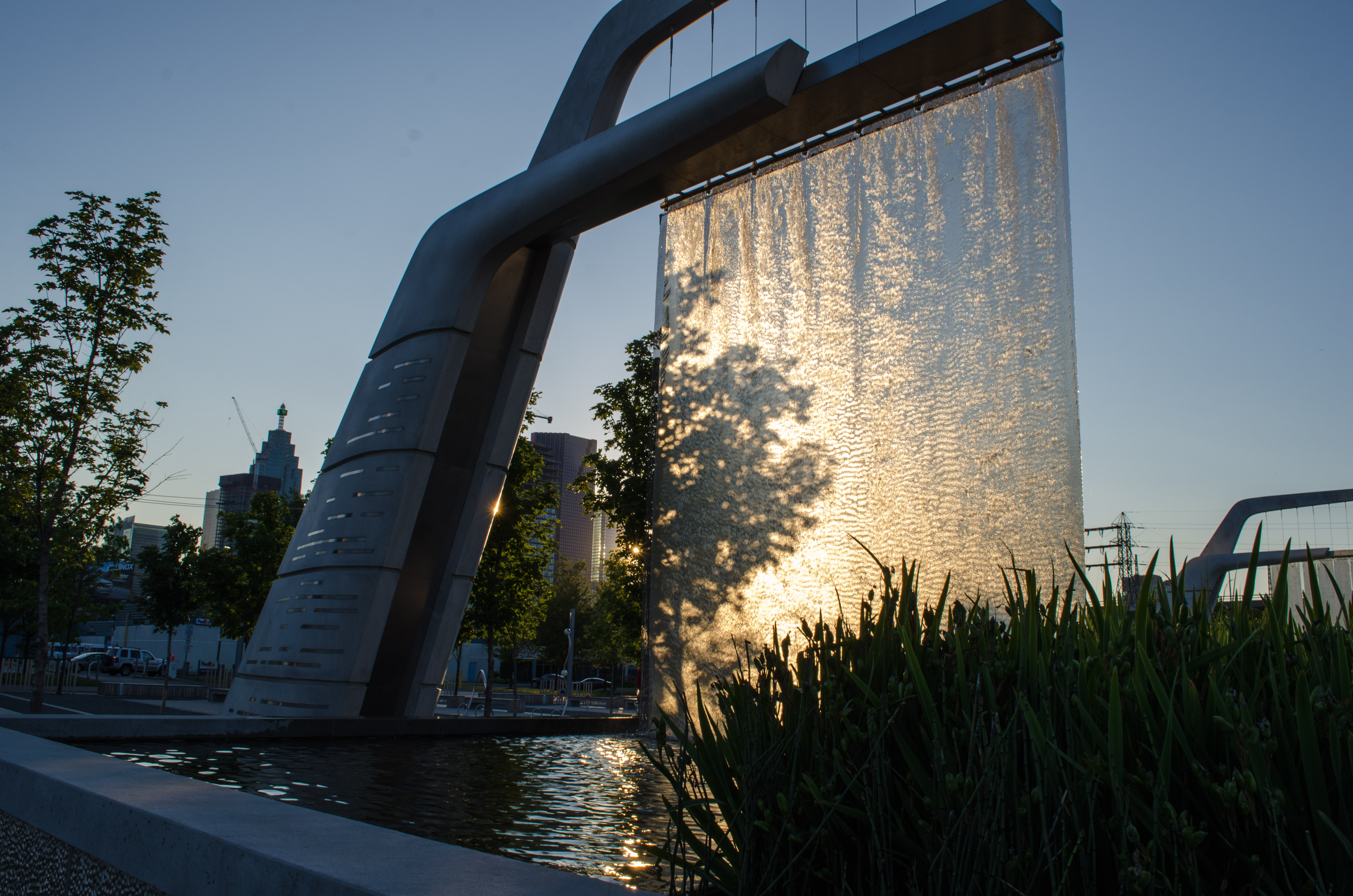
View of "Light Showers" art sculpture.

A Waterfront Toronto project, Sherbourne Common consists of a 240 meter long water channel featuring three art sculptures that rise nine meters, called "Light Showers", by artist Jill Anholt. The sculptures were made off-site utilizing reinforced fiberglass molds that were filled with agila concrete. In total, there are 182 planted trees, 108 Pacific Sunset Maple, 45 Red Oak, and 29 American Beech. The storm water treatment facility is located in the basement of the park’s Pavilion designed by Teeple Architects Inc . The plant treats the water and then returns it into the park through the three art installations.

== Sustainability best practices ==
This Toronto park follows through on water efficient landscaping, while at the same time Pavilion meets Toronto's Green Building Requirements and Leadership in Energy and Environmental Design. Storm-water treatment facility in the Pavilion is powered by the renewable energy sources. Purified water is pushed through three concrete public art objects, each 9 metres high, into the man-made water feature e.g. canal. Excess purified water is released into Lake Ontario.

The park has bicycle storage and access to public transportation.
