= Corus Quay =

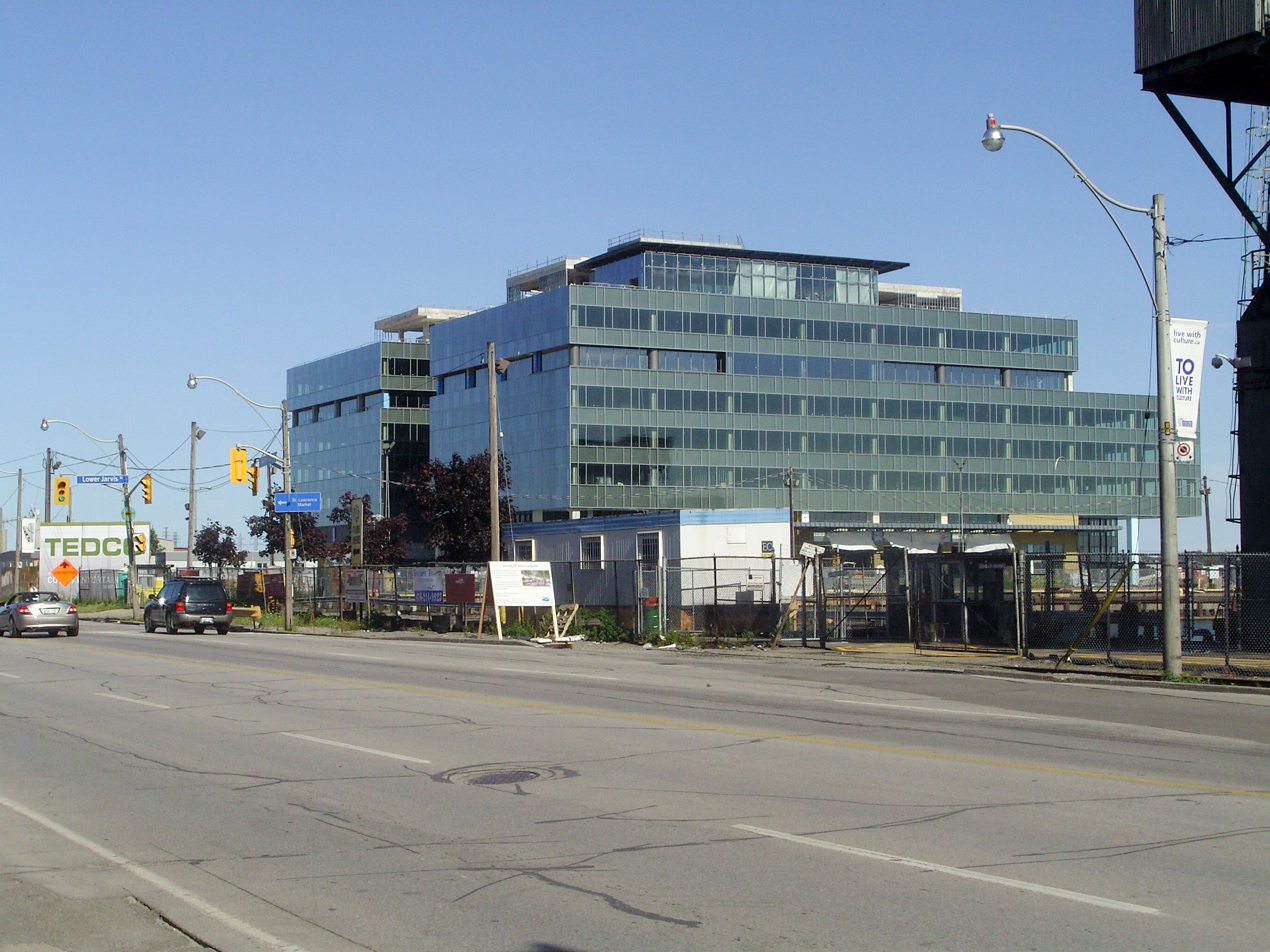
- View of Corus Quay under construction
- Former names: First Waterfront Place

General information
- Location: Toronto, Ontario, Canada, 25 Dockside Drive
- Coordinates: 43.6433°N 79.3672°W
- Completed: 2010
- Owner: George Brown College and Halmont Properties Corp

Technical details
- Floor count: 8
- Floor area: 43,000 m^{2} (460,000 sq ft)

Design and construction
- Architect: Diamond Schmitt Architects
- Developer: TEDCO
- Main contractor: Aecon Buildings Architects

Website
- www.quaymediaservices.com

Corus Quay, originally named First Waterfront Place, is an eight-storey commercial office tower located on a 2.5-acre (1.0 ha) waterfront site in Toronto, Ontario, Canada. The CA$160 million building is the first major development planned for the East Bayfront district, and completed construction at the foot of Jarvis Street or Jarvis Street Slip. Corus Quay is Corus Entertainment's new Toronto headquarters, consolidating its 10 locations and 1,200 employees into one site. The building was designed by Diamond Schmitt Architects with interiors completed by Quadrangle Architects. The building was being developed by the Toronto Economic Development Corporation (TEDCO), a city agency. Funding for the project came from TEDCO's equity, city loans and a CA$12.5 million contribution from the city contributed via Waterfront Toronto.

The building is intended to be an important public destination as well as provide a range of housing and commercial opportunities. No residential or education facilities could be built near the existing Redpath Sugar plant until TEDCO's Corus building buffered the new development from the old industrial uses. However, many aspects of the project have been mired in controversy.

Corus Quay is located near the previous site of the Waterside Sports Tennis Club, which was looking for a new location "waterside". But as neither the city nor Waterfront Toronto found an alternative site, Waterside Sports had to close down and went out of business.

In addition to Corus' business operations, the facility houses the company's television and radio operations in Toronto, including the studios of radio stations CFMJ, CFNY-FM and CILQ-FM, and the secondary studio for Global Toronto and Global's The Morning Show, in late 2016. This building has never housed the main headquarters of Family Channel, but it has housed the master control room before 2017.

In 2012, Corus Quay hosted the 2012 Beyblade World Championship tournament finals in which the Japanese representative Ryo Takahashi won the championship.

== Timeline ==
- 2005 The Toronto Waterfront Revitalization Corporation (TWRC) created a design review panel, chaired by Bruce Kuwabara, to bring more transparent discussions to the development of the waterfront. This site was to be the first significant project for the TWRC's design review panel and the first major building to be constructed on Toronto's East Bayfront.
- 2005 five firms, including Koetter Kim & Associates International and Diamond Schmitt Architects, are shortlisted by the Toronto Waterfront Redevelopment Corp. to propose a development plan for the East Bayfront waterfront, between Yonge and Parliament Sts. Boston's Kim Koetter is the successful firm.
- 2005, TEDCO hires Diamond Schmitt Architects, to design a plan for the portion of the precinct that TEDCO owned. The Diamond Schmitt proposal is largely the same as the plan the waterfront agency rejected but TEDCO argues that their plan covered only a portion of the precinct—only the part that TEDCO was the responsible land owner.
- 2006 two municipal agencies have competing visions and plans for the waterfront. Mayor David Miller steps forward in favour of the TEDCO plan, raising concerns and criticism from observers of preferential treatment, secrecy and backroom deals. Despite this, it is unclear which agency has the mandate to control the waterfront lands. Although TEDCO was negotiating with a media company to bring over 1,000 knowledge workers to the waterfront at the site it owned.
- 2006 TWRC abandons the new community and destination neighbourhood proposal developed and approved by Koetter Kim & Associates International, instead favouring a commercial development, as TWRC never came forward with funding or a plan for a public building or museum on that site despite $1.5 Billion the waterfront agency received from the three orders of government.
- February 2007 TEDCO announces that a portion of the area will be developed under the code-name of "Project Symphony," a previously undisclosed plan for an office building that will be home to major commercial tenant who required confidentiality during negotiations. Despite TEDCO providing all details to the City and the TWRC in confidence, the National Post criticized the way TEDCO does business and said that it uses "shadowy negotiations and will, presumably, announce the winner as a fait accompli."
- April 2007 TEDCO signs a deal with a media company that will move its 1,100 employees from "all over" Toronto to the new building. TEDCO, TWRC and the City cannot say who the tenant is because the company is publicly traded. This fueled speculation of a secret deal between TEDCO and the mystery tenant, but there was no mystery as the tenant was in fact a media company.
- April 2007 The architect approved by the tenant and hired by TEDCO, Jack Diamond, presents his plan to a design review panel to very negative feedback. Rival architects who compete with Diamond but who sit on the review panel claim that "the plan lacked magic, the design did not engage the public, and that he should raise the bar higher."
- May 2007 city council executive committee endorses the $159.5 million taxpayer-financed waterfront building, which was then to be rented to the media company at a significant profit and a major increase in the tax base for the city from those lands.
- May 2007 city staff report says the project will "yield a financial return lower than would be acceptable for a private investor given the risk profile". TEDCO defends its plan by arguing that the deal is necessary in order to retain a "high-tech, creative employer", one critics say wasn't threatening to leave town. A commercial building was also required for planning and environmental reasons on that site otherwise universities, housing and other "sensitive" uses could not happen in that area of the waterfront (i.e. there was a need to buffer the heavy industrial use of Redpath Sugar). TEDCO claims first-in tenants need a tax break to locate in currently isolated (but future prime) waterfront property. Other than TEDCO's film studio in the Portlands, no one had invested in the waterfront under the TWRC plan as yet. [That was still the case in the summer of 2011, although the province of Ontario funded a new building for George Brown College next door to TEDCO's media company building].
- June 2007 Corus reveals itself as TEDCO's mystery media tenant. Toronto City Council overwhelmingly approves a deal that will have taxpayers initially finance the building under the following scheme: TEDCO is the developer and owner of the building, city lends TEDCO $132 million secured by a mortgage, Waterfront Toronto contributes the $12.5 million, which came from TEDCO's shareholder the city, and TEDCO provides another $10 million equity in addition to the value of the land ($5 million). Furthermore, Corus gets a partial tax abatement in the first few years and will pay $24 million in taxes over the 20 years of its lease instead of $42 million. But tax revenues from that land before Corus were less than $100,000 per year. The city and its taxpayers through TEDCO also receives 25 times the rent revenue from the Corus project than from the previous use of the land.
- June 2007 Jack Diamond submits revised plans to the design review board that include additional architectural elements including: an egg-shaped studio visible within a light-filled atrium dividing two halves of office towers and a restaurant that spills out into an outdoor lakeside café. The plan is praised for its beauty and novelty and for succeeding in enhancing the public realm.
- Summer 2007 construction begins.
- November 2007 the revised architectural renderings omit several key architectural features, including the praised egg-shaped auditorium replacing it with a square-shaped studio and large screens to be visible to the public walking by. Some design review panelists allege that the building, which was supposed to enhance the public realm, will be no more than an ordinary office building.
- December 2007 the waterfront board votes to withhold $9 million of its $12.5 million contribution unless the economic development corporation and its architects work closely with the design review panel to solve several major alleged architectural flaws. No minutes of the design review panel meeting were provided to TEDCO nor made public at the time. The design review panel objects to changes in the design and to the alleged use of cheaper materials than promised, which TEDCO disputed.
- February 2008 Cinespace Film Studios, the film production company that leased a building from TEDCO on this site for 12 years vacates the property following TEDCO's orders. Jim Mirkopoulos of Cinespace wrote to the Toronto Star saying "TEDCO's 'Project Symphony' reverses seven years of waterfront consultations by placing a commercial building at the site contravenes the mandated architectural competitive process to achieve design excellence and only transplants existing jobs from Liberty Village instead of attracting new ones, as originally advertised." Cinespace's lease with TEDCO ended two years prior to that but they were holding over on the site and wanted to remain. Cinespace did not want anything on that site but the old one-story building they had rented from TEDCO even though their lease expired.
- August 2009 construction of glass curtain wall reaches the roof, external construction of building is nearly complete.
- February 2010 TEDCO (by then split up 3 ways by Mayor David Miller into Build Toronto, Toronto Port Lands Company and Invest Toronto Inc) delivers the base building to Corus on-time and on-budget so that Corus can begin its interior tenant fit out.
- March 2012 Corus acquired the building from the Toronto Port Lands Company and immediately sold it to H&R Real Estate Investment Trust.
- December 2023 H&R REIT sells the property to George Brown College and Halmont Properties Corp. Corus continues to be the building's primary tenant, with their lease set to expire on March 22, 2033.
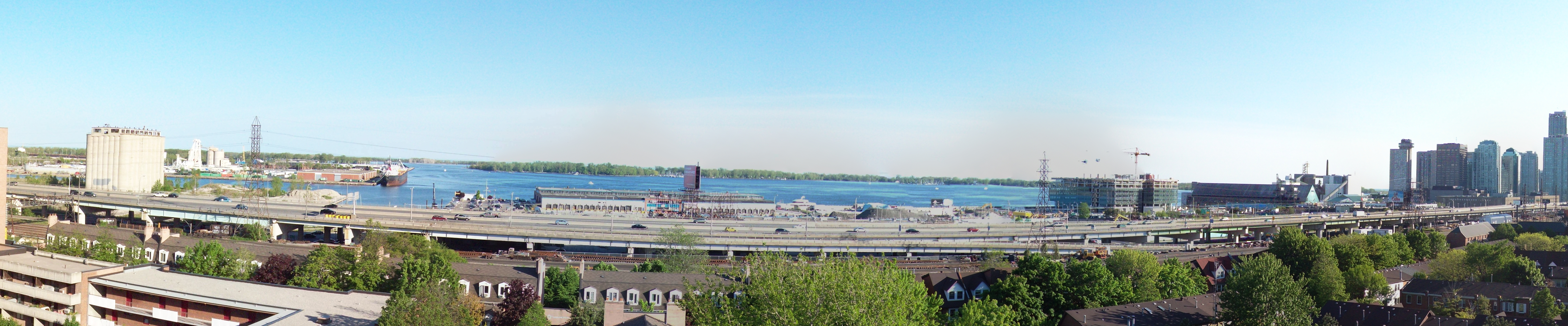
East Bayfront under construction, showing the Corus Quay to the right

== Sustainable design ==
This TEDCO development achieved LEED (Leadership in Energy and Environmental Design) Gold status for the project's environmental sustainability. The LEED rating system recognizes leading-edge buildings that incorporate design, construction and operational practices that combine healthy, high-quality and high-performance advantages with reduced environmental impacts.

In addition, TEDCO's Corus Quay building will boast several green roof areas, a massive five-storey green living wall, 100 bicycle parking spaces, AutoShare hybrid vehicles on site, and public art installations created by award-winning U.K. artists, Troika.

== See also ==
- Waterfront Toronto
- Toronto waterfront
- Corus Entertainment
- Corus Radio
