= Jarvis Street =

Thoroughfare in Toronto, Ontario

Coordinates: 43°39′37.5″N 79°22′33″W

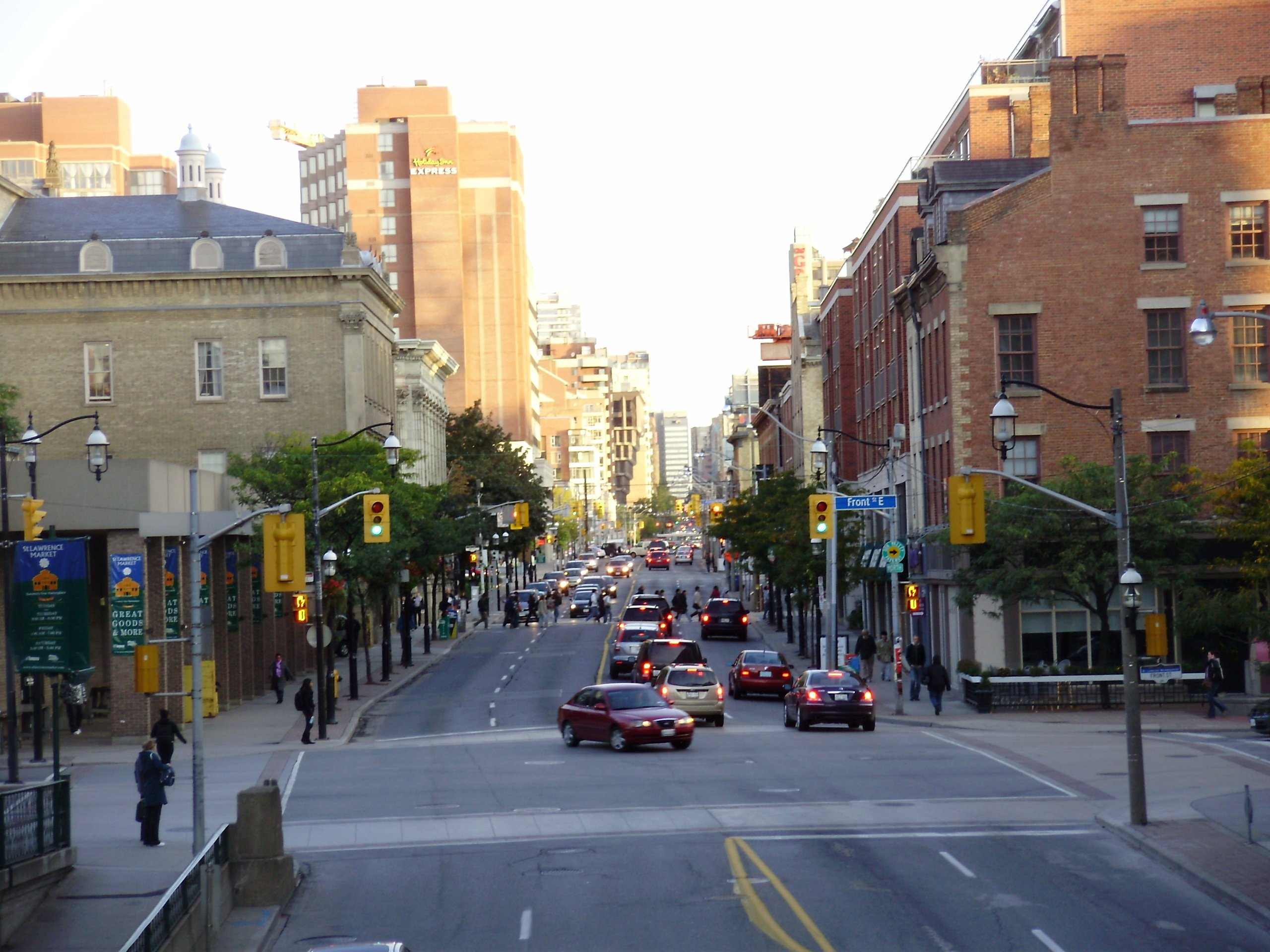
- Morning traffic at Jarvis and Front in 2008

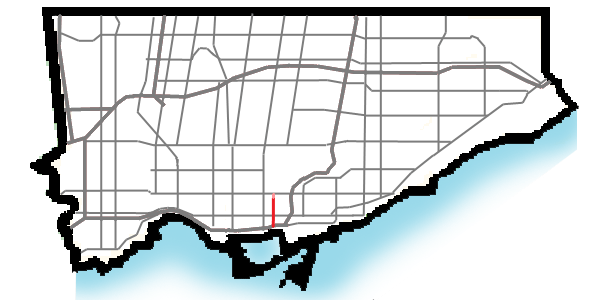
- Jarvis Street (red); Ted Rogers Way (pink)
- Maintained by: City of Toronto government
- Length: 3.2 km (2.0 mi)
- Location: Toronto
- South end: Queens Quay
- Major junctions: King Street; Queen Street
- North end: Mount Pleasant Road / Ted Rogers Way

Other
Nearby arterial roads in Toronto
← Yonge Street	Sherbourne Street →

Jarvis Street is a north–south thoroughfare in downtown Toronto, Ontario, Canada, passing through some of the oldest developed areas in the city. Its alignment extends from Queens Quay East in the south to Bloor Street in the north. The segment south of Front Street is known as "Lower Jarvis Street" while the segment from Bloor Street to Mount Pleasant Road is known as "Ted Rogers Way".

The street is a mix of older buildings dating back to the 1800s, including St. Lawrence Market, and has a large proportion of recent condominium apartment buildings. The street is considered by traffic engineers as an important artery to carry commuter traffic before and after work hours. To this end, a reversible lane was built in the mid-20th century along much of its length to allocate lanes. As well, Mount Pleasant Road was extended south to Jarvis and an intersection to the Gardiner Expressway was constructed. The City of Toronto initiated a redevelopment of the street in the early 2000s that widened sidewalks, added cycling lanes and removed the reversible lane. After less than two years, a subsequent City government removed the cycling lanes to nearby Sherbourne Street and the reversible lane was reinstated.

== Ted Rogers Way ==
Ted Rogers Way
- Interactive map of Ted Rogers Way
- Maintained by: City of Toronto government
- Length: 0.16 km (0.099 mi)
- Location: Toronto
- South end: Jarvis Street / Mount Pleasant Road
- North end: Bloor Street

Construction
- Inauguration: December 2, 2009

Ted Rogers Way is a north–south road in downtown Toronto, Ontario, Canada. It is the northern portion of Jarvis Street.

On December 2, 2009, the north portion of Jarvis Street (from Charles Street to Bloor Street) was renamed Ted Rogers Ways to commemorate Ted Rogers.

== Description ==
Jarvis Street begins at Queens Quay East as a four-lane two-way arterial road. At its foot is Jarvis Slip, used for freighters delivering sugar cane to the Redpath Sugar Refinery and home to Corus Quay. This section, north to Front Street is known as Lower Jarvis Street. Street numbering starts again at Front Street and increases northward. At the intersection of Front and Jarvis Street is St. Lawrence Market on the west side. A market has been in this place since 1803. The street continues north as a four-lane two-way street to Richmond Street, where it becomes a five-lane street, with a center lane that carries traffic north or south depending on the time of day.

North of Front Street, on the west side is St. Lawrence Market North and St. Lawrence Hall at King Street, while on the east side are some heritage three-storey buildings and a recent infill development. North of King Street on the west side is St. James Park, which is next to St. James Cathedral, while on the east side are more heritage three-storey brick buildings. North of Queen Street on the east side is Moss Park Armoury. On the west side is the Salvation Army Toronto Harbor Light hostel and mission. Both buildings use up most of the block from Queen to Shuter.

North of Shuter to Gerrard Street, the street has been mostly redeveloped, with several mid-rise and high-rise residential towers, and a recent condominium apartment building at Dundas Street. Interspersed are heritage buildings, including row houses and three-storey commercial buildings. The Hilton Garden Inn and the Grand Hotel, which was formerly the Royal Canadian Mounted Police Toronto headquarters, are located on this stretch, as well as the former Sears Canada office building at 222 Jarvis Street. On the east side, a few mansions dating to Victorian times remain. Along the east side is the Ontario Court of Justice building at 333 Jarvis, and several mid-rise apartment buildings on the west side.

North of Gerrard, the Jarvis Street Baptist Church remains on the north-east corner, while most of the east side from Gerrard to Carlton Street is the Allan Gardens park. Along the west side, mostly 20th-century apartment buildings take up the block, along with an older mansion at 362 Jarvis which has been repurposed for offices. North of Carlton are more 20th-century apartment buildings. A stretch of Victorian-era townhomes still exist on the west side north of Carlton, while the east side is occupied by more residential apartment complexes.

On the west side at 354 Jarvis is the former Havergal Ladies' College building dating from 1898, which later became a Canadian Broadcasting Corporation studio building (from 1945 to 1996) and is now the Margaret McCain Academic Building at the National Ballet School of Canada. The Georgian Revival style house at 372 Jarvis was built in 1856 for Oliver Mowat (1820–1903), who later served as Premier of Ontario (1872–1896) and then Lieutenant Governor of Ontario (1897–1903). The building is now part of the National Ballet School site, where it is known as Lozinski House and used as administrative offices.

At 404 Jarvis is the Betty Oliphant Theatre, which repurposes several old mansions on the west side of the street, while several old townhomes have been adapted for commercial uses on the east side. North of Maitland on the east side is Jarvis Collegiate Institute, which occupies most of the block from Maitland to Wellesley Street. North of Wellesley, several old mansions remain, which have been repurposed for restaurants or commercial use. Most of the area has been completely redeveloped with residential apartments.

North of Isabella Street, Jarvis is a six-lane arterial road. It intersects with the four-lane arterial road Mount Pleasant Road just south of Bloor Street. Mount Pleasant continues to the north, passing under Bloor Street. Along this stretch, Jarvis is mostly high-rise towers, including the headquarters of Rogers Communications. North of Mount Pleasant, Jarvis is again a four-lane arterial road and ends at Bloor Street, the last segment named "Ted Rogers Way" after the founder of Rogers Communications.

== History ==
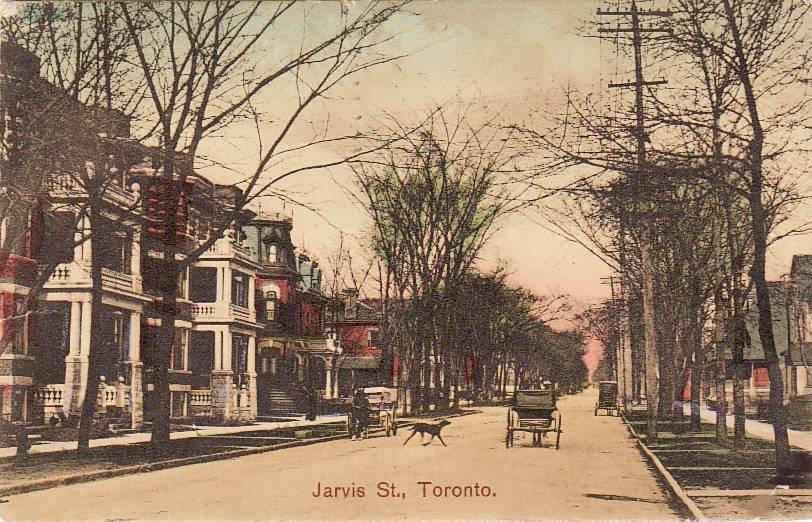
Jarvis Street, 1909

The original segment of the street went from Front Street in the south to Lot Street (Queen Street today). It was originally called New Street and it was the first new north–south street in the first expansion of York. It was later renamed 'Nelson' and it was known as this during the time of the 1849 Great Fire of Toronto. The street was laid out in the first expansion of York, the east side being the original town site, and the west side being the site of the new public market (St. Lawrence Market). The commercial core of the town was at King and Nelson, centred around the public market on the south-west corner. The first City Hall was at King and Nelson, then moved south in 1845 to Front and Nelson. After the 1849 fire, the old city hall site was used for St. Lawrence Hall, and the public market moved behind, between the hall and the city hall.

The segment north of Lot Street, originally extending only as far as Wellesley Street in the north, was created from the sale of Samuel Jarvis's (the street's namesake) estate Hazel Burn and surrounding lands in 1845 and was later developed as a residential neighbourhood for the city's rich. Major landmarks on or near Jarvis include Jarvis Collegiate Institute, Toronto Metropolitan University, Rogers Building, Allan Gardens, 222 Jarvis Street, the Consulate General of Indonesia. Since the end of the nineteenth century, much of the wealthier population moved northward toward Rosedale.

The segment south of Front Street was first laid out after the construction of The Esplanade and the railway right-of-way in the 1850s and 1860s, which extended the shoreline to the south. Before 1884, the street was named Jarvis along its whole length.

In October 2009, Toronto City Council voted in favour of renaming the final block of Jarvis, from Charles to Bloor and running alongside the 777 Jarvis section of the Rogers Building, Ted Rogers Way. Black Lives Matter in Toronto has called on Canadians to remember that Samuel Jarvis and his father William Jarvis were slave owners and prominent defenders of the practice.

In 2010, Sugar Beach opened at the foot of Lower Jarvis and Queens Quay. This urban waterfront park features a landlocked man-made beach, the second one located in Toronto.

=== Bicycle lanes ===
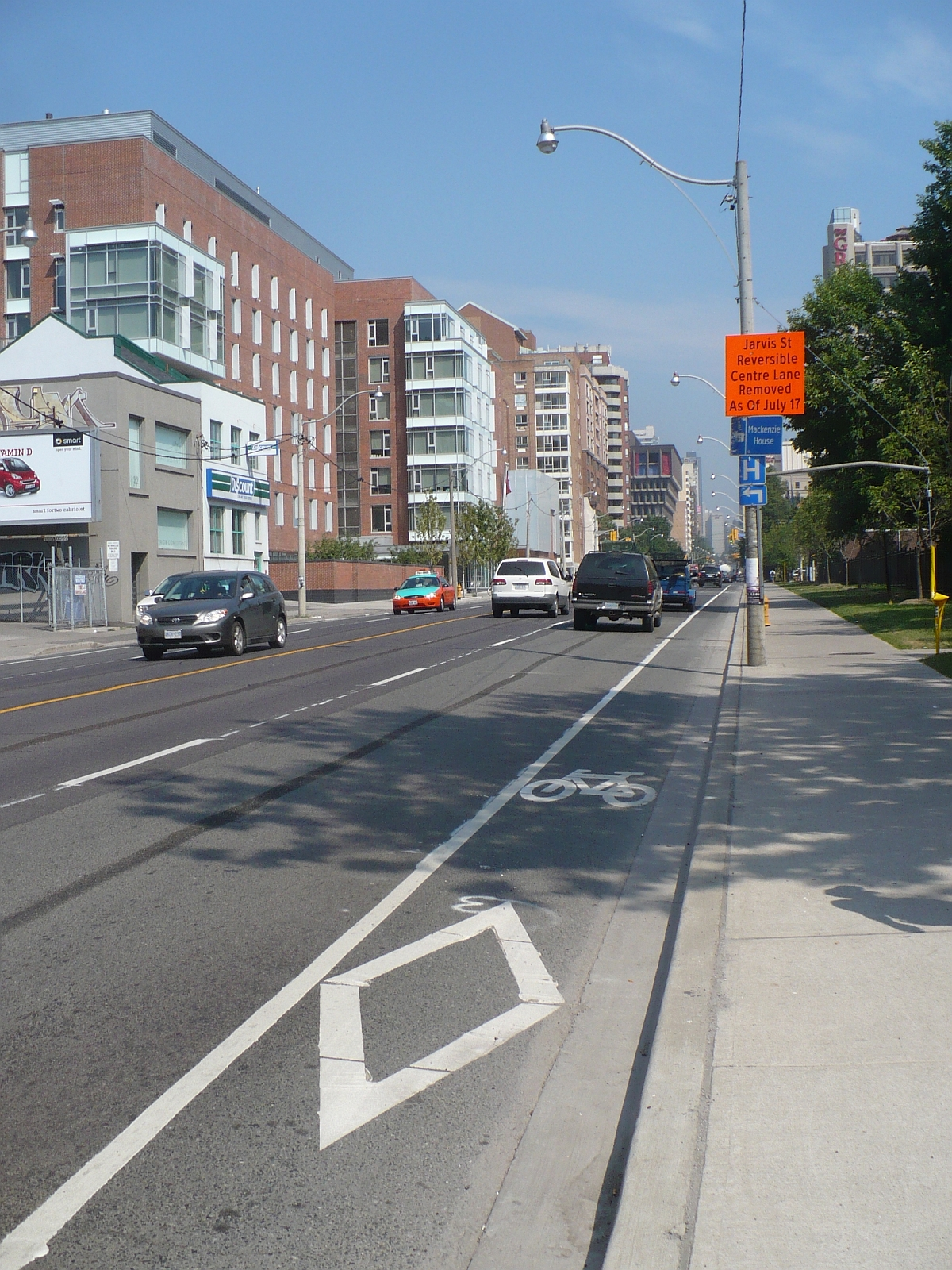
New bike lanes were installed in 2010, and removed again in 2012

On May 25, 2009, Toronto City Council voted 28–16 to remove the reversible centre commuter traffic lane and improve the streetscape by widening sidewalks, planting trees, installing heritage plaques, and implementing bicycle lanes.

In 2011, after the election of new mayor Rob Ford, a new Council voted to remove the bicycle lanes and reinstate the previous configuration. The Council opted for a new bicycle route along the parallel Sherbourne Street.

On November 17, 2012, following removal of the bicycle lanes, the reversible centre lane reopened.
