= Captain John's Harbour Boat Restaurant =

Restaurant in Toronto, Ontario, Canada

Coordinates: 43.641362°N 79.374387°W

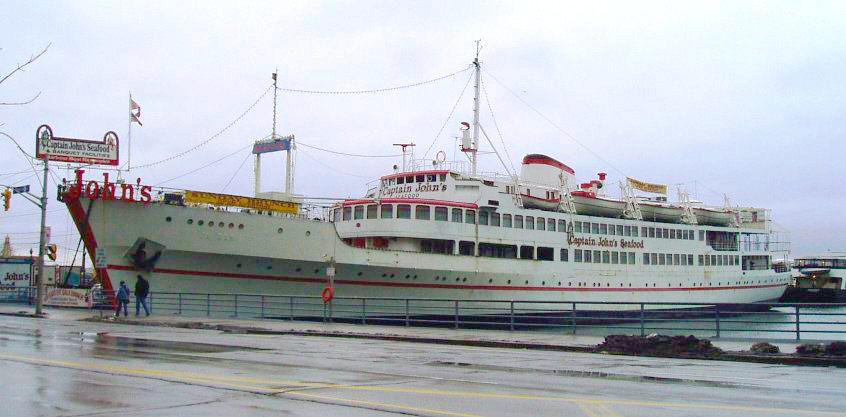
- The MS Jadran, the second home of Captain John's Harbour Boat Restaurant in December 2005.

History
- Name: MS Jadran
- Owner: Jadrolinija 1957-1975, John Letnik 1975-2015
- Operator: Jadrolinija 1957-1975, John Letnik 1975-2015
- Port of registry: Rijeka, Yugoslavia 1957-1975
- Builder: Brodogradiliste "Split" Shipyards, Brodosplit, Split, Yugoslavia
- Completed: 1957
- Acquired: 1957
- In service: 1957-1975
- Out of service: 1975
- Fate: Sold in 1975 and operated as floating restaurant in Toronto from 1975-2012; towed from Toronto Harbour May 28, 2015, scrapped

General characteristics
- Class & type: J Class passenger ferry
- Tonnage: 2,564 GT
- Length: 89.9 m (294 ft 11 in)
- Beam: 13.1 m (43 ft 0 in)
- Draught: 4.6 m (15 ft 1 in)
- Decks: 3
- Propulsion: 2 x Sulzer Type diesel engines
- Speed: 18.0 knots (33.3 km/h; 20.7 mph)
- Capacity: 191 passengers (159 first class, 32 tourist)

Captain John's Harbour Boat Restaurant (incorporated as 1518756 Ontario Inc.) was a restaurant and banquet hall in Toronto, Ontario, Canada. For most of its existence it was located in the MS Jadran, a former Adriatic passenger ship that was permanently docked at the foot of Yonge Street at 1 Queens Quay West on Toronto's waterfront. The ship was moored off on a small laneway at the foot of Yonge Street called Captain John's Pier. Once a prestige destination, the restaurant was open every day of the year, including all major holidays such as Christmas and New Year's Day, for almost 40 years. When it opened, the waterfront was an industrial Portland. The Harbourfront redevelopment turned the area into a recreational destination for residents and tourists and a residential neighbourhood; Captain John's helped begin a gentrification process that ultimately claimed it as a victim.

== History ==
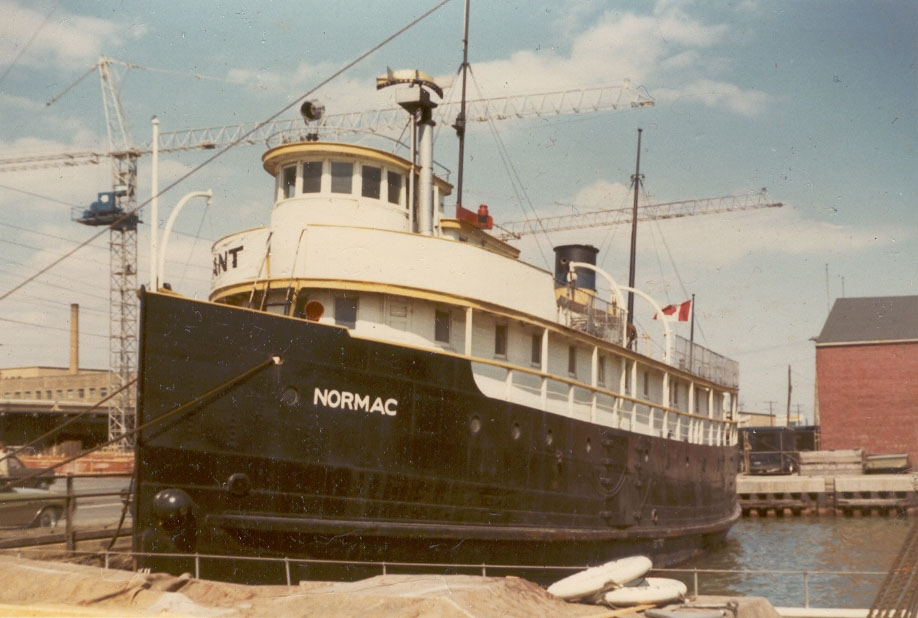
The MS Normac, first home of Captain John's Harbour Boat Restaurant, in Toronto Harbour

The restaurant was owned and operated by John Letnik, who came to Canada as a refugee from FPR Yugoslavia in 1957. Letnik found work at an Etobicoke country club and ultimately became its chef, before opening his own restaurant in 1961, the Pop Inn at Dundas and McCaul which he ran for seven years. He came up with the idea of opening an onboard restaurant while travelling to Europe via ship in the late 1960s to visit relatives. He opened Toronto's first floating restaurant aboard the MS Normac in 1970. The Normac had served several years as a fire boat with the Detroit Fire Department and then as a ferry that traveled between Tobermory and Manitoulin Island.

In 1975, Letnik bought the larger Jadran from the Yugoslav government for $1 million and moored it alongside the Normac, operating it as a second restaurant. The Jadran was one of three luxury cruise ships built in Split in 1957; it was one of 3 "J" Class passenger ferries built for Jadrolinija (Jadranska Linijska Plovidba company) at the Brodogradiliste shipyard, its sister ships being MS Jugoslavija and MS Jedinstvo. For several years the Jadran operated as a luxury cruise ship in the Adriatic and Aegean seas and later served as a private ocean-going presidential yacht for Yugoslav president Josip Broz Tito and his entourage.

The floating ships were one of the first attractions in the area that became known as Harbourfront and was a pioneer in the waterfront's transformation from an industrial port to a recreational, artistic and residential area and tourist attraction. As well as being its owner, Letnik also served as one of its chefs. In 1976, Captain John's was the site of the first CHIN Radio annual bikini contest. The event was held at the restaurant again in 1977 before moving to Toronto Island the next year as part of the annual CHIN picnic.

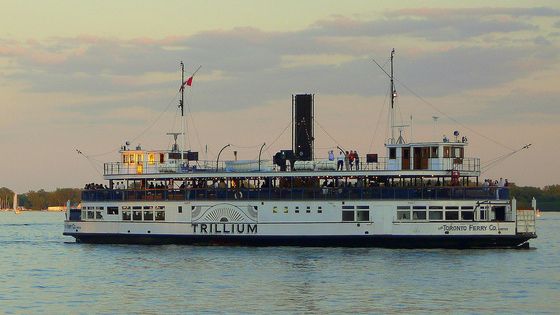
The PS Trillium, which struck the MS Normac in 1981 leading it to sink.

On June 2, 1981, the Normac was struck by the Trillium, a ferry operated by Metro Toronto Parks. The crash was caused by a mechanical failure aboard the Trillium which prevented the engine from reversing to slow down. The crash occurred at relatively slow speed, as the Trillium was in the midst of attempting to dock. None of the 132 passengers aboard the Trillium nor the 290 diners aboard the Normac were injured. Repairs were immediately made to the Normac, and for two weeks no leak was observed on board. However, on June 16, 1981, the Normac suddenly sank. This set off a long legal battle between Letnik and the city. The Federal Court initially ruled in favour of the city, as Letnik could not prove the collision caused the sinking, and because he failed to properly maintain the boat after converting it into a restaurant. This decision was overturned on appeal, and Letnik was awarded damages, though reportedly not enough to compensate for the destruction.

While the legal battle was ongoing, the Toronto Harbour Commission ordered Letnik to remove the Normac from its resting site. Thus, in 1986, on the fifth anniversary of its sinking, the vessel was raised at an estimated cost of $100,000. The Normac was later refurbished and serves as a floating restaurant in Port Dalhousie, Ontario. The Jadran was the sole home of Captain John's after then.

In the 1970s and 1980s, the floating restaurant attracted prominent diners such as Bob Hope, Brian Mulroney, Mel Lastman, Robert Campeau, The Village People and Steve Stavro, and was a sought-after location for weddings, bar mitzvahs and other events. However, in its latter years it lost favour as the city's gastronomical scene became more sophisticated and diverse and by 2002 Letnik was seeking bankruptcy protection Later reviews from local papers rated its culinary fare as average, despite the restaurant's boasts of having "the best seafood in town!", and reviews by patrons were decidedly mixed. The restaurant's clientele was primarily tourists with many bus tours stopping at the venue, as well as wedding receptions, bar mitzvahs and other parties.

By the twenty-first century, Captain John's was viewed by some as an out-of-date eyesore hurting the view from and the property values of a neighbouring condominium development. At the same time, the ship itself by now required a major overhaul to address issues of rust, fading paint and corrosion, making operations there potentially dangerous.

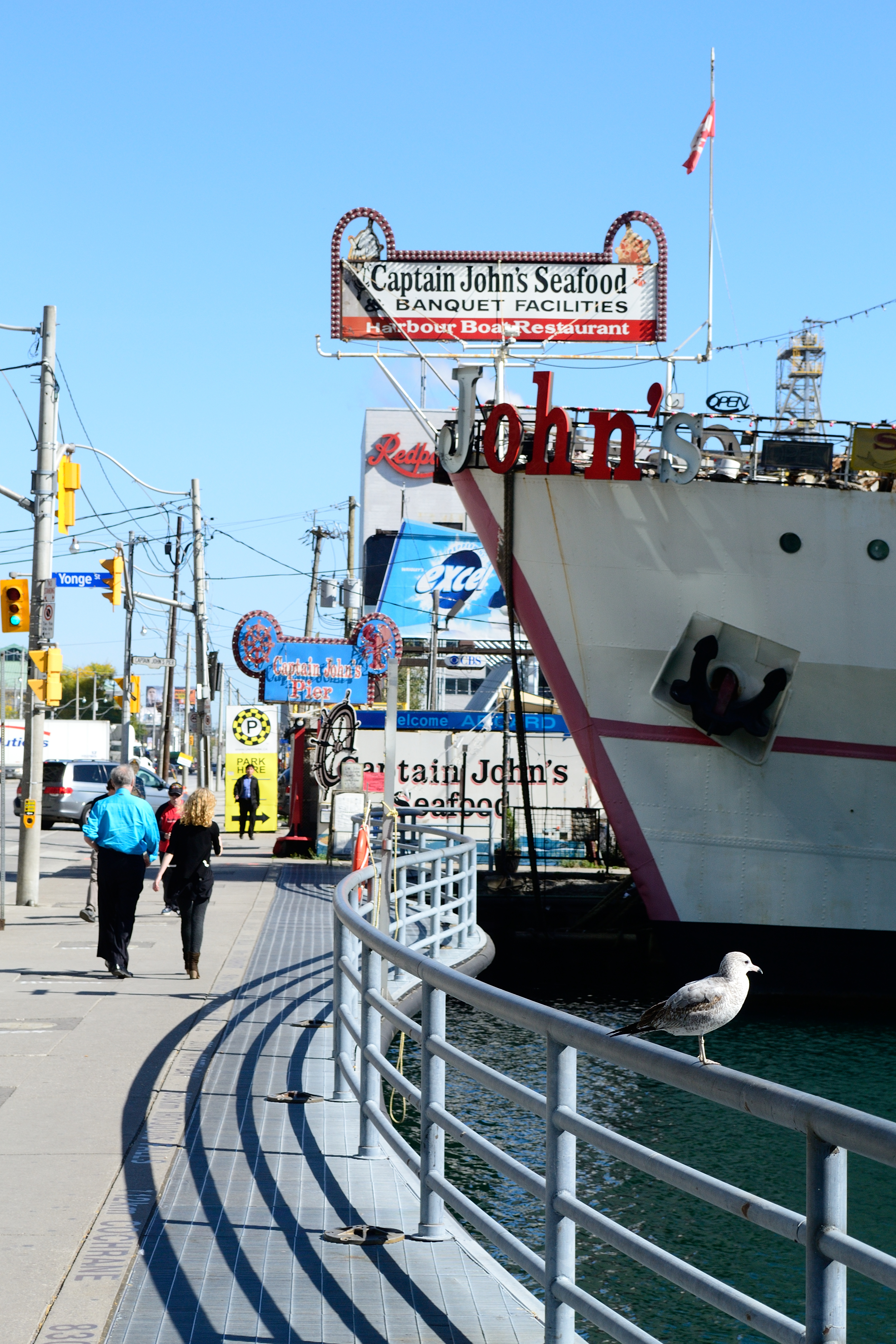
Captain John's Harbour Boat Restaurant moored at the foot of Yonge St in 2011.

=== Bankruptcy, closure and sale ===
In 2002 Captain John's filed for bankruptcy protection following a 10-year legal battle with Letnik's former common-law wife who the court ruled was entitled to a half-share of the restaurant. Owing over $5 million to various creditors including $3 million to unsecured creditors, Letnik's bankruptcy proposal involved the repayment of all unsecured creditors owed $5,000 or less and a repayment of no more than $30,000 to all other unsecured creditors. The restaurant staff, which once numbered in the dozens, was reduced to ten. In 2007, Letnik appealed his property tax bill arguing that the ship is not a "structure" under the law and thus cannot have property tax levied against it. The court ruled against him and a subsequent appeal was rejected as Letnik's unpaid back taxes mounted.

In August 2008, Toronto public health officials ordered the restaurant closed after citing it for 11 separate infractions, including "Operator fail to maintain premises free of sewage back-up" and "Operator fail to ensure food is not contaminated/adulterated". The owner was fined $2,160.

==== Attempts to sell ====
In 2009, owner John Letnik put the restaurant up for sale at a list price of $1.5 million but was unable to sell it, even after reducing his asking price to $1.25 million.

In June 2012, the Toronto Port Authority rescinded the lease agreement for the slip where the ship was moored, citing over $500,000 in payments owed for back taxes, rent and utility payments. At the same time the city shut off the boat's water supply, leading the health department to order the restaurant closed due to the staff's inability to sanitize dishes and wash their hands. Letnik was given until July 27, 2012, to remove the boat's gangplank and all restaurant signs, and the port authority invoked marine law ordering that the ship "must refrain from leaving" until its debts to the city and the authority is paid. The Jadran's engine had been removed, and the ship was mired in mud, requiring it to be towed as it could not sail under its own power.

In September 2013, with Letnik owing more than $1 million in taxes, licensing fees, and berthing fees, the city initiated the process of seizing the vessel. Letnik declared he would not abandon the ship and might even chain himself to it.

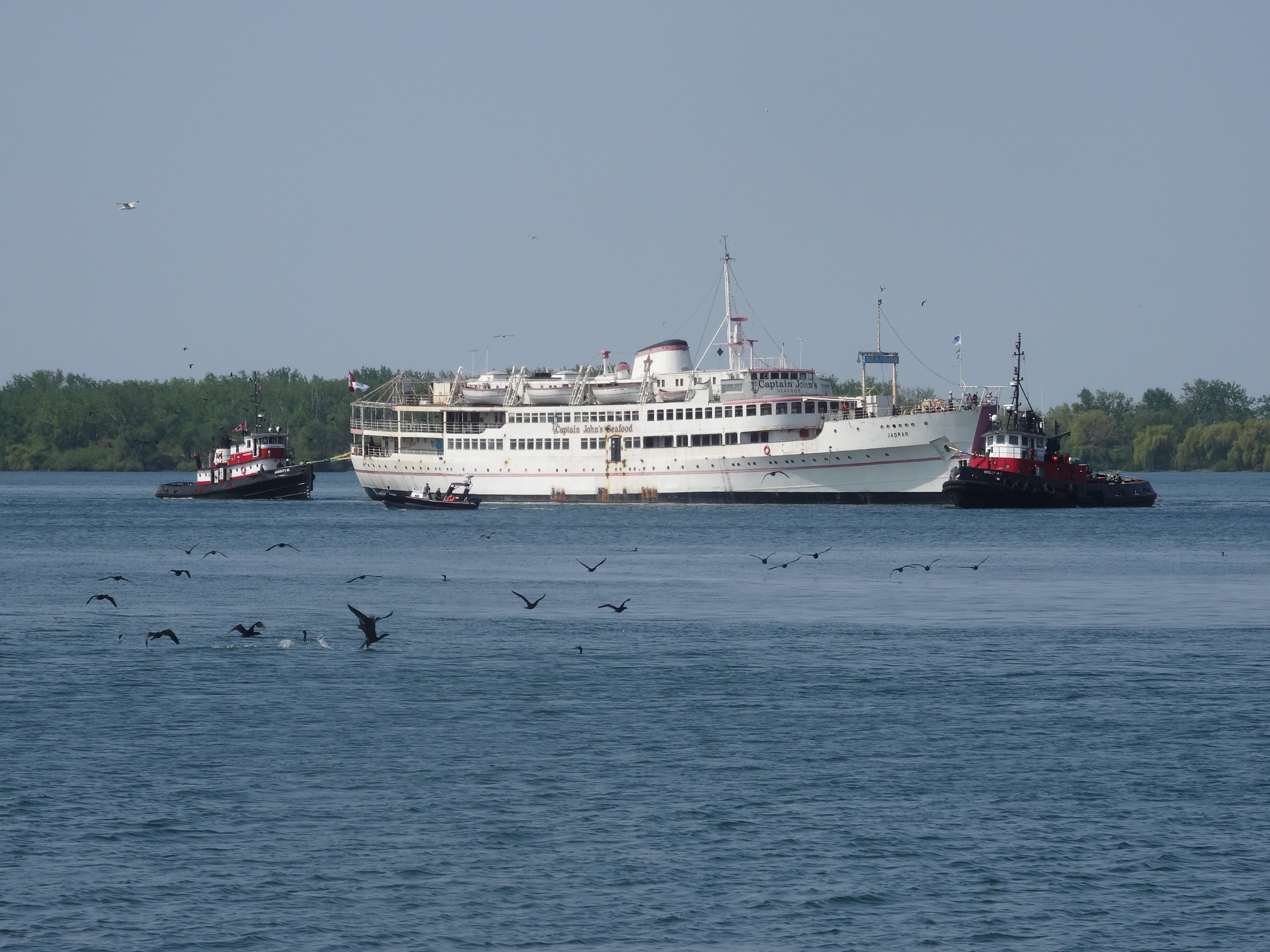
The MS Jadran on its last voyage, being towed out of Toronto on May 28, 2015, by tugboats.

The Toronto Port Authority gave an August 22, 2014, deadline for the Jadran to be removed and scrapped and took bids from ship breakers for the job. The Federal Court declared the bid of entrepreneur James Sbrolla of the North American Seafood Exchange in the amount of $33,501 to be successful. Sbrolla hoped to restore the Jadran to a floating restaurant; however, the removal of the ship was delayed due to problems in having the hydro transformer removed, and plans to find a new berth for the ship fell through. Sbrolla then proposed to have tugboats tow the ship out of harbour and move it to a private slip at the foot of Parliament Street where the ship would be stripped of salvageable elements with the remainder of the ship to be scrapped. However, the Toronto Port Authority terminated the deal and returned Sbrolla's payment after rejecting his proposal as it would have required tearing the ship apart in harbour, a plan which the authority did not "feel comfortable proceeding with".

==== Final voyage and scrapping ====
The Port Authority returned to court the following spring for approval to seek a new buyer. On May 11, 2015, the Federal Court approved plans to have the Marine Recycling Corporation take ownership of the vessel and tow it to its facility at Port Colborne, Ontario by the end of the month to be scrapped. Due to a slump in world metal prices the value of the ship declined by an estimated $200,000 since the previous summer. As a result, the sale only consisted of the Port Authority, Waterfront Toronto and the condominium developer paying Marine Recycling Corporation to tow and scrap the ship for an undisclosed fee; however, the estimated cost of the operation is $400,000. On May 28, 2015, the vessel was towed out of Toronto's harbour. Its departure was witnessed by a crowd of several hundred people and an impromptu band who had gathered for the occasion and was broadcast live on CP24.

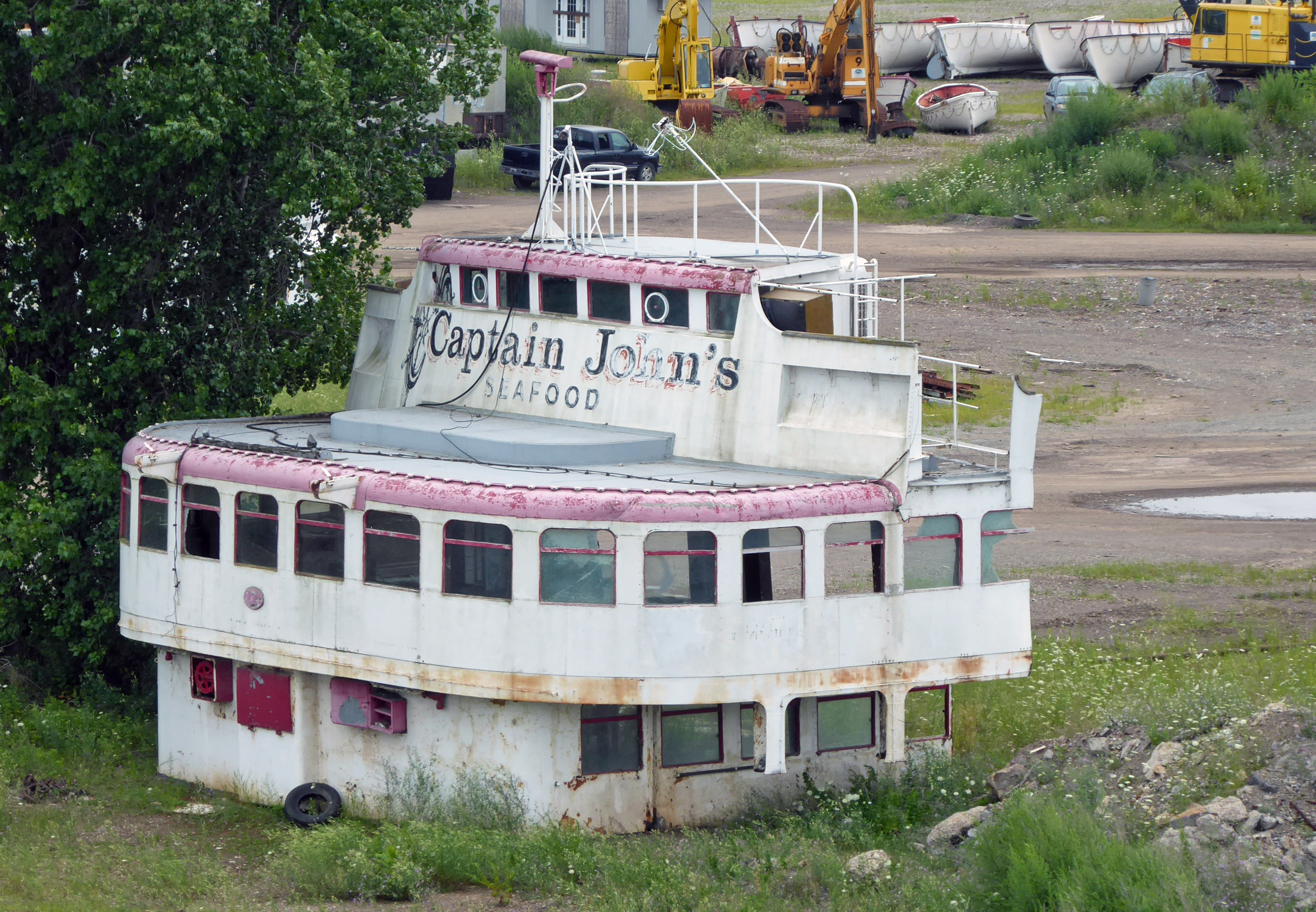
Remaining part of the superstructure 2018 in Port Colborne

The ship was towed across Lake Ontario and through the Welland Canal to Port Colborne, where Marine Recycling Corporation has its scrapyard, in a journey that began at 10:30 am and concluded at 2:15 the following morning. Letnik was invited to travel aboard the ship for its entire final voyage, as a paid consultant, and stood on the ship's deck, waving to the crowd assembled on the dock, as the ship was towed out of its slip. Prior to the ship's departure, Letnik was thanked by Harbourmaster Angus Armstrong and Councillor Norm Kelly for his contribution to the city in creating the waterfront's first attraction at a time when it was an industrial area neglected by tourists and residents alike. Letnik was given a framed photograph of himself, in captain's uniform, in front of the ship in the 1970s and thanked for "a mission well-served and not soon forgotten." The day before the ship sailed, Letnik received a reminder from the city that he still owed $814,656.12 in back property taxes.

== Legacy ==
A port-hole and piece of steel of the MS Jadran were used in a memorial monument to British Home Children who perished in Canada. The monument is located at a mass grave in Park Lawn Cemetery in Toronto.

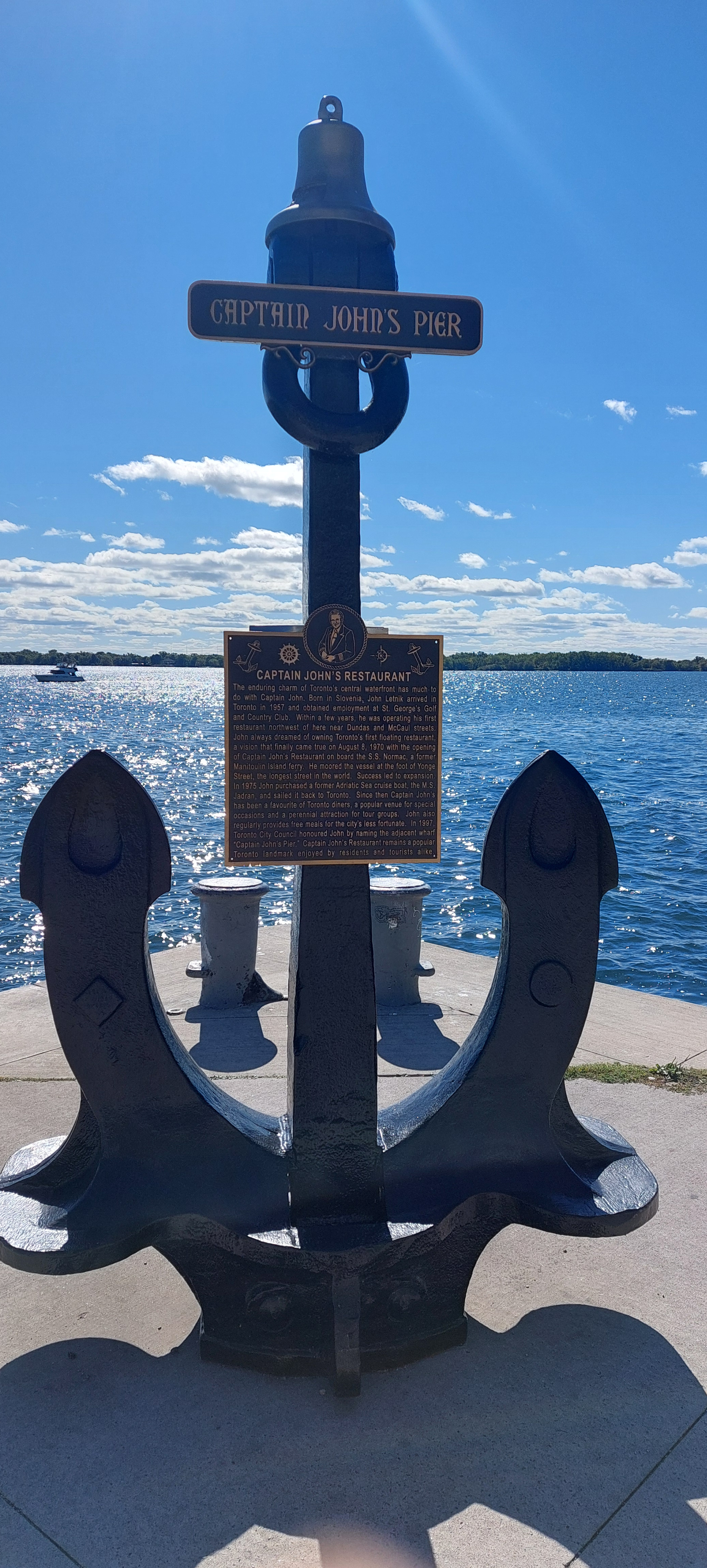
Monument at Toronto Harbour for Captain John's Restaurant

In 2018, a monument commemorating Captain John's was unveiled at the foot of Yonge Street made up of the MS Jadran's ship's bell and 3-metre (9.8 ft), 2,495-kilogram (5,501 lb) anchor.
