= Charles Battershill =

Canadian academic and politician

Charles Battershill, (born June 17, 1956) was briefly the nominated Green Party of Canada candidate for the Toronto--Danforth federal electoral riding. He stepped down not long after his nomination for personal reasons. Battershill has lived in the Toronto—Danforth riding for five years.

== Education and work history ==
Battershill received a Bachelor of Arts (Hons) from the University of Calgary in 1980, a Master of Arts from York University in 1983 and a PhD, again from York University, in 1989.

Battershill is a professor of social science at York University, where he teaches on such topics as global capitalism, technology and civilization, and the Industrial Revolution. He received his Ph.D. in 1989, and taught until 1994. Then he spent the next seven years in the securities industry in Toronto, working in finance and investment. For the next three years he worked with start up companies in health care and internet marketing. He returned to teaching in 2003.

== Union involvement ==
At York University, Battershill is a member and All University Pensions Committee Representative of the Political Action and Research Committee of the Canadian Union of Public Employees.

== Political involvement ==
The 40th Canadian federal election would have been Battershill's first time running for public office. While a Green Party candidate, Battershill was a proponent of a tax shift involving carbon tax. He advocates for the use of public transport, and opposes the development of the Portlands Energy Centre.
