= TransformTO =

Climate action plan for the City of Toronto

TransformTO is a plan adopted by the City of Toronto to bring the city to carbon neutrality by 2040. The plan was adopted by city council unanimously in July 2017, initially proposed in response to the 2016 Paris Agreement, aiming to reach net-zero carbon emissions by 2050. The timeline was accelerated following the council's 2019 declaration of a climate emergency by city council. The plan has four sub-strategies, addressing buildings, transportation, waste, and natural systems.

While the main goal of the TransformTO is to reach net-zero carbon emissions, it also aims to achieve co-benefits that positively impact the lives of Torontonians. Thus, the plan targets social equity, public health, protections for low-income groups, and local economy enhancements.

== History ==
Consultations for the plan started in 2015, as the Paris negotiations were underway. It precedes the federal government's 2020 net-zero emissions accountability act, which made the target of carbon neutrality by 2050 legally binding. The consultation was initiated with leadership from City Council, and was done as a collaboration between the city's environment and energy division and The Atmospheric Fund, with input from 10 other divisions and 20 community representatives, including indigenous groups.

The plan originally aimed to reduce carbon emissions by 80% by 2050. In December 2021, propelled by councillor Mike Layton, the city set a new timeline for reaching net-zero by 2040, 10 years earlier than the national goal.

The Toronto & York Region Labour Council endorsed the plan.

== Strategy ==
The plan includes four component strategies, covering buildings, transportation, waste, and natural systems. The 2026-2030 five year plan includes five steps to reaching net zero, including increasing access to low-carbon transport and limiting emissions associated with waste and wastewater.

== Governance ==
In May 2022, the Toronto City Council endorsed a city-created "Accountability and Management Framework" that is meant to guide long term implementation of the strategy. The framework aligns with the C40 climate action planning framework. It calls for the creation of three groups:

- A Climate Advisory Group (CAG) guides the development and implementation of the TransformTO strategy. The CAG is composed of 20 members representing community groups, industry groups, energy companies, and civil society. CAG members apply to be nominated, and meet four times a year.
- A Joint TransformTO Implementation Committee coordinates between city staff and unions to reach the net zero goal.
- A Net Zero Climate Leadership Table coordinates between senior city management staff across city divisions.

== Implementation ==
Under its buildings sub-strategy, the City of Toronto offers energy retrofit loans finance capital improvements that reduce energy demands of buildings. Within the transportation sector, the ferries connecting the city to Toronto Islands are planned to be converted to electric power. The Toronto Parking Authority has initiated a program for electric vehicle charging stations in city-operated parking lots.

Community groups have also taken up climate action under the plan's umbrella, including groups encouraging cycling as a form of soft mobility. Danforth-area residents are leading an effort to retrofit their homes to reduce their carbon emissions.

Despite considerable progress up to 2022, the city is not projected to reach its 2030 goals, making it unlikely to reach net zero by 2040.

The Toronto Green Standard (TGS) is a sustainable design standard for all new private and city-owned buildings in the city. It is one of the cornerstones of the TransformTO strategy.

== Controversies ==
In late 2022, the Ontario government passed Bill 23, titled More Homes Built Faster Act. The bill includes building code provisions that override the Toronto Green Standard, the provisions were later repealed.

In mid 2023, the provincial government gave permission to the Port Lands plant to increase its production capacity from natural gas, thus increasing the carbon emissions of Toronto and making it more difficult to meet TransformTO goals.

The 2024 bill by the Doug Ford conservative provincial government titled "Reducing Gridlock, Saving You Time Act" dictated the removal of existing bike lanes on three major streets in Toronto. A report by City staff stated that the removal of bike lanes would cost the city $48M, in addition to losing the $27M that were invested in building the infrastructure, and that it would hinder the efforts towards reaching the TransformTO plans. City Council voted in support of a motion to oppose the legislation, including through legal means.
