= Richard Hearn =

Richard Lankaster Hearn
- Born: May 18, 1890; Toronto, Ontario
- Died: May 24, 1987 (aged 97); Toronto, Ontario

Richard Lankaster Hearn (18 May 1890 – 24 May 1987) was a Canadian engineer who was one of the key players in the establishment of Ontario’s energy system.

== History ==
Born in Toronto, Ontario, he was among the group known as "Beck's bright boys". This group was responsible for the creation of the Hydro-Electric Power Commission of Ontario, the forerunner of Ontario Hydro and Ontario Power Generation. Hearn was instrumental in Ontario's decision to move towards nuclear generating stations. In 1956, he received the Sir John Kennedy Medal. In 1973, he was made an Officer of the Order of Canada "for his services as an administrator and consulting engineer in the development of vast power projects". Hearn was also responsible for the design and construction of many of Ontario's hydroelectric installations, including the first large hydroelectric project, the Queenston-Chippewa power development.

== Legacy ==
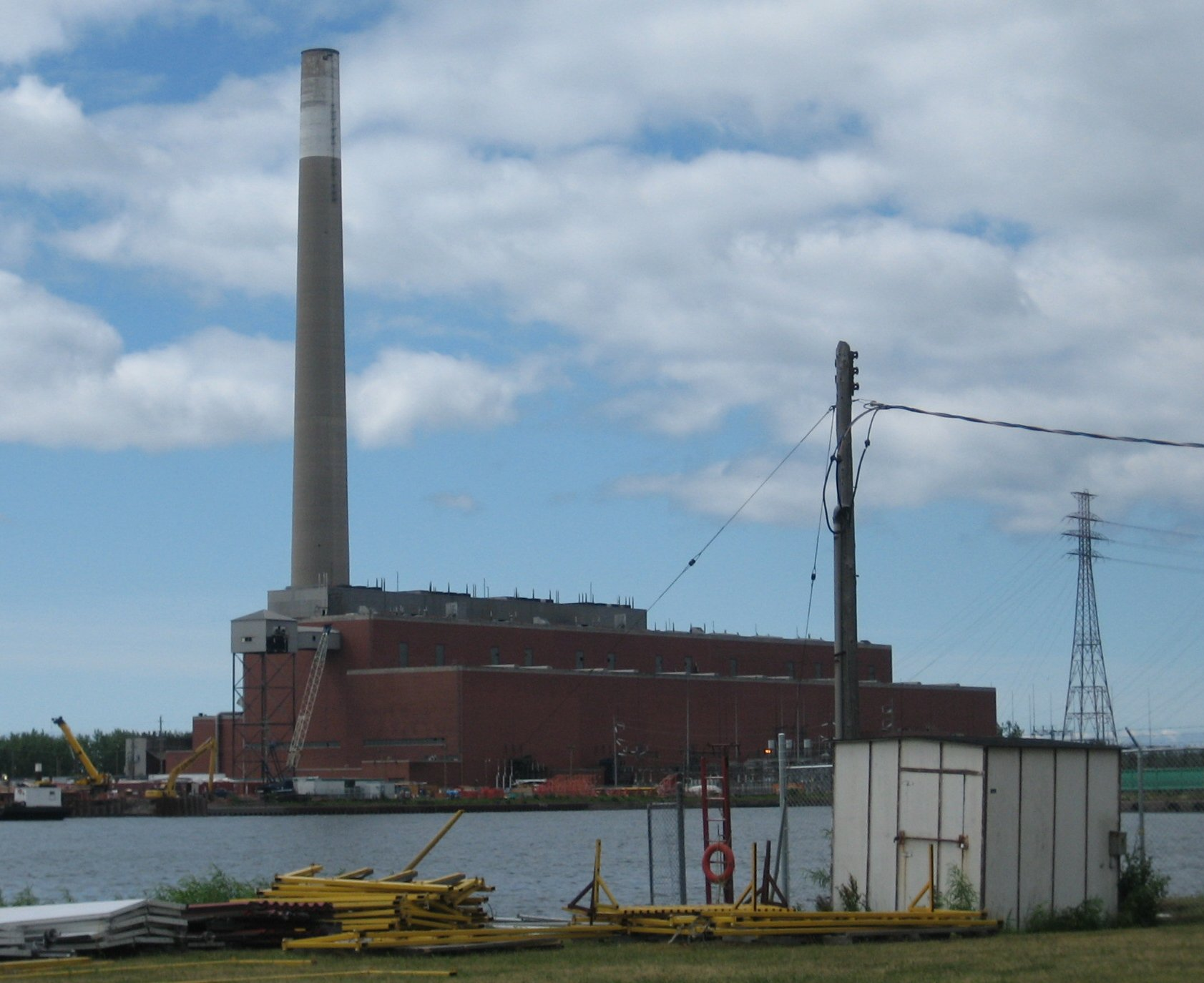
The Hearn Generating Station

Hearn died in May 1987 at the age of 97. The Hearn Generating Station, a decommissioned coal-fired and later natural gas-fired power station, located on the Toronto waterfront is named after him.
