= Toronto water taxi =

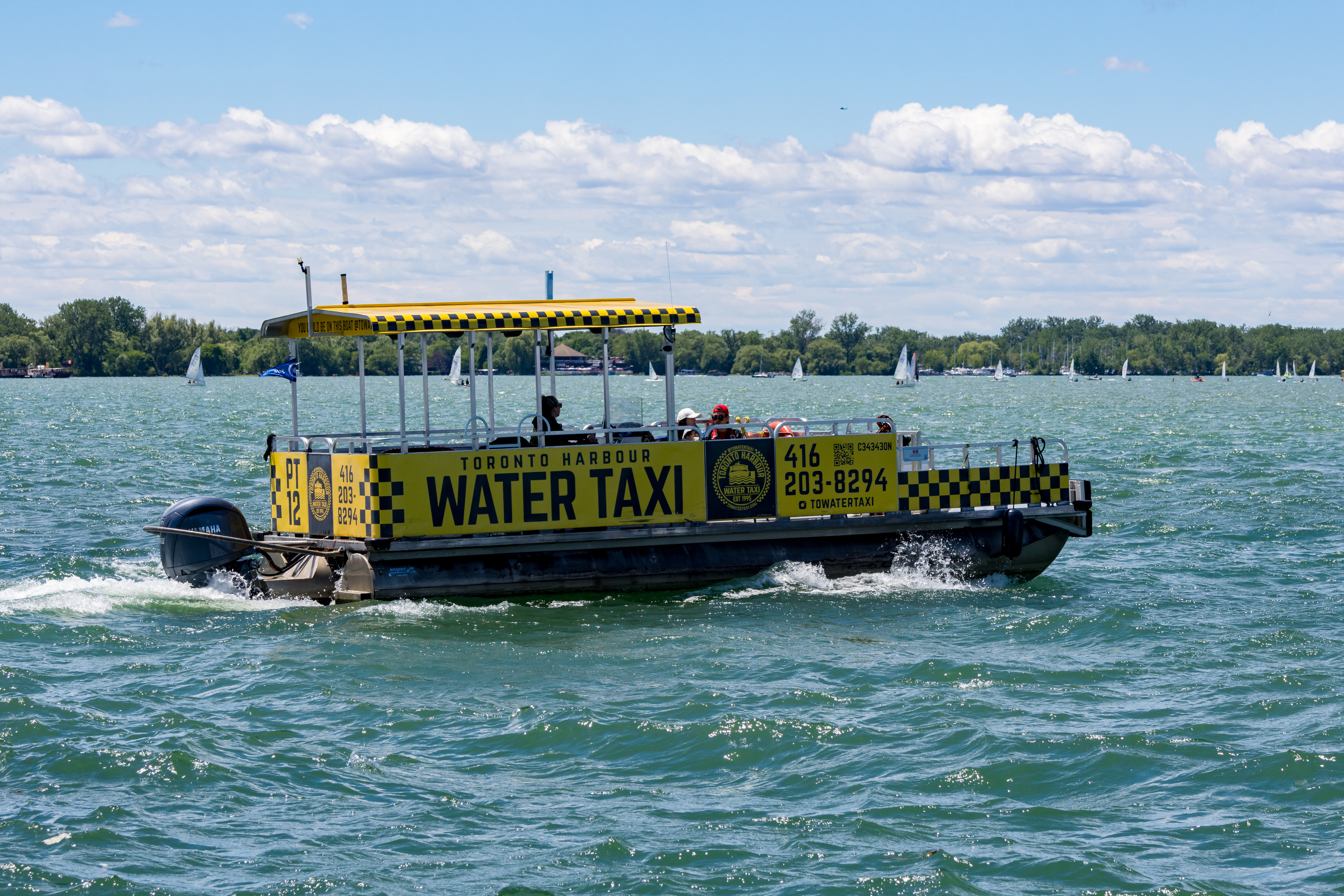
A Toronto Harbour Water Taxi departing from Ward's Island towards the city

Toronto water taxis and canoe taxis operate in the city of Toronto, Ontario, Canada as an alternate form of transportation to and from the Toronto Islands.

== Operations and restrictions ==
Unlike the city run ferry service, water taxis are privately run and cost more to cover the same distance. The taxis offer services to those who are stranded on the Islands when ferry service is disrupted or ended or to patrons who have missed boarding their cruise ships at various docks along the mainland. Inner taxis normally offer services within the inner harbour only.

== Toronto water taxi companies ==
There are currently six, privately owned, water taxi companies who are certified and licensed to operate in the Toronto Harbour.

- Tiki Taxi (Spadina & Queens Quay)
- Toronto Harbour Water Taxi (York Street / Harbourfront Centre)i
- Toronto Harbour Tours (York Street)
- The Otter Guy Water Taxi (now defunct) (Yonge Street)
- Water Taxi Now (Peter Street & Harbourfront Centre)
- Tdot Water Taxi (Yonge Street)

== Operators ==
Water taxis are licensed like land based taxis, and are also regulated by boating regulations. These regulations require the operator to be a licensed commercial motor boat operator (SVOP) and have required life jackets for all occupants. Operators are also required to have Marine First Aid, SDV-BS (formally known as MED A3) and a marine VHF operators license (ROC-M). All certifications are issued by Transport Canada, except for Industry Canada who issues the VHF radio license. All operator certifications are issued by federal bodies, unlike land taxis who receive certifications from provincial bodies (drivers licenses).

== Vessels ==
Taxi sizes vary from small boats carrying a few passengers to larger vessels carrying 10 or more passengers.

== See also ==
- Toronto Island ferries
