= Hearn Generating Station =

Decommissioned power station in Toronto, Canada

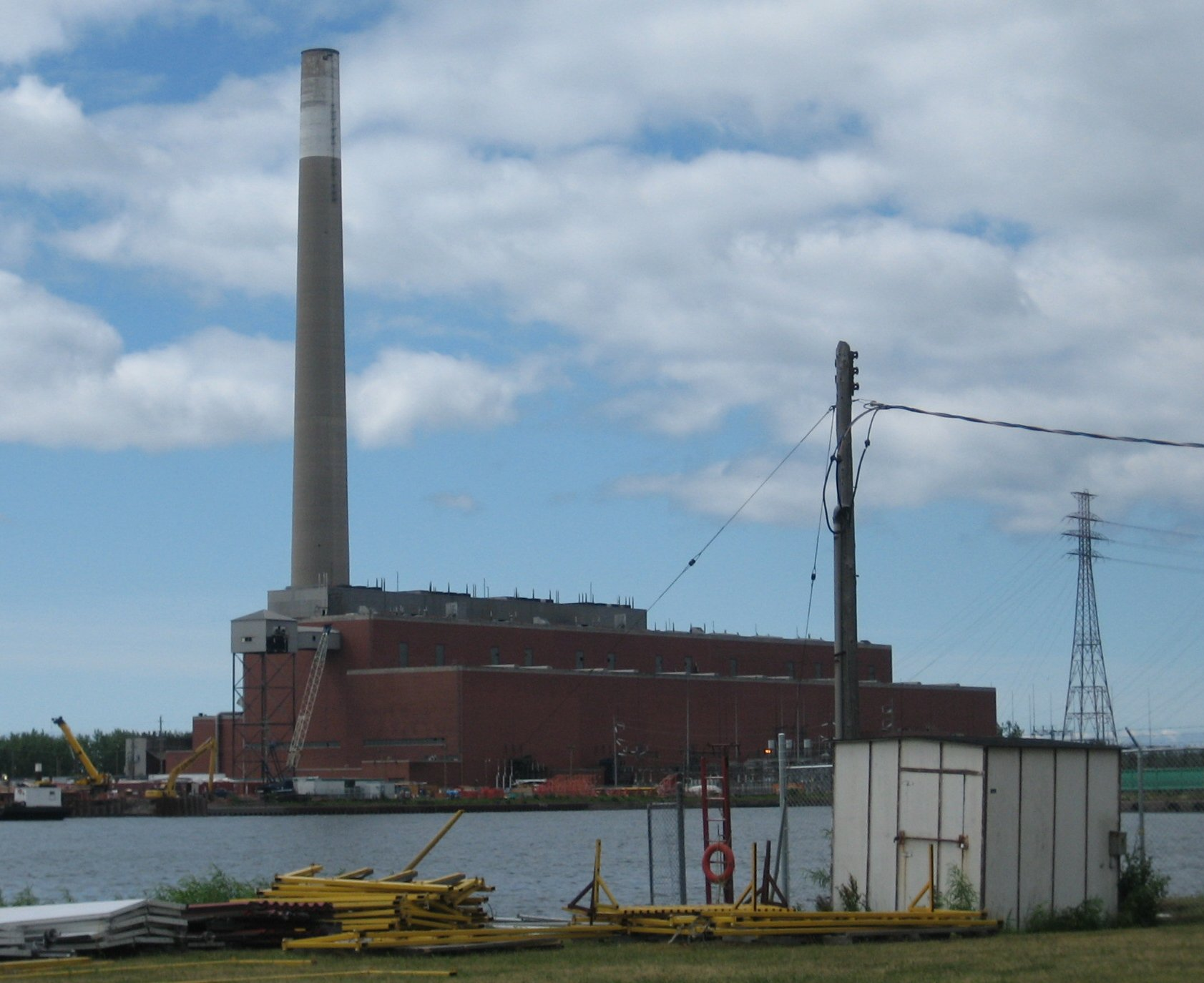
- The station's current appearance
- Country: Canada
- Location: Toronto, Ontario
- Coordinates: 43°38.730′N 79°20.105′W
- Status: Decommissioned
- Commission date: 1951
- Decommission date: 1983
- Owner: Studios of America

Thermal power station
- Primary fuel: Coal
- Turbine technology: Steam turbine

External links
- Commons: Related media on Commons

The Richard L. Hearn Generating Station (named after Richard Lankaster Hearn) is a decommissioned electrical generating station in Toronto, Ontario, Canada. The plant was originally fired by coal, but later converted to burn natural gas. The plant has been described as "Pharaonic in scale", and encompasses 650 thousand cubic metres of space—large enough to fit 12 Parthenons inside.

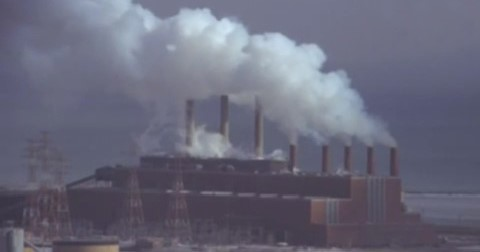
Hearn Generating Station operating circa 1960-70s prior to the construction of the superstack

The plant is located at 440 Unwin Avenue in Toronto's Port Lands area, directly south of the foot of Carlaw Avenue, across the shipping channel and next to the recently opened Portlands Energy Centre. The Richard L. Hearn Generating Station, together with the nearby Ashbridges Bay Wastewater Treatment Plant sewage sludge incinerator stack and the Commissioners Street waste incinerator stack, stand as towering landmarks of a bygone industrial era in the Portlands area of Toronto (all three facilities are no longer in operation, but their towering smokestacks still stand). The property was sold to Studios of America in 2018.

== History ==
The R. L. Hearn Generating Station was the site of Canada's first 100 MW steam turbo-generator set. The station sits in what was once Ashbridge's Bay, a shallow marsh that was filled in with rubble from downtown construction sites from 1911 to 1950s. The station was officially opened on October 26, 1951, by Leslie Frost, Premier of Ontario, with the first two units in service. Four units were in operation by 1953. The plant originally burned coal which was transported on ships through the Saint Lawrence Seaway. The station was designed by Stone & Webster. The turbine generators were built by Parsons in England and the boilers were made in Canada by Babcock & Wilcox (Cambridge, Ontario) and Combustion Engineering (Montreal, Quebec).

Construction on the station was not even finished in the 1950s when Hydro officials and the government began to talk about phasing out the plant with nuclear power and closing it. The early years were marked by difficult labour relations and several near strikes. Several unions were involved in conflicts with management and each other during the life of the station. The R. L. Hearn station was one of the founding locals of the Canadian Union of Operating Engineers and General Workers (CUOE Local 100) in 1960.

=== Operation as a coal-fired plant ===
The Richard L. Hearn plant reached full capacity of 1200 MW for the first time on March 22, 1961. At full load the boilers burned about 400 tonnes of coal per hour, and the turbines and other equipment required about 36 million gallons of cooling water from Lake Ontario per hour. Total construction cost was CA$156 million. The turbine hall was almost 300 metres long and was an impressive sight, viewed from the visitor gallery on the west side of the plant where the offices were located. Units 1–4 (100 MW) had one turbine-generator each. The 200 MW units (5–8) had two turbine-generators per unit—an arrangement called tandem cross-compound—so there were a total of 12 turbine-generator sets in the turbine hall. At the peak of the R. L. Hearn's operation in the 1960s the station employed up to 600 people. Many Ontario Hydro (later Ontario Power Generation) operators, maintainers, technicians and professionals began their careers, and were trained at the station and then went on to work at other plants and Ontario's CANDU nuclear stations.

The station at first had four smaller chimneys, one for each of the four boilers. The construction of the four 200 MW units added four more chimneys. The last three were a bit taller than the first five. The eight short chimneys were a source of air pollution in local neighborhoods and downtown Toronto and also fly ash and other particulates. The station contributed to Toronto's smog problem.

The eight chimneys were demolished and electrostatic precipitators were added for the 200 MW units when the large smokestack was built. The new single tall smokestack was built in response to pressure to reduce smog in Toronto by the emerging environmental movement in the late 1960s. It stands 215 metres tall and was one of the tallest in the world, costing $9 million when it was completed in 1971. Air pollution in Toronto from the station was greatly reduced and the area around the plant became known as a good fishing and recreation spot.

=== Conversion to natural gas ===
By the end of 1971, the entire plant was converted to burn natural gas with four units retaining the option to burn coal. In December 1972, Alberta Premier Peter Lougheed called the billion cubic metres of Alberta natural gas the station was burning annually "an appalling waste of natural gas" at the price of about $0.035 per cubic metre, and he charged that Ontario was getting a "cheap ride" at Alberta's expense.

Turbine hall of Hearn Generating Station, circa 1983

The station operated burning natural gas until 1983. Units 1–5 were mothballed between 1978 and 1979. Conversion to natural gas reduced pollution but increased operating costs and the plant's efficiency was much lower than today's combined cycle and cogeneration plants. The last three 200 MW units at the plant resumed burning coal along with natural gas but they were phased out of operation in July 1983, due to concerns about increased air pollution in Toronto and an abundant energy supply in the province. The staff level had been reduced to around 180 when power production stopped in 1983. Many of the workers took early retirement and others were transferred to other sites. Some of the generators were operated as synchronous condensers to improve power quality in Toronto and the electrical control room and switchyard continued to operate until 1995, with a staff of about 10.

In October 1985, Premier David Peterson's Liberal government proposed the re-opening the station using natural gas. It was only the first of numerous proposals to restart the plant, involving cogeneration, tri-generation, garbage incineration and eventually gas turbine combined cycle plants as new technologies were developed.

In June 1987, Ontario Progressive Conservative Party (PC) energy critic Philip Andrewes pushed the governing Liberal government to have the Hearn re-opened as a "non-polluting" natural gas power plant. (Note: Andrewes also alleged that the government's alternative proposal would be "more expensive and environmentally harmful" than restarting electricity production at the Hearn plant.) In October 1988, PC member of provincial parliament Donald Cousens called for the addition of scrubbers to the Hearn and proposed to return the station to service.

On March 16, 1990, Ontario Hydro announced the restart of two units (7 & 8) to meet demand for the winter of 1991. The restart had a projected cost of $69 million. Work on the restart was well underway when the new New Democratic Party government of Premier Bob Rae cancelled the project.

=== Redevelopment plans ===
The site was designated as protected for future electricity development by the Mike Harris- and Ernie Eves-led Ontario Progressive Conservative Party. This was also done with all other existing publicly owned electrical generating stations during the deregulation of the Ontario electrical power system. The plant had all of the asbestos insulation removed and site remediation work was done in the 1990s. Former premier Mike Harris later mentioned his plans to build the Portlands Energy Centre on the site of the Hearn, but the actual plant, opened in 2008 sits next to Hearn.

In 2002, Ontario Power Generation announced that Studios of America and Comweb Group (headed by Paul Bronfman) would be leasing the property of the former generating station and had plans to construct a 28 thousand square metre multipurpose film production studio called Great Lakes Studios on the site. Most of the boilers and a large amount of other equipment were removed and sent to the scrapyard. This movie studio project was abandoned in 2006. Although the station did not become a movie studio, the R. L. Hearn interior and grounds were used in a number of movie productions over the years. As of 2010, Studios of America still has long-term lease obligations for the Hearn site (32.5 years, according to the City of Toronto's Waterfront Secretariat, or 20 years, according to Studios of America). Subsequent reports indicated that the lease-holders are Paul Vaughan of Studios America and real estate developer Mario Cortellucci, with no reference to Comweb Group.

The Ontario government announced in April 2005 that the Portlands Energy Centre would not be part of the approved 2500 MW of new power production in Ontario coming online in the next few years. The Independent Electricity System Operator warned of rolling black-outs in Toronto if 250 MW are not added by 2008, with an additional 250 MW required by 2010. However, in February 2006 this decision was reversed, a new plan emerged proposing a new plant be built next to the Hearn site. Toronto mayor David Miller lobbied to have Hearn restored in some capacity to provide that power rather than build a second plant, while nearby residents opposed any kind of power generation plant in the area.

A proposal was made by Enwave (the former Toronto District Heating Corporation) and Constellation Energy to install advanced gas turbines and cogeneration inside the station and restore the station's control rooms, turbine hall and building exterior as a historical, filmmaking and education centre. The Minister of Energy, Donna Cansfield rejected the proposal.

On September 18, 2006, an agreement was signed between the Provincial government, Ontario Power Generation and TransCanada Corp. to construct a gas-fired plant next to Hearn. The Portlands plant may eventually be co-generation, however it is being built as a combined cycle plant due to inability to negotiate contracts for cogeneration energy sales. The Portlands Energy Centre opened in June 2008 with simple cycle production and combined cycle operation scheduled for mid-2009. Extensive demolition of previously preserved areas of the station including the turbine hall began once Studios of America abandoned their plans for a film studio.

In 2006, proposal to build a $600 million transmission corridor from the Portlands plant to connect with higher voltage transmission lines north of Toronto was being discussed and opposed by resident and other groups. The transmission system that the R.L Hearn station supplied was a 115 kV network of buried and overhead lines and transformer stations in Toronto. The city has been supplied by stepdown transformer stations from the east and west since the R. L. Hearn closed, which are becoming overloaded, especially in the summer.

On June 21, 2010, architecture firm Behnisch Architekten presented a proposal for converting the Hearn site into a three-pad arena. This plan did not proceed. The facility remains in the hands of the lease-holders with options that include extensions lasting until 2041. The property is not suitable for residential development because it is too close to the Portlands natural gas generating plant.

=== Other uses ===
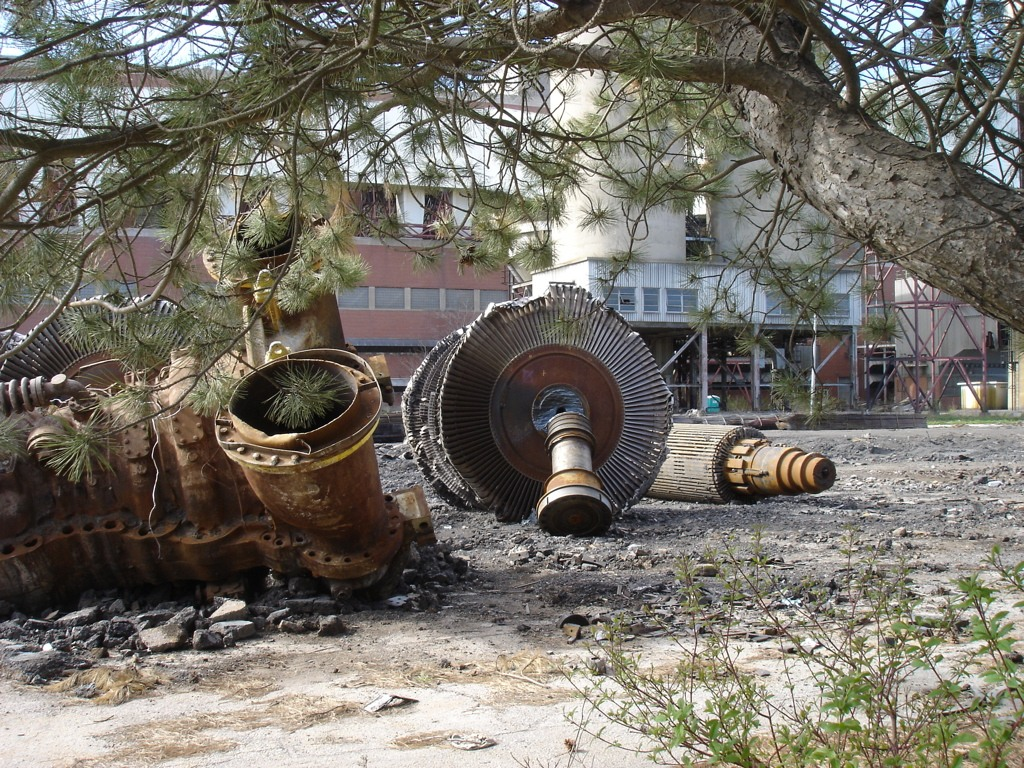
Turbomachinery removed from the station and left to rust in 2007. On the left is a turbine casing (high-pressure and intermediate-pressure?), a section of turbine (double-flow low-pressure) behind it in the middle, and to the right is a rotor (a.k.a. field) from one of the generators. Some indication of the power generated by the turbines can be seen in the size of the power shaft.

The nearly abandoned plant attracted photographers and urban explorers who published their work on websites and in photography exhibits in recent years. On June 15, 2008, Ryan Nyenhuis, an urban explorer trespassing in the plant fell three storeys into a coal chute, and was trapped for three hours when he became pinned under a steel plate. He suffered serious injuries and died two days later in hospital.

During the 1990s the Hearn Generating Station was used as a filming location in many Canadian television productions, including Goosebumps (it served as the Dark Falls Chemical Factory on the Season 2 episode Welcome to Dead House), Once a Thief and Animorphs. It was usually used to substitute as an industrial factory because of its basic industrial appearance and its iconic tall smokestack. This trend decreased in the early 2000s but the generating station still appears on TV from time to time, including in 12 Monkeys from 2015 to 2018 as Raritan Valley National Laboratory, the home of a time machine in a post apocalyptic world. In 2010, the station was used as the backdrop for the climactic scene of the movie RED, other scenes of which were shot in the Toronto area. In 2018, the station was also used for a location shoot for the Star Trek: Discovery episode "Brother". Additionally, it was used as a film location for Shazam!. Furthermore, the station was also used as a filming location for Disney Channel original films (DCOM) Zombies 2, known formally in the Disney trilogy as Seabrook Power and is where the musical number 'Flesh & Bone' takes place.

On June 5, 2014, the building was used for the Toronto Luminato Festival Big Bang Bash, their 2nd annual fundraising gala. It also featured the Yves Saint Laurent Opening Night Party later that evening. In 2015 the building was used for UNSOUND hosted by Luminato Festival. In 2016 Luminato Festival used the building for its festival hub where Sunn O))) performed for the first time.

== See also ==
- Lakeview Generating Station
- Nanticoke Generating Station
- Portlands Energy Centre
- Toronto Port Authority – Federal Government agency responsible
  for port operations
- Toronto waterfront
