= Metro Toronto Parks and Culture =

Metro Toronto Parks and Culture was a department within the former regional municipality of Metropolitan Toronto.

The department was responsible for maintaining major parks and cultural sites around Metro Toronto, Ontario, Canada.

Parks – now under Toronto Parks and Recreation

- Morningside Park
- Glen Rouge Park and stables
- Humber Bay Park
- Colonel Samuel Smith Park
- Sunnybrook Park and stables
- Toronto Islands and the Toronto Island ferries
- Bluffers Park
- Colonel Danforth Park
- Lower Don Parkland / Don Valley Brickworks
- Marie Curtis Park

Culture

- O'Keefe Centre – now the Sony Centre for the Performing Arts
- Metro Toronto Zoo – now Toronto Zoo
- Black Creek Pioneer Village
- Toronto Heritage
- Exhibition Place – park used by the Canadian National Exhibition or "The Ex"
- Museums other than the Royal Ontario Museum, Bata Shoe Museum

== Post-amalgamation ==
After 1997 these services under this department is now under Toronto Parks and Recreation.
