= Portlands Energy Centre =

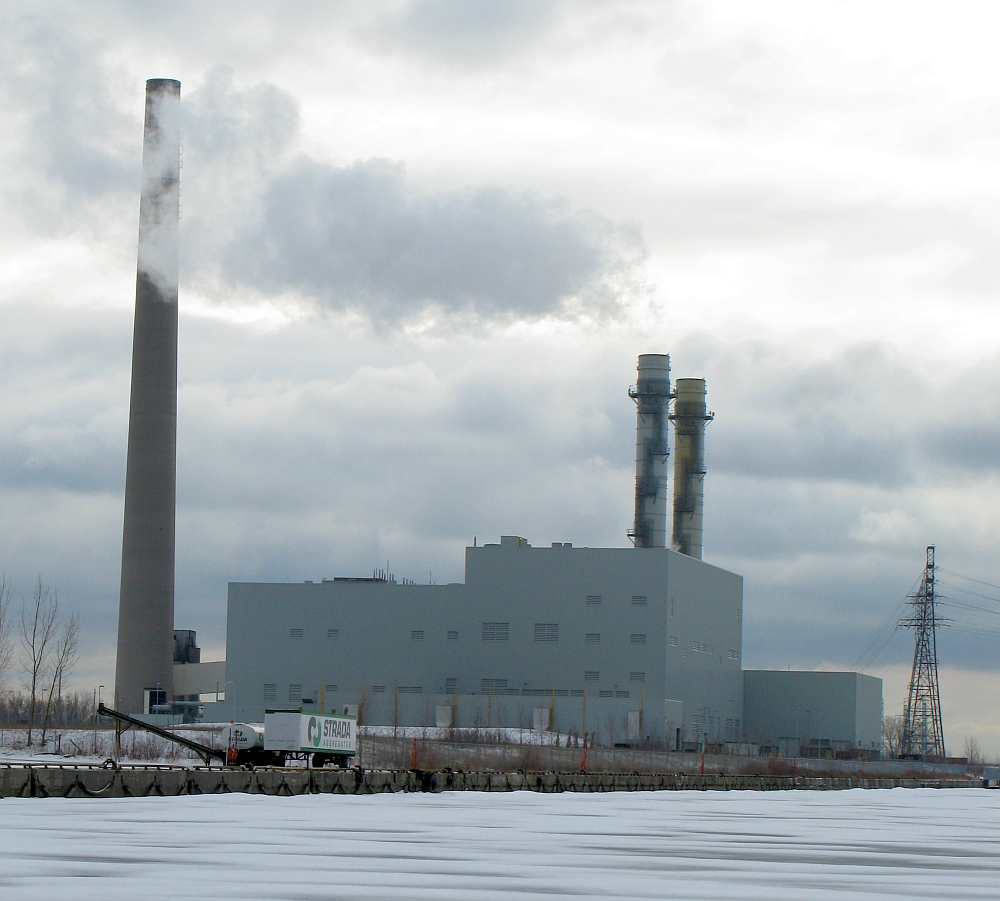
- Country: Canada
- Location: 470 Unwin Ave; Toronto, Ontario
- Coordinates: 43°38′58″N 79°19′51″W
- Status: Operational
- Commission date: 2008
- Construction cost: $730 million CAD
- Owner: Atura Power (Ontario Power Generation)
- Operator: Atura Power
- Employees: 30

Thermal power station
- Primary fuel: Natural gas
- Cooling source: Lake Ontario
- Combined cycle?: Yes

Power generation
- Units operational: 2 × 181 MW GE 7FA gas turbines 2 × Alstom fired HRSG; 1 × 290 MW Alstom steam turbine
- Nameplate capacity: 550 megawatts

External links
- Website: portlandsenergycentre.com
- Commons: Related media on Commons

The Portlands Energy Centre is a 550-megawatt natural gas electrical generating station in Toronto, Ontario. It is located in the Port Lands area of the Toronto waterfront at 470 Unwin Avenue, adjacent to the site of the decommissioned Hearn Generating Station.

== Ownership ==
The Portlands Energy Centre was originally owned and operated as a 50/50 joint partnership between Ontario Power Generation (OPG) and TransCanada Corporation (now TC Energy). OPG acquired full ownership of the facility in 2020, and it is currently operated by OPG's subsidiary Atura Power.

== Technical specifications of the plant ==
The technical specifications of the plant in the original submission of the environmental review report (a less rigorous form of a full environmental assessment) to the Ministry of the Environment in November 2003 have been significantly altered. This was due to the government instructing Ontario Power Generation to stop participating in projects that use more environmentally acceptable generation systems, such as co-generation. Originally, the plant was described as consisting of two identical 275 MW powertrain systems, with each system comprising a 175 MW GE 7FA gas turbine generator and other equipment. This proposed configuration was capable of producing over 272,000 per hour of steam for district heating.

== Power purchase agreement, timing and capital costs ==
On September 18, 2006, TransCanada issued a press release announcing that Portlands Energy Centre L.P. had signed a 20-year Accelerated Clean Energy Supply (ACES) contract with the Ontario Power Authority for the power output of the PEC.

The plant started delivering 340 MW of power to the City of Toronto in June 2008 in single-cycle operation and was fully operational with an output of 550 MW by the second quarter of 2009. Total capital costs are expected to reach $730MM.

== See also ==
- Toronto waterfront
- Port Lands
- Toronto Hydro - City owned electricity distribution corporation
- Ontario Power Generation - Provincially owned electricity generation corporation
- Hearn Generating Station - The original electrical generation facility
- Toronto Port Authority - Federal government agency that controls the portlands
