= LinkNYC =

Internet service provider in New York City

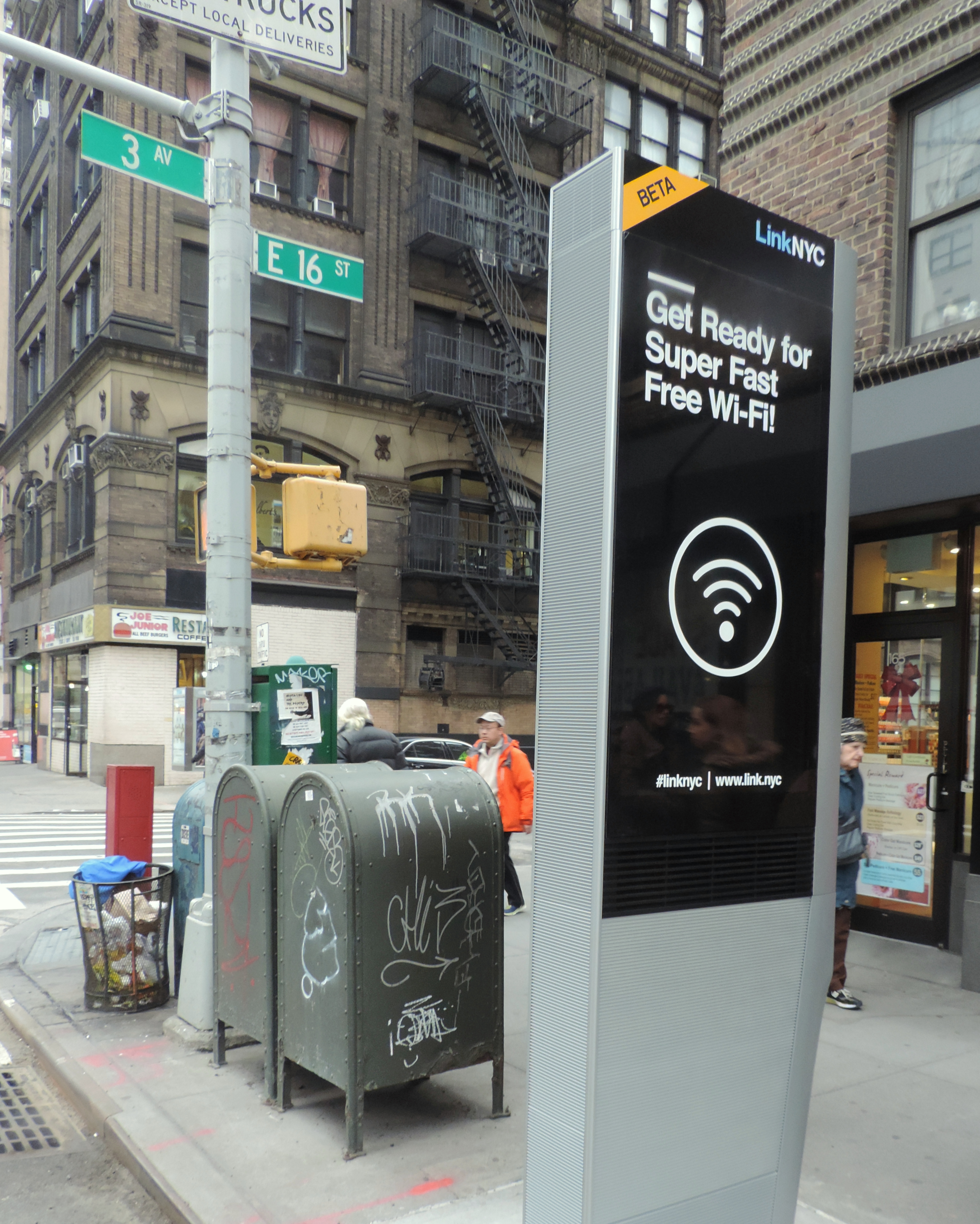
- A Link at Third Avenue and 16th Street in Manhattan
- Founded: November 7, 2014; 12 years ago
- Headquarters: New York City, New York, U.S.
- Area served: New York metropolitan area
- Brands: LinkNYC
- Services: Wireless communication
- Owner: Intersection (CityBridge consortium); Qualcomm; CIVIQ Smartscapes
- Website: link.nyc

LinkNYC is an infrastructure project providing free Wi-Fi service in New York City. The office of New York City Mayor Bill de Blasio announced the plan on November 17, 2014, and the installation of the first kiosks, or "Links," started in late 2015. The Links replace the city's network of 9,000 to 13,000 payphones, a contract for which expired in October 2014. The LinkNYC kiosks were devised after the government of New York City held several competitions to replace the payphone system. The most recent competition, in 2014, resulted in the contract being awarded to the CityBridge consortium, which comprises Qualcomm; Titan and Control Group, which now make up Intersection; and Comark.

All of the 9.5-foot-tall (2.9 m) Links feature two 55-inch (140 cm) high-definition displays on their sides; Android tablet computers for accessing city maps, directions, and services, and making video calls; two free USB charging stations for smartphones; and a phone allowing free calls to all 50 states and Washington, D.C. The Links also provide the ability to use calling cards to make international calls, and each Link has one button to call 9-1-1 directly. CityBridge has also installed 32-foot-tall (9.8 m) poles under the Link5G brand, which provide both Wi-Fi and 5G service.

The project brings free, encrypted, gigabit wireless internet coverage to the five boroughs by converting old payphones into Wi-Fi hotspots where free phone calls could also be made. As of 2020, there are 1,869 Links citywide; eventually, 7,500 Links are planned to be installed in the New York metropolitan area, making the system the world's fastest and most expansive. Intersection has also installed InLinks in cities across the UK. The Links are seen as a model for future city builds as part of smart city data pools and infrastructure.

Since the Links' deployment, there have been several concerns about the kiosks' features. Privacy advocates have stated that the data of LinkNYC users can be collected and used to track users' movements throughout the city. There are also concerns with cybercriminals possibly hijacking the Links, or renaming their personal wireless networks to the same name as LinkNYC's network, in order to steal LinkNYC users' data. Until 2016, the tablets of the Links could be used to browse the Internet, but they were disabled due to concerns arose about the Link tablets' browsers being used for illicit purposes. The Link5G poles were installed starting in 2022.

== History ==
=== Payphones and plans for reuse ===
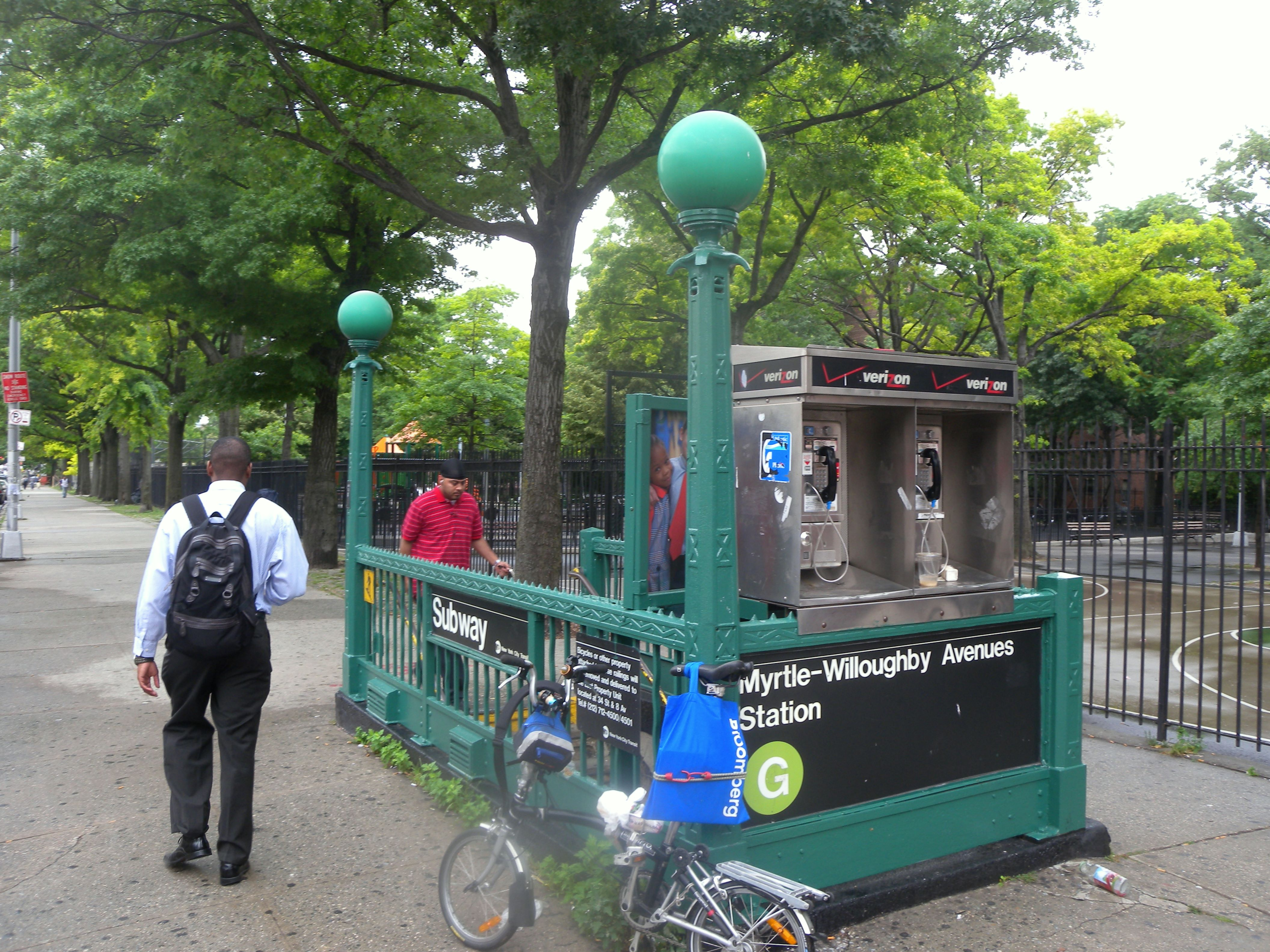
One of New York City's 9,000 to 13,000 dated payphones at the Myrtle–Willoughby Avenues subway station

In 1999, 13 companies signed a contract that legally obligated them to maintain New York City's payphones for 15 years. In 2000, the city's tens of thousands of payphones were among the 2.2 million payphones spread across the United States. Since then, these payphones' use had been declining with the advent of cellphones. As of July 2012, there were 13,000 phones in over 10,000 individual locations; that number had dropped to 9,133 phones in 7,302 locations by April 2014, at a time when the number of payphones in the United States had declined more than 75 percent, to 500,000. The contract with the 13 payphone operators was set to expire in October 2014, after which time the payphones' futures were unknown.

In July 2012, the New York City government released a public request for information, asking for comments about the future uses for these payphones. The RFI presented questions such as "What alternative communications amenities would fill a need?"; "If retained, should the current designs of sidewalk payphone enclosures be substantially revised?"; and "Should the current number of payphones on City sidewalks change, and if so, how?". Through the RFI, the New York City government sought new uses for the payphones, including a combination of "public wireless hotspots, touch-screen wayfinding panels, information kiosks, charging stations for mobile communications devices, [and] electronic community bulletin boards," all of which eventually became the features of the kiosks that were included in the LinkNYC proposal.

In 2013, a year before the payphone contract was set to expire, there was a competition that sought ideas to further repurpose the network of payphones. The competition, held by the administration of Michael Bloomberg, expanded the idea of the pilot project. There were 125 responses that suggested a Wi-Fi network, but none of these responses elaborated on how that would be accomplished.

=== Previous free Wi-Fi projects ===
In 2012, the government of New York City installed Wi-Fi routers at 10 payphones in the city (seven in Manhattan, two in Brooklyn, and one in Queens) as part of a pilot project. The Wi-Fi was free of charge and available for use at all times. The Wi-Fi signal was detectable from a radius of a few hundred feet (about 100m). Two of New York City's largest advertising companies—Van Wagner and Titan, who collectively owned more than 9,000 of New York City's 12,000 payphones at the time—paid $2,000 per router, with no monetary input from either the city or taxpayers. While the payphones participating in the Wi-Fi pilot project were poorly marked, the Wi-Fi offered at these payphones was significantly faster than some of the other free public Wi-Fi networks offered elsewhere.

The Manhattan neighborhood of Harlem received free Wi-Fi starting in late 2013. Routers were installed in three phases within a 95-block area between 110th Street, Frederick Douglass Boulevard, 138th Street, and Madison Avenue. Phase 1, from 110th to 120th Streets, finished in 2013; Phase 2, from 121st to 126th Street, was expected to be complete in February 2014; and Phase 3, the remaining area, was supposed to be finished by May 2014. The network was estimated to serve 80,000 Harlemites, including 13,000 in public housing projects who may have otherwise not had broadband internet access at home. At the time, it was dubbed the United States' most expansive "continuous free public Wi-Fi network."

=== Bids ===
A historical overview of entities involved in the LinkNYC project

On April 30, 2014, the New York City Department of Information Technology and Telecommunications (DOITT) requested proposals for how to convert the city's over 7,000 payphones into a citywide Wi-Fi network. A new competition was held, with the winner standing to receive a 12-year contract to maintain up to 10,000 communication points. The communication points would tentatively have free Wi-Fi service, advertising, and free calls to at least 9-1-1 (the emergency service) or 3-1-1 (the city information hotline).

The contract would require the operator, or the operating consortium, to pay "$17.5 million or 50 percent of gross revenues, whichever is greater" to the City of New York every year. The communication points could be up to 10 ft 3 in (3.12 m) tall, compared to the 7 ft 6 in (2.29 m) height of the phone booths; however, the advertising space on these points would only be allowed to accommodate up to 21.3 square feet (1.98 m^{2}) of advertisements, or roughly half the maximum of 41.6 square feet (3.86 m^{2}) of the advertising space allowed on existing phone booths. There would still need to be phone service at these Links because the payphones are still used often: collectively, all of New York City's nearly 12,000 payphones were used 27 million times in 2011, amounting to each phone being used about six times per day.

In November 2014, the bid was awarded to the consortium CityBridge, which consists of Qualcomm, Titan, Control Group, and Comark. In June 2015, Control Group and Titan announced that they would merge into one company called Intersection. Intersection is being led by a Sidewalk Labs-led group of investors who operate the company as a subsidiary of Alphabet Inc. that focuses on solving problems unique to urban environments. Daniel L. Doctoroff, the former CEO of Bloomberg L.P. and former New York City Deputy Mayor for Economic Development and Rebuilding, is the CEO of Sidewalk Labs.

=== Installation of kiosks ===
==== Initial kiosks ====
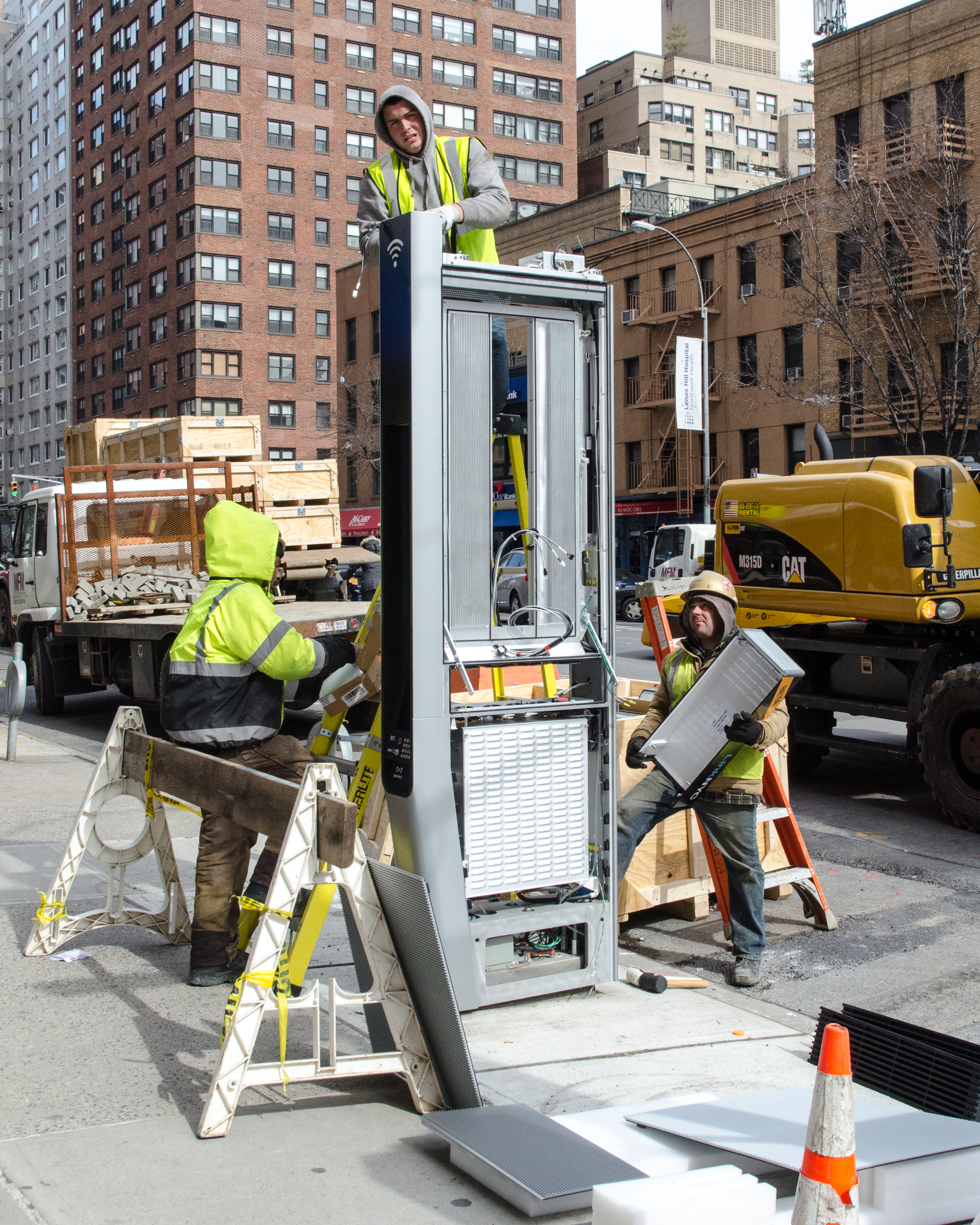
Link installation

CityBridge announced that it would be setting up about 7,000 kiosks, called "Links," near where guests could use the LinkNYC Wi-Fi. Coverage was set to be up by late 2015, starting with about 500 Links in areas that already have payphones, and later to other areas. These Links were to be placed online by the end of the year. The project would require the installation of 400 miles (640 km) of new communication cables. The Links would be built in coordination with borough presidents, business improvement districts, the New York City Council, and New York City community boards. The project was to create up to 800 jobs, including 100 to 150 full-time jobs at CityBridge as well as 650 technical support positions. Of the LinkNYC plans, New York City Mayor Bill de Blasio said,

With this proposal for the fastest and largest municipal Wi-Fi network in the world – accessible to and free for all New Yorkers and visitors alike – we're taking a critical step toward a more equal, open and connected city – for every New Yorker, in every borough.

In December 2014, the network was approved by New York City's Franchise and Concession Review Committee. Installation of two stations on Third Avenue—at 15th and 17th Streets—began on December 28, 2015, followed by other Links on Third Avenue below 58th Street, as well as on Eighth Avenue. After some delays, the first Links went online in January 2016. The public network was announced in February 2016. Locations like St. George, Jamaica, South Bronx, and Flatbush Avenue were prioritized for LinkNYC kiosk installations, with these places receiving Links by the end of 2016.

The vast majority of the payphones were to be demolished and replaced with Links. However, several payphones along West End Avenue on the Upper West Side were preserved rather than being replaced with Links. These payphones are the only remaining fully enclosed payphones in Manhattan. The preservation process includes creating new fully enclosed booths for the site, which is a difficulty because that specific model of phone booth is no longer manufactured. The New York City government and Intersection agreed to preserve these payphones because of their historical value, and because they were a relic of the Upper West Side community, having been featured in the 2002 movie Phone Booth and the 2010 book "The Lonely Phone Booth."

==== Expansion and issues ====
By mid-July 2016, the planned roll-out of 500 hubs throughout New York City was to occur, though the actual installation proceeded at a slower rate. As of September 2016, there were 400 hubs in three boroughs, most of which were in Manhattan, although there were at least 25 hubs in the Bronx and several additional hubs in Queens. In November 2016, the first two Links were installed in Brooklyn, with plans to install nine more Links in various places around Brooklyn before year's end. Around this time, Staten Island received its first Links, which were installed in New Dorp. The Links were being installed at an average pace of ten per day throughout the boroughs with a projected goal of 500 hubs by the end of 2016. By July 2017, there were 920 Links installed across the city. This number had increased to 1,250 by January 2018, and to 1,600 by September 2018.

As originally planned, there would be 4,550 hubs by July 2019 and 7,500 hubs by 2024, which would make LinkNYC the largest and fastest public, government-operated Wi-Fi network in the world. Slightly more than half, or 52 percent, of the hubs would be in Manhattan and the rest would be in the outer boroughs. There would be capacity for up to 10,000 Links within the network, as per the contract. The total cost for installation is estimated at more than $200 million. The eventual network includes 736 Links in the Bronx, 361 of which will have advertising and fast network speeds; as well as over 2,500 in Manhattan, most with advertising and fast network speeds. By December 2019, only 1,774 LinkNYC kiosks had been installed across the city; the kiosks were largely concentrated in wealthy neighborhoods Manhattan, although Harlem, the South Bronx, and Queens also had several kiosks.

CityBridge had installed 1,869 kiosks by May 2020. Most of the kiosks were in Manhattan. CityBridge had only provided three-fifths the number of kiosks that it had been expected to provide by that time. New York state comptroller Thomas DiNapoli released a report in 2021, finding that 86 of the city's 185 ZIP Codes had kiosks; Manhattan was the only borough that had LinkNYC kiosks in the vast majority of its ZIP Codes. By 2022, all of the city's public payphones had been replaced by Links, and the network had 425,000 monthly users.

=== Implementation of 5G poles ===
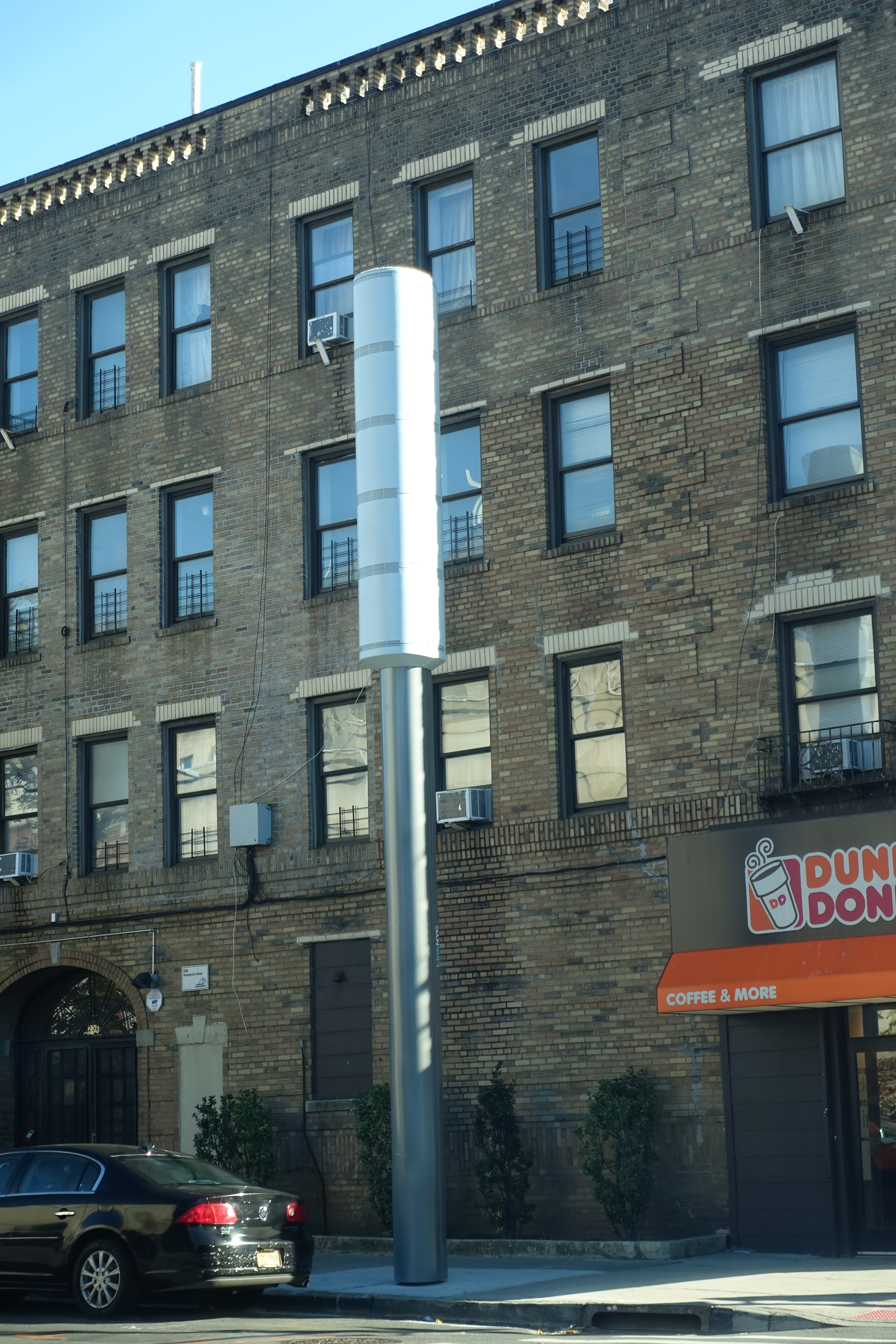
A Link5G pole in Brooklyn

In October 2021, CityBridge submitted designs to the New York City Public Design Commission for the installation of 32-foot-tall (9.8 m) poles, capable of transmitting 5G wireless signals, under the Link5G brand. The Public Design Commission initially only approved the construction of Link5G poles in commercial and industrial neighborhoods. The first such pole was installed at the intersection of Hunters Point Avenue and 30th Place in Long Island City, Queens, in March 2022 and was used for testing. As part of an agreement with the city government, over 2,000 poles were to be installed in portions of the city that lacked reliable internet service. Under the agreement with CityBridge, the city would receive eight percent of the first $200 million in profits from the Link5G project, as well as half of all revenue above $200 million. The first publicly accessible pole was installed in Morris Heights, Bronx, in July 2022. By the end of the year, CityBridge had installed 26 Link5G poles citywide.

A 2023 study conducted by LinkNYC found that, although nearly half of residents surveyed were unaware of the poles' existence, those who did were largely supportive of the program. Nonetheless, as additional poles were rolled out across the city in 2023, residents expressed concerns about the Link5G poles' appearance and height; some opponents also cited misinformation related to 5G technology. Neighborhoods such as the West Village and the Upper East Side opposed the Link5G poles. Conversely, city officials and businesses supported the installation of the poles. Following a letter from U.S. representative Jerrold Nadler, the Federal Communications Commission (FCC) ruled in April 2023 that the poles needed to undergo environmental and historic-preservation reviews. All but one of the planned 5G towers on the Upper East Side were canceled in 2024 because they violated historic-district guidelines. As of July 2024, there were 200 Link5G poles citywide, of which only two were transmitting 5G signals.

== Description ==
=== Links ===
The Links are 9.5 feet (2.9 m) tall, and are compliant with the Americans with Disabilities Act of 1990. There are two 55-inch (140 cm) high-definition displays on each Link for advertisements and public service announcements. There is an integrated Android tablet embedded within each Link, which can be used to access city maps, directions, and services, as well as make video calls; they were formerly also available to allow patrons to use the internet, but these browsers have now been disabled due to abuse (see below).

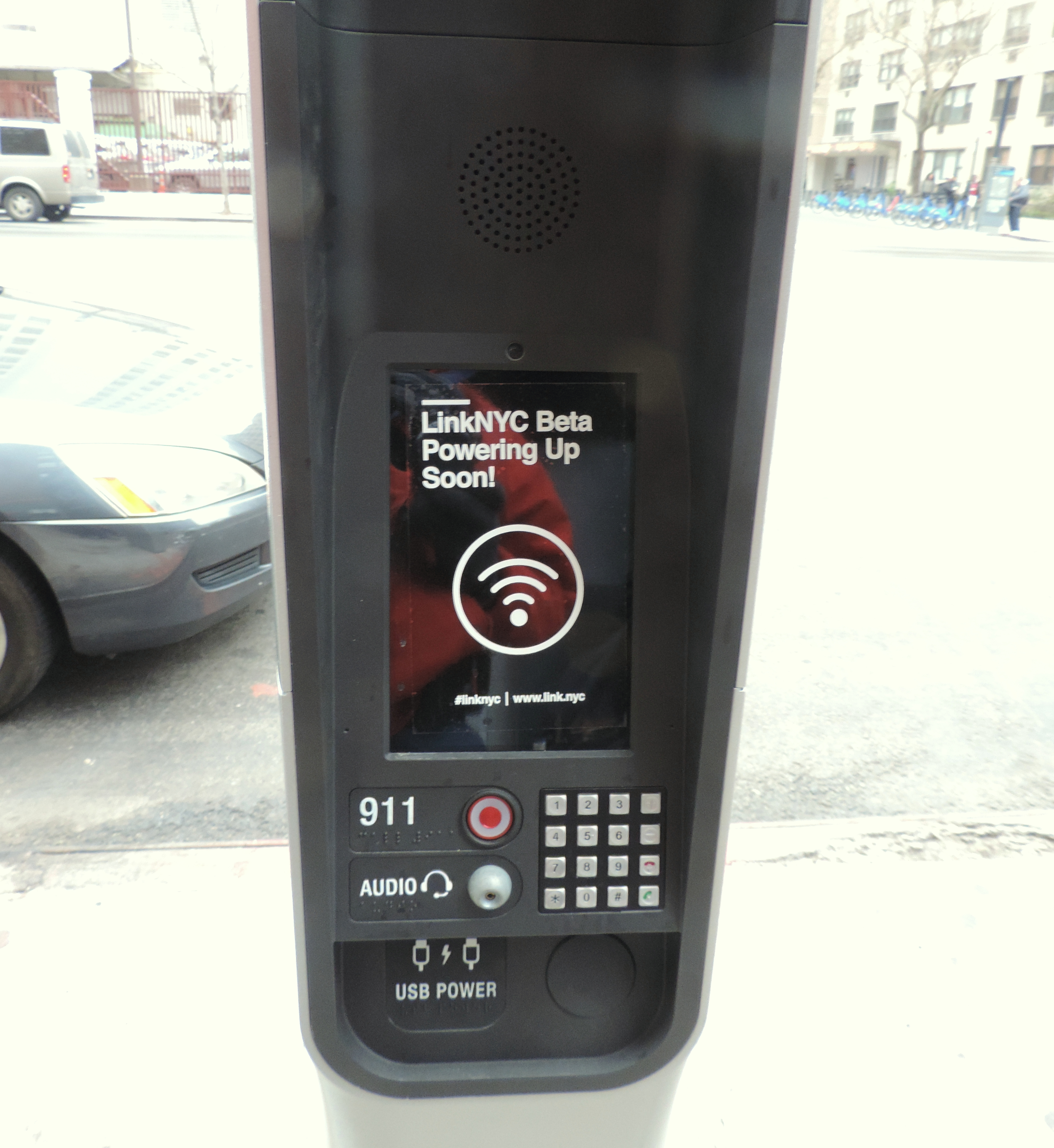
Tablet with keypad, 9-1-1 button, and headphone jack

Each Link includes two free USB charging stations for smartphones as well as a phone that allows free calls to all 50 states and to Washington, D.C. The Links allow people to make either phone calls (using the keypad and the headphone jack to the keypad's left), or video calls (using the tablet). Vonage provides this free domestic phone call service as well as the ability to make international calls using calling cards. The Links feature a red 9-1-1 call button between the tablet and the headphone jack, and they can be used to call the information helpline 3-1-1.

The Links can be used for completing simple time-specific tasks such as registering to vote. In April 2017, the Links were equipped with another app, Aunt Bertha, which could be utilized to find social services such as food pantries, financial aid, and emergency shelter. The Links sometimes offer eccentric apps, such as an app to call Santa's voice mail that was enabled in December 2017. In October 2019, a video relay service for deaf users was added to the Links.

The Wi-Fi technology comes from Ruckus Wireless and is enabled by Qualcomm's Vive 802.11ac Wave 2 4x4 chipsets. The Links' operating system runs on the Qualcomm Snapdragon 600 processor and the Adreno 320 graphics processing unit. The Links' hardware and software can handle future upgrades. The software will be updated until at least 2022, but Qualcomm has promised to maintain the Links for the rest of their service lives.

Each Link has cameras and over 30 vibration sensors to sense if the kiosk has been hit by an object. A separate set of sensors also detects if the USB ports are tampered with. The Links have a backup battery power supply that can last for up to 24 hours if a long-term power outage were to occur. This was added to prevent interruption of phone service, as happened in the aftermath of Hurricane Sandy in 2012, which caused power outages citywide, especially to the city's payphones (which were connected to the municipal power supply of New York City). Antenna Design helped with the overall design of the kiosks, which are produced by Comark subsidiary Civiq.

==== Content and advertising ====
New York City does not pay for the system because CityBridge oversees the installation, ownership, and operations, and is responsible for building the new optic infrastructure under the streets. CityBridge stated in a press release that the network would be free for all users, and that the service would be funded by advertisements. This advertising provides revenue for New York City as well as for the partners involved in CityBridge. The advertising was estimated to bring in over $1 billion in revenue over its first twelve years, with the City of New York receiving over $500 million, or about half of that amount. The LinkNYC network was intended to act as a public internet utility with advertising services. In four of the first five years the Links have been active, actual revenue fell short of goals, as some local small businesses and non-profits were given advertisement space for free.

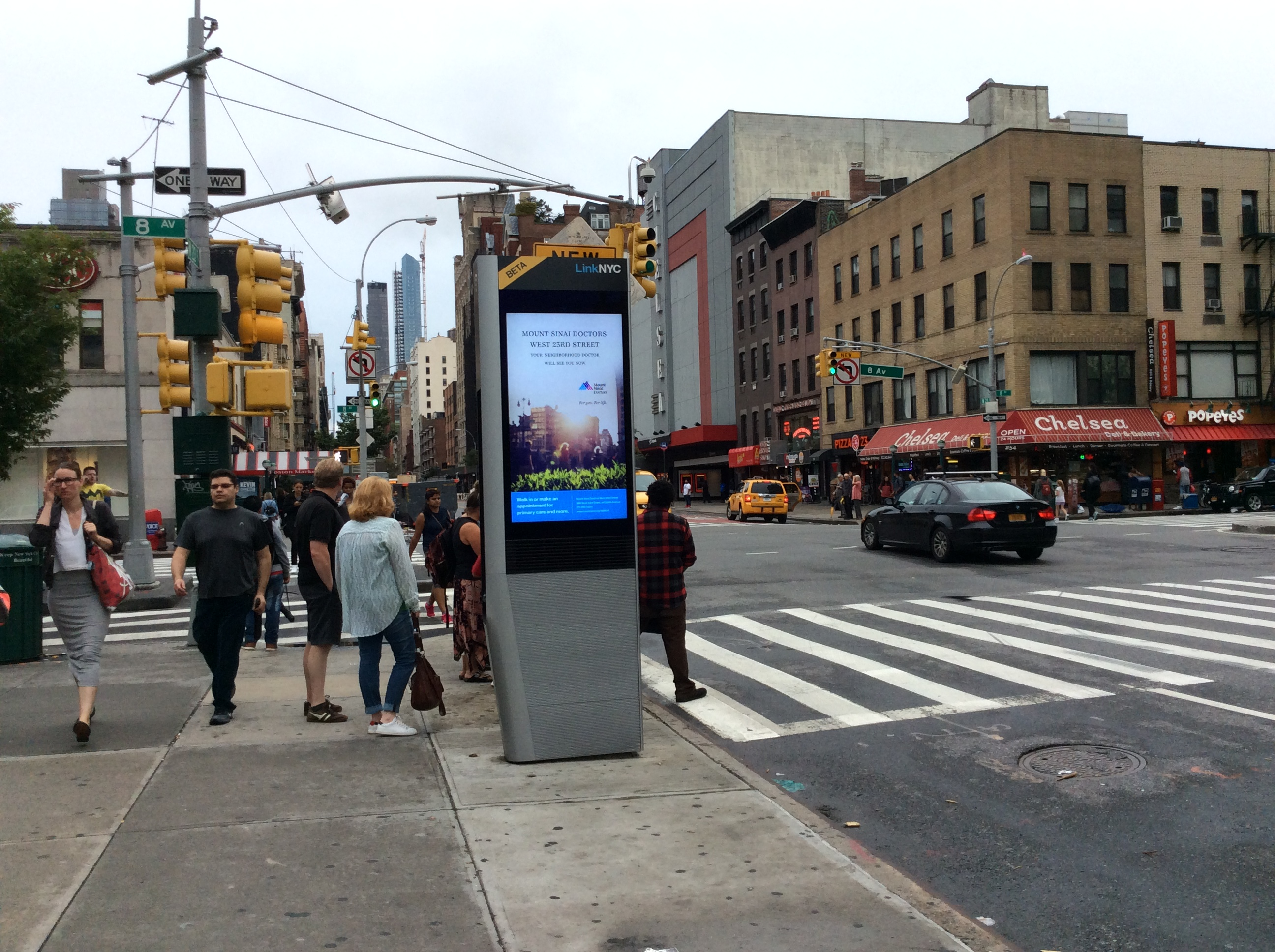
A LinkNYC kiosk at 23rd Street and Eighth Avenue, with side advertising panel

LinkNYC displays many kinds of content from advertising and community notes to artist and social media spotlights. Art on Link features New York City artists and displays their work on Link kiosks throughout the city. The Links' advertising screens also display "NYC Fun Facts", one-sentence factoids about New York City, as well as "This Day in New York" facts and historic photographs of the city, which are shown between advertisements. In April 2018, some advertising screens started displaying real-time bus arrival information for nearby bus routes, using data from the MTA Bus Time system. Other things displayed on Links include headlines from the Associated Press, as well as weather information, comics, contests, and "content collaborations" where third-party organizations display their own information. As part of the Link Local program, in 2017, LinkNYC began allowing small business owners to advertise on the nearest two LinkNYC kiosks to their stores. The kiosks have also run promotions for black-owned businesses and LGBT sites. After his election in 2026, Mayor Zohran Mamdani has used LinkNYC kiosks to promote new policies and to stream sporting games.

Links in some areas, especially lower-income and lower-traffic areas, were not intended to display advertisements because they were not worthwhile for CityBridge to advertise in these areas; these Links had slower network speeds than advertisement-enabled Links. Wealthier neighborhoods in Manhattan, Brooklyn, and Queens received the most Links with advertisements and fast network speeds, while poorer neighborhoods and Staten Island would get slower Links with no advertising. CityBridge sold fewer advertisements than expected, and it defaulted on $70 million owed to the city in July 2021.

=== 5G poles ===
CityBridge began installing Link5G poles across the city in 2022. Each pole measures 32 feet (9.8 m) tall, more than three times as high as the original kiosks; the FCC had mandated that the poles be at least 19.5 feet (5.9 m) high. In contrast to the kiosks, the Link5G poles were supposed to be installed in neighborhoods without good internet service; 90 percent of the poles were to be placed in the outer boroughs or in Upper Manhattan north of 96th Street.

The lower sections of many of the poles have tablets, USB charging ports, 9-1-1 call buttons, and advertising displays, similar to the original kiosks. The upper portions of each pole contain 5G equipment installed by telecommunications companies, which can rent space within the poles from CityBridge. The 5G antennas measure 63 inches (1,600 mm) tall and 21 feet (6.4 m) across. Next to each antenna is a box measuring 38 by 16 by 14 inches (970 by 410 by 360 mm). There are five transmitters atop each pole, measuring at least 29 inches (740 mm) tall. Although Wi-Fi service from the 5G poles is provided free of charge, users have to pay their telecom companies to receive 5G service. The poles also have cameras on them, but the cameras are not operational at all times.

== Network ==
According to its specifications, the Links' Wi-Fi covers a radius of 150 feet (46 m) to 400 feet (120 m). The Links' Wi-Fi is capable of running at 1 gigabit per second or 1000 megabits per second, which, at the time of the first Links' installation, was more than 100 times faster than the 8.7 megabit per second speed of the average public Wi-Fi network in the United States. LinkNYC's routers have neither a bandwidth cap nor a time limit for usage, and the free phone calls are also available for unlimited use. The network was initially only intended for use in public spaces, but was also intended to eventually "connect lighting systems, smart meters, traffic networks, connected cameras and other IoT systems," as well as for utility monitoring and for 5G installations.

CityBridge stated that it took security and privacy seriously "and will never sell any personally identifiable information or share with third parties for their own use". Aside from the unsecured network that devices can directly connect to, the Links provide an encrypted network. There are two types of networks: a private (secured WPA/WPA2) network called "LinkNYC Private" available only for certain devices, and a public network called "LinkNYC Free Public Wi-Fi".

Private network users have to accept a network key to log onto the LinkNYC Wi-Fi. This makes New York City one of the first American municipalities to have a free, encrypted Wi-Fi network, as well as North America's largest. At the time of launch, LinkNYC was the fastest citywide ISP in the world, with download and upload speeds between 15 and 32 times faster than on free networks at Starbucks, in LaGuardia Airport, and within New York City hotels.

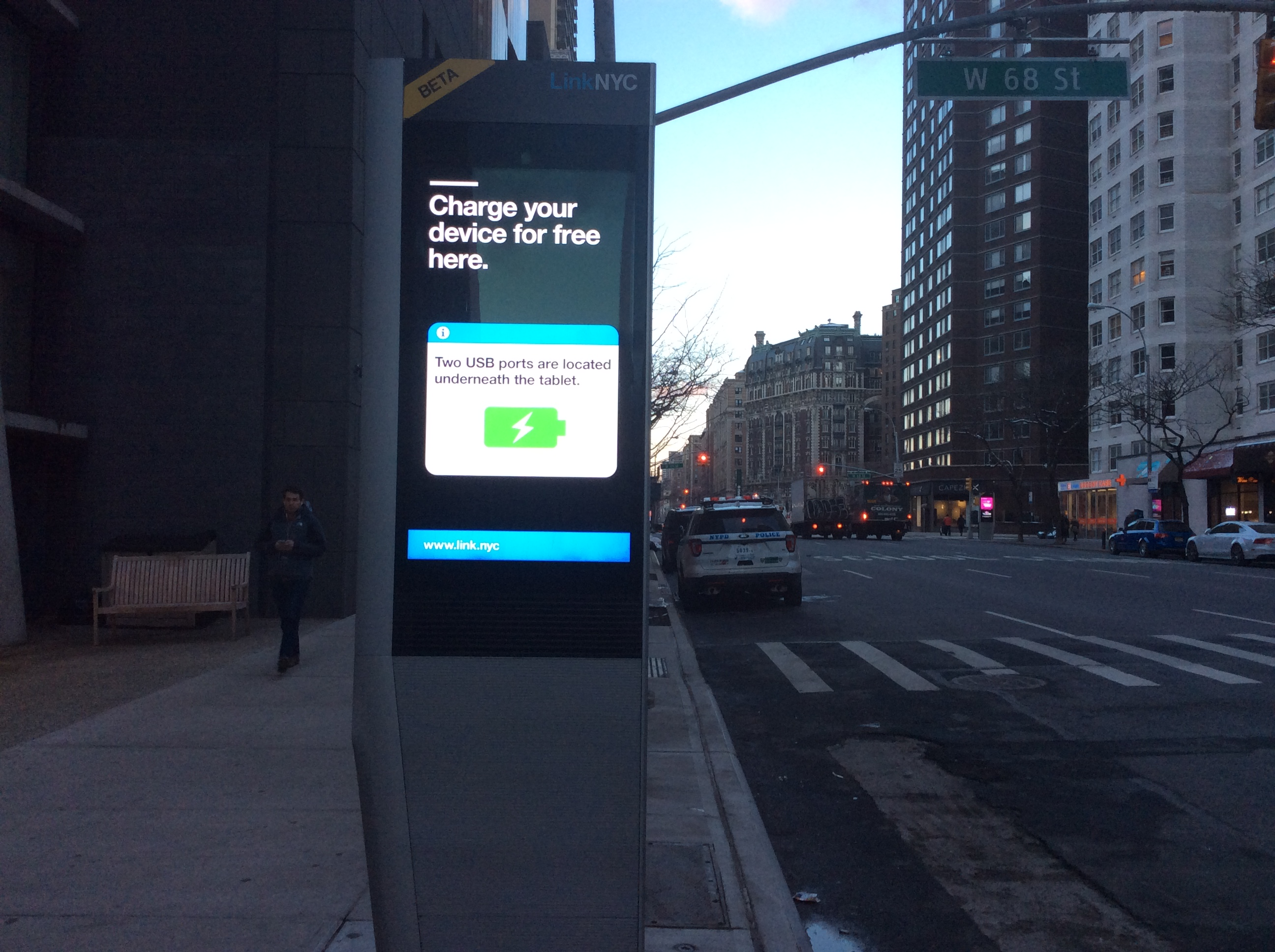
A Link advertising phone charging at the kiosk

Originally, the CityBridge consortium was supposed to include Transit Wireless, which maintains the New York City Subway's wireless system. However, as neither company mentioned each other on their respective websites, one communications writer speculated that the deal had either not been implemented yet or had fallen through. Transit Wireless stated that "those details have not been finalized yet", and CityBridge "promised to let [the writer] know when more information is available."

By September 2016, around 450,000 unique users and over 1 million devices connected to the Links in an average week. The Links had been used a total of more than 21 million times by that date. This had risen to over 576,000 unique users by October 4, with 21,000 phone calls made in the previous week alone. By January 2018, the number of calls registered by the LinkNYC system had risen to 200,000 per month, or 50,000 per week on average. There were also 600,000 unique users connecting to the Links' Wi-Fi or cellular services each week. The LinkNYC network exceeded 500,000 average monthly calls, 1 billion total sessions, and 5 million monthly users in September 2018. A poll in 2025 found that half of New Yorkers used Wi-Fi from a LinkNYC kiosk at least once a month, and that one-third of those surveyed used the LinkNYC Wi-Fi once a week.

One writer for the Motherboard website observed that the LinkNYC network also helped connect poor communities, as people from these communities come to congregate at the Links. This was because the network provides service to all New Yorkers regardless of income, but it especially helps residents who would have otherwise used their smartphones for internet access using 3G and 4G. The New York City Bureau of Policy and Research published a report in 2015 that stated that one-fourth of residents do not have home broadband internet access, including 32 percent of unemployed residents. Conversely, another Motherboard article in 2022 said that the efforts to connect poor communities had "stumbled" because of the uneven distribution of kiosks across the city.

As of January 2018, the most-dialed number on the LinkNYC network was the helpline for the state's electronic benefit transfer system, which distributes food stamps to low-income residents. The LinkNYC network is seen as only somewhat mitigating this internet inequality, as many poor neighborhoods, like some in the Bronx, will get relatively few Links. LinkNYC is an example of smart city infrastructure in New York City.

== Concerns ==
=== Tracking ===
The deployment of the Links and the method, process, eventual selection, and ownership of entities involved in the project has come under scrutiny by privacy advocates, who express concerns about the terms of service, the financial model, and the collection of end users' data. These concerns are aggravated by the involvement of Sidewalk Labs, which belongs to Google's holding company, Alphabet Inc. Google already has the ability to track the majority of all website visits, and LinkNYC could be used to track people's movements. Nick Pinto of the Village Voice, a Lower Manhattan newspaper, wrote:

Google is in the business of taking as much information as it can get away with, from as many sources as possible, until someone steps in to stop it. ... But LinkNYC marks a radical step even for Google. It is an effort to establish a permanent presence across our city, block by block, and to extend its online model to the physical landscape we humans occupy on a daily basis. The company then intends to clone that system and start selling it around the world, government by government, to as many as will buy.

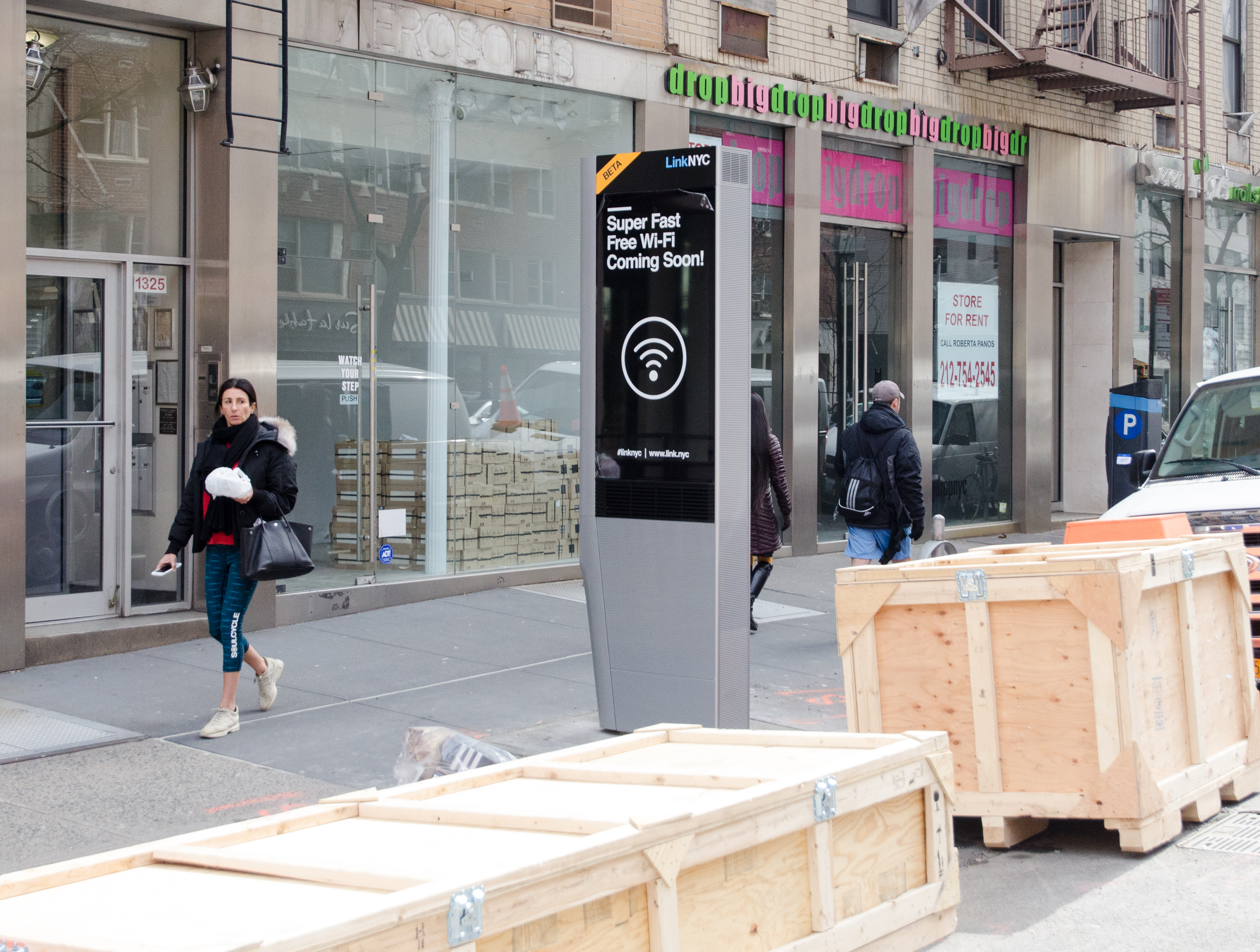
A newly installed Link

In March 2016, the New York Civil Liberties Union (NYCLU), the New York City office of the American Civil Liberties Union, wrote a letter to Mayor de Blasio outlining their privacy concerns. In the letter, representatives for the NYCLU wrote that CityBridge could be retaining too much information about LinkNYC users. They also stated that the privacy policy was vague and needed to be clarified. They recommended that the privacy policy be rewritten so that it expressly mentions whether the Links' environmental sensors or cameras are being used by the NYPD for surveillance or by other city systems. In response, LinkNYC updated its privacy policy to make clear that the kiosks do not store users' browsing history or track the websites visited while using LinkNYC's Wi-Fi, a step that NYCLU commended. Motherboard wrote in 2022 that the LinkNYC kiosks collected so much data from devices that, even though the data was anonymized, it was easy to identify individual users.

In an unrelated incident, Titan, one of the members of CityBridge, was accused of embedding Bluetooth radio transmitters in their phones, which could be used to track phone users' movements without their consent. These beacons were later found to have been permitted by the DOITT, but "without any public notice, consultation, or approval", so they were removed in October 2014. Despite the removal of the transmitters, Titan is proposing putting similar tracking devices on Links, but if the company decides to go through with the plan, it has to notify the public in advance.

In 2018, a New York City College of Technology undergraduate student, Charles Meyers, found that LinkNYC had published folders on GitHub titled "LinkNYC Mobile Observation" and "RxLocation". He shared these with The Intercept website, which wrote that the folders indicated that identifiable user data was being collected, including information on the user's coordinates, web browser, operating system, and device details, among other things. However, LinkNYC disputed these claims and filed a Digital Millennium Copyright Act claim to force GitHub to remove files containing code that Meyers had copied from LinkNYC's GitHub account.

=== Other privacy issues ===
According to LinkNYC, it does not monitor its kiosks' Wi-Fi, nor does it give information to third parties. However, data will be given to law enforcement officials in situations where LinkNYC is legally obliged. Its privacy policy states that it can collect personally identifiable information (PII) from users to give to "service providers, and sub-contractors to the extent reasonably necessary to enable us provide the Services; a third party that acquires CityBridge or a majority of its assets [if CityBridge was acquired by that third party]; a third party with whom we must legally share information about you; you, upon your request; [and] other third parties with your express consent to do so." Non-personally identifiable information can be shared with service providers and advertisers. The privacy policy also states that "in the event that we receive a request from a governmental entity to provide it with your Personally [sic] Information, we will take reasonable attempts to notify you of such request, to the extent possible."

Despite the WPA/WPA2 encryption, hackers may still be able to steal other users' data, and there have been concerns that hackers could spoof the free network to steal data. To reduce the risk of data theft, LinkNYC deployed a better encryption system for devices that have Hotspot 2.0. Another concern was that hackers could affect the tablet itself by redirecting it to a malware site when users put in PII, or adding a keystroke logging program to the tablets. To protect against this, CityBridge places in "a series of filters and proxies" that prevents malware from being installed; ends a session when a tablet is detected communicating with a command-and-control server; and resets the entire kiosk after 15 seconds of inactivity. The USB ports have been configured so that they can only be used to charge devices. However, the USB ports are still susceptible to physical tampering with skimmers, which may lead to a user's device getting a malware infection while charging; this is prevented by the anti-vandalism sensors on each Link.

Yet another concern is that a person may carry out a spoofing attack by renaming their personal Wi-Fi network to "LinkNYC." This is potentially dangerous since many electronic devices tend to automatically connect to networks with a given name, but do not differentiate between the different networks. One reporter for The Verge suggested that to circumvent this, a person could turn off their mobile device's Wi-Fi while in the vicinity of a kiosk, or "forget" the LinkNYC network altogether.

The cameras on the top of each kiosk's tablet posed a concern in some communities where these cameras face the interiors of buildings. However, as of July 2017, the cameras were not activated.

=== Browser access and content filtering ===
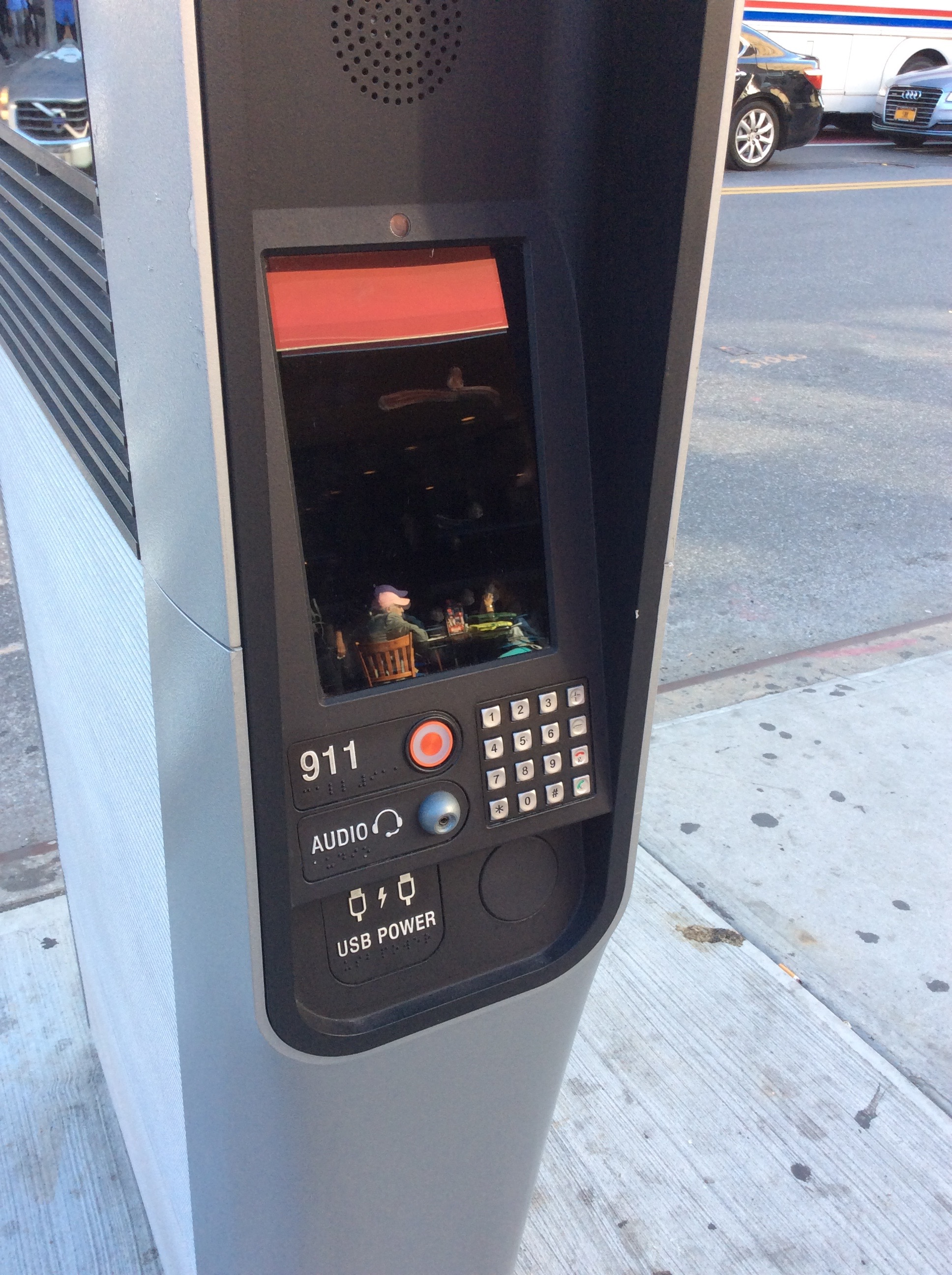
A Link with its tablet turned off due to the screens' browsing capabilities being shut off in September 2016. Instead, the tablet shows the reflection of the street scene in the background.

In the summer of 2016, a content filter was set up on the Links to restrict navigation to certain websites, such as pornography sites and other sites with not safe for work (NSFW) content. This was described as a problem especially among the homeless, and at least one video showed a homeless man watching pornography on a LinkNYC tablet. This problem has supposedly been ongoing since at least January 2016. Despite the existence of the filter, Link users still found a way to bypass these filters.

The filters, which consisted of Google SafeSearch as well as a web blocker that was based on the web blockers of many schools, were intentionally lax to begin with because LinkNYC feared that stricter filters that blocked certain keywords would alienate customers. Other challenges included the fact that "stimulating" user-generated content can be found on popular, relatively interactive websites like Tumblr and YouTube; it is hard to block NSFW content on these sites, because that would entail blocking the entire website when only a small portion hosts NSFW content. In addition, it was hard, if not impossible, for LinkNYC to block new websites with NSFW content, as such websites are constantly being created.

A few days after Díaz's and Johnson's statements, the web browsers of the tablets embedded into the Links were disabled indefinitely due to concerns of illicit activities such as drug deals and NSFW website browsing. LinkNYC cited "lewd acts" as the reason for shutting off the tables' browsing capabilities. One Murray Hill resident reported that a homeless man "enthusiastically hump[ed]" a Link in her neighborhood while watching pornography. Despite the tablets being disabled, the 9-1-1 capabilities, maps, and phone calls would still be usable, and people can still use LinkNYC Wi-Fi from their own devices.

The disabling of the LinkNYC tablets' browsers had stoked fears about further restrictions on the Links. The Independent, a British newspaper, surveyed some homeless New Yorkers and found that while most of these homeless citizens used the kiosks for legitimate reasons (usually not to browse NSFW content), many of the interviewees were scared that LinkNYC may eventually charge money to use the internet via the Links, or that the kiosks may be demolished altogether. The Guardian, another British newspaper, came to a similar conclusion; one of the LinkNYC users they interviewed said that the Links are "very helpful, but of course bad people messed it up for everyone". In a press release, LinkNYC refuted fears that service would be paywalled or eliminated, though it did state that several improvements, including dimming the kiosks and lowering maximum volumes, were being implemented to reduce the kiosks' effect on the surrounding communities.

Immediately after the disabling of the tablets' browsing capabilities, reports of loitering near kiosks decreased by more than 80 percent. By the next year, such complaints had dropped 96 percent from the pre-September 2016 figure. The tablets' use, as a whole, has increased 12 percent, with more unique users accessing maps, phone calls, and 3-1-1.

=== Nuisance complaints ===
There have been scattered complaints in some communities that the LinkNYC towers themselves are a nuisance. These complaints mainly have to do with loitering, browser access, and kiosk volume, the latter two of which the city has resolved. However, these nuisance complaints are rare citywide; of the 920 kiosks installed citywide by then, there had been only one complaint relating to the kiosk design itself.

In September 2016, the borough president of the Bronx, Rubén Díaz Jr., called on city leaders to take stricter action, saying that "after learning about the inappropriate and over-extended usage of Links throughout the city, in particular in Manhattan, it is time to make adjustments that will allow all of our city residents to use this service safely and comfortably." City Councilman Corey Johnson said that some police officials had called for several Links in Chelsea to be removed because homeless men had been watching NSFW content on these Links while children were nearby. Barbara A. Blair, president of the Garment District Alliance, stated that "people are congregating around these Links to the point where they're bringing furniture and building little encampments clustered around them. It's created this really unfortunate and actually deplorable condition."

A related problem arising from the tablets' browser access was that even though the tablets were intended for people to use it for a short period of time, the Links began being "monopolized" almost as soon as they were unveiled. Some people would use the Links for hours at a time. Particularly, homeless New Yorkers would sometimes loiter around the Links, using newspaper dispensers and milk crates as "makeshift furniture" on which they could sit while using the Links. The New York Post characterized the Links as having become "living rooms for vagrants". As a result, LinkNYC staff were working on a way to help ensure that Links would not be monopolized by one or two people. Proposals for solutions included putting time limits on how long the tablets could be used by any one person.

Some people stated that the Links could also be used for loitering and illicit phone calls. One Hell's Kitchen bar owner cited concerns about the users of a Link located right outside his bar, including a homeless man who a patron complained was a "creeper" watching animal pornography, as well as several people who made drug deals using the Link's phone capabilities while families were nearby. In Greenpoint, locals alleged that after Links were activated in their neighborhood in July 2017, these particular kiosks became locations for drug deals; however, that particular Link was installed near a known drug den.

== Wider deployment ==
Intersection, in collaboration with British telecommunications company BT and British advertising agency Primesight, is also planning to install up to 850 Links in the United Kingdom, including in London, beginning in 2017. The LinkUK kiosks, as they will be called, are similar to the LinkNYC kiosks in New York City. These Links will replace some of London's iconic telephone booths due to these booths' age. The first hundred Links would be installed in the borough of Camden. The Links will have tablets, but they will lack web browsing capabilities due to the problems that LinkNYC faced in enabling the tablet browsers.

In early 2016, Intersection announced that it could install about 100 Links in a mid-sized city in the United States, provided that it wins the United States Department of Transportation's Smart City Challenge. Approximately 25 of that city's blocks will get the Links, which will be integrated with Sidewalk Labs' transportation data-analysis initiative, Flow. In summer 2016, the city of Columbus, Ohio, was announced as the winner of the Smart City Challenge. Intersection has proposed installing Links in four Columbus neighborhoods.

In July 2017, the city of Hoboken, New Jersey, located across the Hudson River from Manhattan, proposed adding free Wi-Fi kiosks on its busiest pedestrian corridors. The kiosks, which are also a smart-city initiative, are proposed to be installed by Intersection.

== See also ==
- Municipal wireless network
