= Intersection (company) =

American technology and advertising company

- Industry: Infrastructure; Out-of-home advertising; Smart city technology
- Predecessor: Control Group; Titan
- Founded: June 2015; 11 years ago
- Headquarters: New York, NY, U.S.,
- Key people: Ari Buchalter (CEO); Dan Doctoroff (Chairman)
- Website: www.intersection.com

Intersection is a smart cities technology and out-of-home advertising company. It was formed as a result of a merger between Control Group and Titan in June 2015. Intersection is known for its product LinkNYC.

== History ==
=== Founding and pre merger ===
In 2001, Control Group was founded as a technology and design consultancy firm by Scott Anderson, Campbell Hyers, and Colin O'Donnell. Around the same time, Titan was founded as an out of home advertising company. In March 2006, Titan acquired a media company in England, Maiden Outdoor.

In December 2006, Titan won a $832 million advertising contract for the New York City Metropolitan Transportation Authority (NY MTA). In May 2009, Titan began to fall behind on its advertising payments to the NY MTA, and in February 2010, after months of negotiation, Titan lost its advertising contract with the NY MTA. In 2010, Control Group partnered with Fashion GPS to create bar code technology for use at New York Fashion Week.

In March 2013, Control Group began installing the New York City Metropolitan Transportation Authority "On the Go kiosks" The kiosks include upcoming arrival information, maps, trip planning, and service announcements.

=== Merger and investments ===
On June 23, 2015, a consortium of investors led by Sidewalk Labs acquired and merged Control Group and Titan into a new company named Intersection. This merger brought together the expertise of both companies to work on projects such as the recently won contract for LinkNYC. In November 2017, Intersection raised $150 million in a funding round led by Graham Holdings Company.

This funding round did not include Sidewalk Labs, the lead investor from the prior funding round. In June 2018, Intersection launched a programmatic display advertising platform called Place Exchange intended to be used for digital out of home advertising.

== Smart cities products ==
=== Link kiosks ===
In November 2014, the Link product was announced and, in 2015, was first installed in New York City as LinkNYC. The project aims to turn 7,500 old public pay phones into kiosks delivering a variety of features, including free gigabit Wi-Fi, free voice calls, USB charging, displays for advertising content, and access to city services.

In October 2016, Intersection collaborated with British internet provider BT and advertising agency Primesight to install links in London. In November 2017, Intersection announced plans to install Link kiosks in Philadelphia by the end of 2018. In October 2018, Intersection launched LinkNWK in Newark, New Jersey, its second location in the United States. Intersection will install forty five Link kiosks throughout Newark, funded by advertising with partners like United Airlines.

=== Transit ===
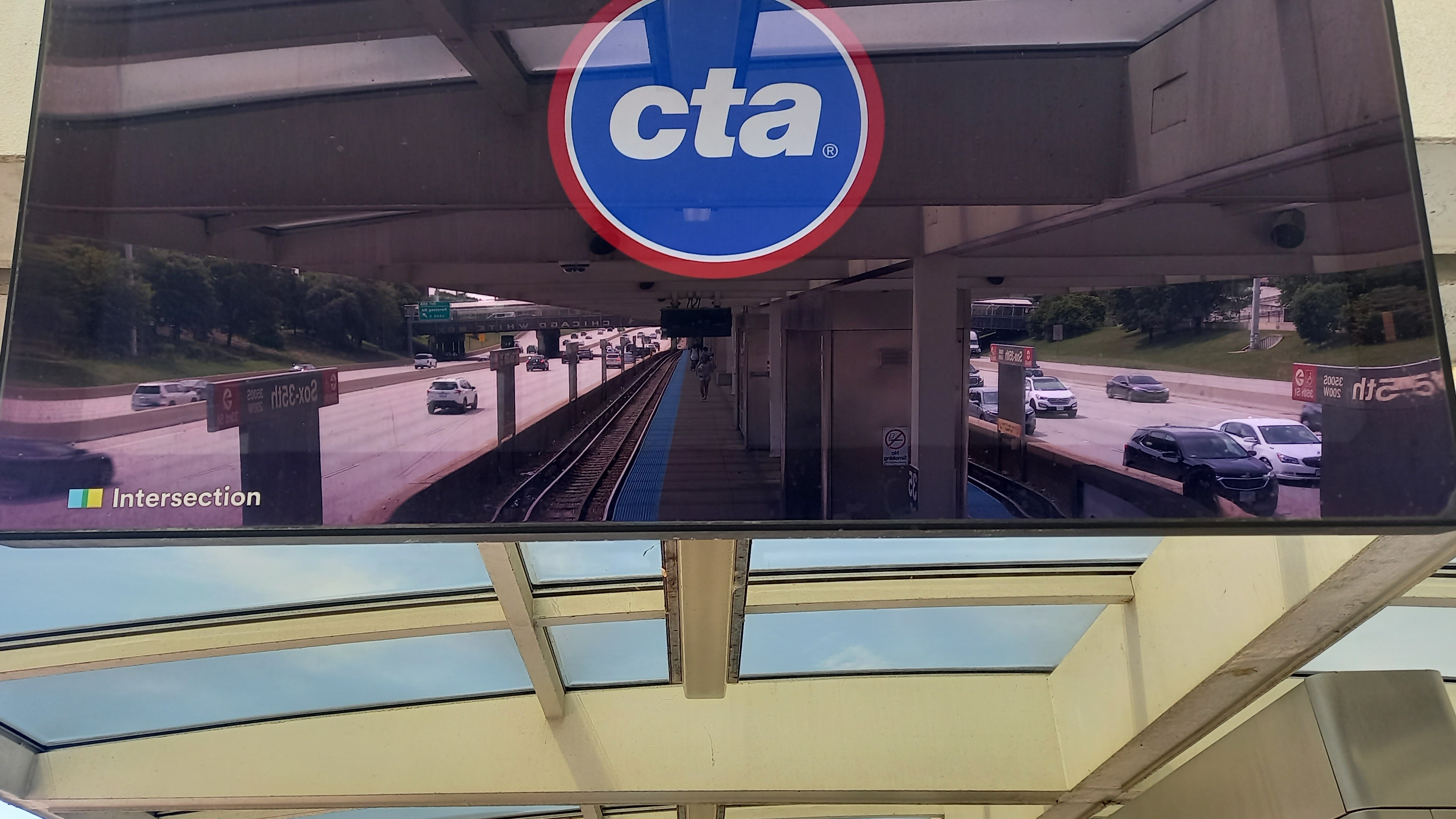
Digital display on a public transit station in Chicago

Intersection continues to operate the NY MTA "On the Go" kiosks produced by its predecessor, Control Group. The kiosks include features such as maps, directions, service advisories, and advertising.

Intersection operates digital displays and kiosks for multiple transit agencies, including:

- Chicago Transit Authority
- New York City Metropolitan Transportation Authority
- NJ Transit
- SEPTA
- Los Angeles County Metropolitan Transportation Authority

In May 2018, Intersection and NJ Transit launched IxNTouch interactive displays at several locations. In May 2019, Intersection and LA Metro launched new advert funded IxNTouch information screens along Blue Line stations.

=== Shoutable ===
In May 2019, Intersection published an iOS app called Shoutable that lets users post sixty second messages on LinkNYC screens. These messages were similar to e-cards, and allowed users to enter approved names for the message.

As of October 2019, the Shoutable app is no longer available.

== Controversy ==
In September 2016, Intersection removed web browsing capabilities from the LinkNYC kiosks after reported instances of inappropriate content being accessed via the tablets.

Since the launch of the Link product, privacy concerns have been raised over Wi-Fi tracking and camera usage. In September 2018, source code was accidentally made available on the internet that could be used for location tracking.
