= LinkUK =

WiFi infrastructure project

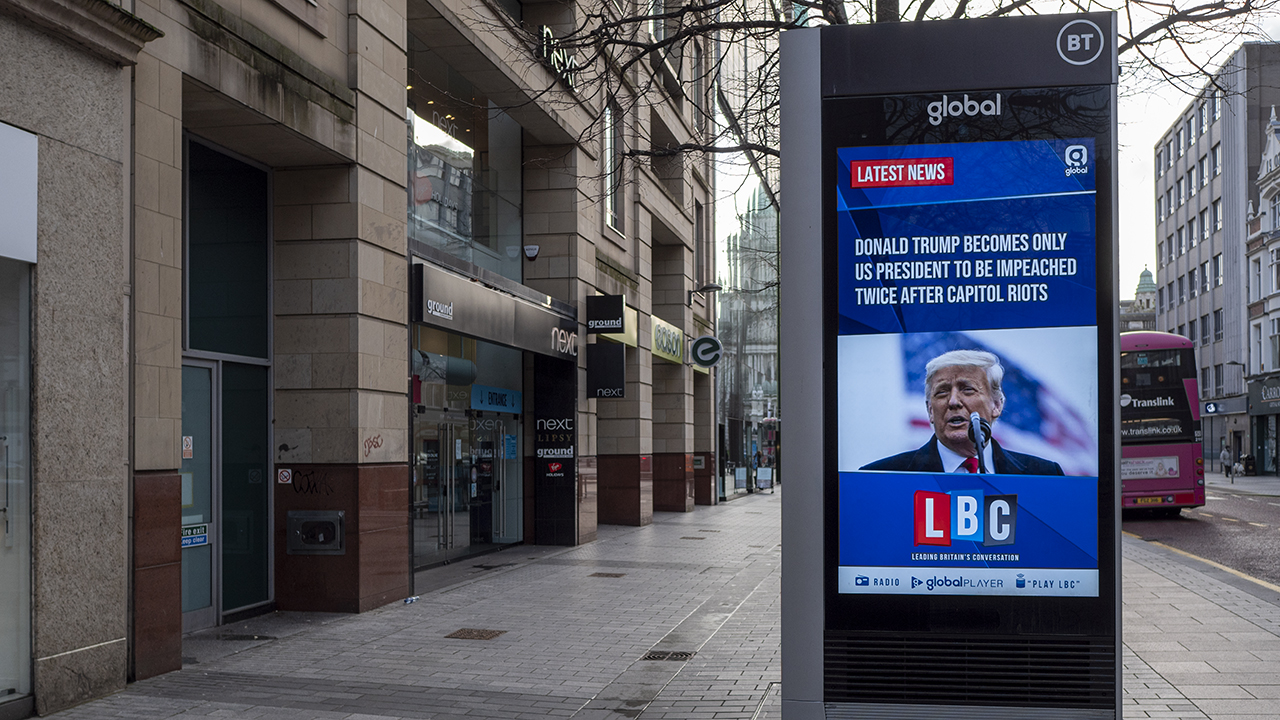
- Street Hub in Donegall Place, Belfast
- Founded: October 25, 2016; 9 years ago
- Headquarters: London, England, United Kingdom
- Area served: Greater London; Sheffield; Birmingham; Portsmouth
- Brands: LinkUK
- Services: Wireless communication
- Owner: Intersection, BT Group, Global
- Website: business.bt.com/public-sector/street-hubs

LinkUK or InLinkUK is an infrastructure project that planned to cover major cities in the United Kingdom with free Wi-Fi service. LinkUK kiosks, called Links, was initially rolled out in the London borough of Camden in 2017, and later in Lambeth, Hammersmith & Fulham and other boroughs. Afterwards, it was intended that Links would be installed in the remainder of Greater London and eventually across major cities in the UK. LinkUK is an expansion of the LinkNYC project covering New York City with free Wi-Fi service.

InLink Limited, the company set up to install and manage InLinkUK's WiFi kiosks, together with BT, Intersection and advertising firm Primesight, entered administration in 2019, casting doubt over the future of the project. To resolve the problem, BT purchased the part of the InLink network that they did not already own, and re-branded the kiosks as "Street Hubs", and in 2021 launched the next, improved version.

== History ==
In 2015, BT Group sought an advertising partner to maintain advertisements situated in its 17,500 telephone booths across the UK. BT ultimately partnered with Intersection, the owner of LinkNYC, and Primesight, a London-based advertising agency. BT will remove certain telephone booths for the Links and provide the network infrastructure. In return, Intersection and Primesight will display advertising on two dedicated screens on the kiosks.

In 2018, Primesight was acquired by Global Media & Entertainment.

== Services ==
The Links will provide free Wi-Fi access with speeds up to 1 gigabit per second, while displays on both sides of the Link will display digital advertisements. The Links feature a tablet, two USB charging ports, and a phone providing free calling to UK numbers. Devices can access the Links' network without time or access limits. Each Link's tablet will provide basic functionality, such as maps and access to emergency services.

As of 2021, the kiosks also show news headlines from Global's radio station LBC.

== Complaints ==
While LinkNYC was being rolled out, kiosks' web browsers were being used to access inappropriate content such as pornography. Amid this concern, LinkUK kiosks' tablets will not have a web browser.

In the UK there have been complaints that the free phone service is being exploited by drug dealers.
