= Titan (transit advertising company) =

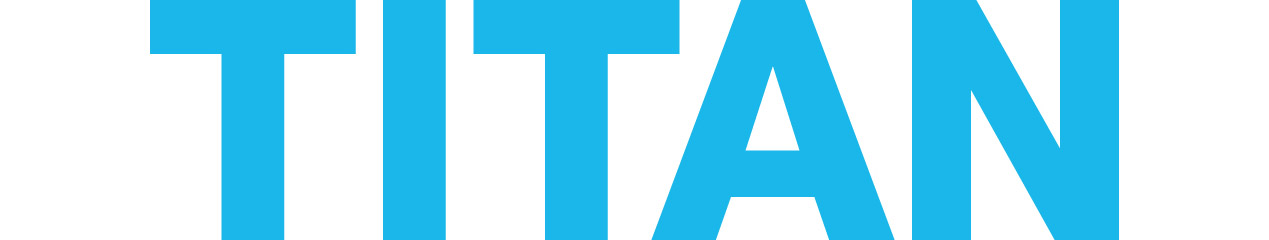
- Company type: Private
- Industry: Advertising
- Genre: Out-of-home advertising
- Founded: 2001
- Fate: Merged with Control Group to form Intersection, acquired by a consortium of investors led by Sidewalk Labs
- Headquarters: New York City, New York, United States
- Website: Titan360.com

Titan was an American advertising firm that specialized in out-of-home advertising, headquartered in New York City, New York. A privately held company, it was the largest transit advertising company in North America until a 2015 merger. The company provided services for outdoor advertising on transit vehicles and stations, telephone kiosks, and street banners.

== History ==
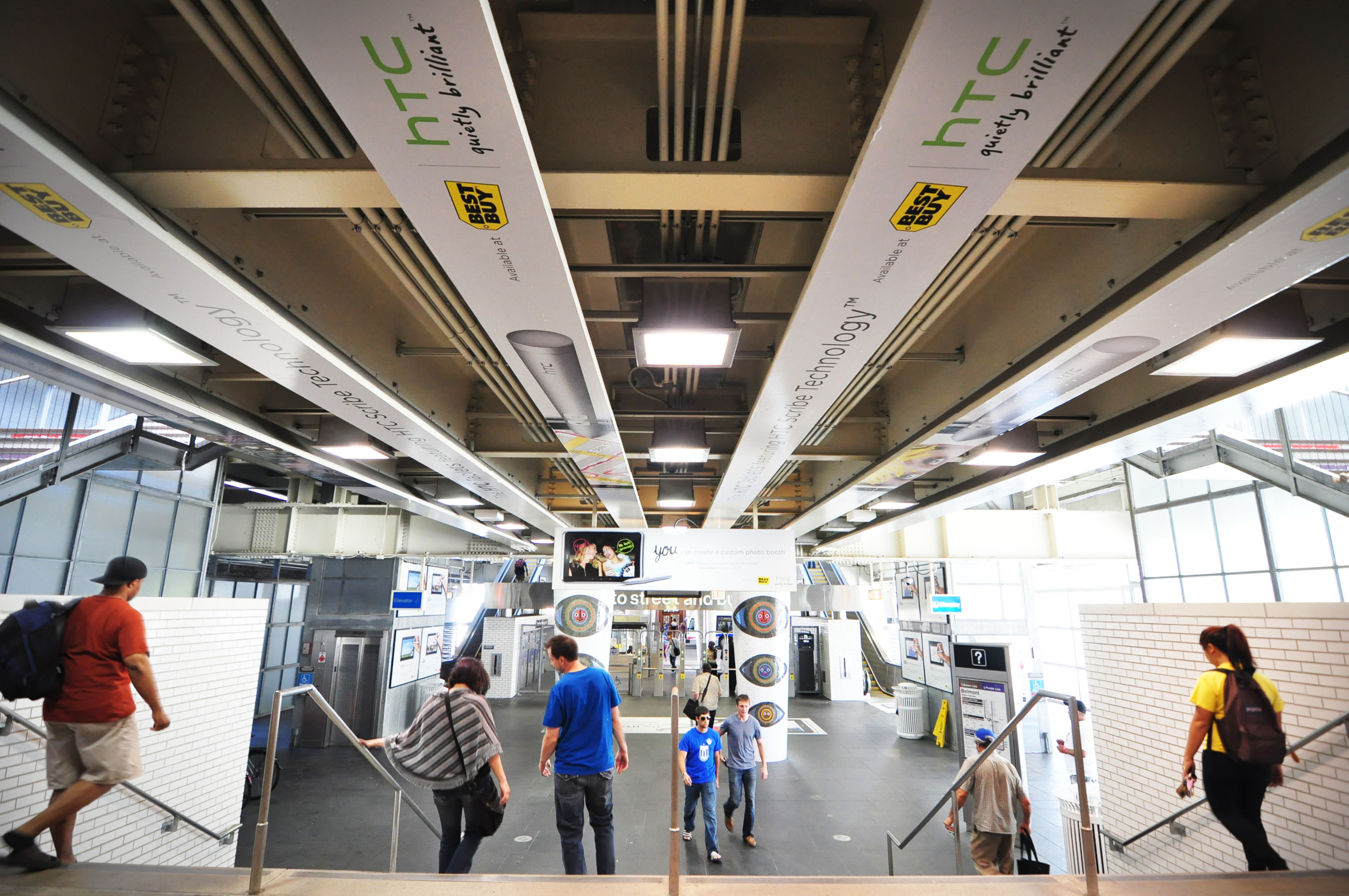
Advertising run by Titan on the Chicago "L" system

It was founded in 2001 by the executives who ran TDI, which in the 1990s was the largest Transit Advertising Sales company in the world, and ultimately grew to $800 million in annual sales. TDI was sold to CBS Corporation in 1996 and in 2001 Bill Apfelbaum founded Titan with Don Allman joining as Titan's chief executive officer in the fall of 2002.

During the recession of 2008–2009, the company renegotiated each of its transit contracts except that with New York City's MTA. In July 2010, it completed a consensual restructuring with its banks and investors.

On June 23, 2015, Titan and Control Group announced their merger into one company, known as Intersection, and acquisition by a consortium of investors led by Sidewalk Labs, a subsidiary of Alphabet Inc. Sidewalk Labs's rationale for the acquisition centered upon Titan and Control Group's involvement in the LinkNYC project, which will aim to provide free, ad-supported Wi-Fi across New York City.
