= Craig Nevill-Manning =

New Zealand computer scientist

Craig Graham Nevill-Manning (né Nevill) is a New Zealand computer scientist who founded Google's first remote engineering centre, located in midtown Manhattan, where he is a Distinguished Engineer. He also created Froogle (now Google Shopping), a product search engine. He was CTO and Head of Engineering at Sidewalk Labs from 2016 to 2022.

== Academic and professional career ==
Nevill-Manning graduated with a BSc in computer science from the University of Canterbury. He received his PhD from the University of Waikato where he was a co-creator of the Weka machine learning suite and the Greenstone digital library software. His doctoral advisor was Ian Witten. In 1994, he invented the sequitur algorithm, which uses data compression to infer the structure of a sequence of symbols.

Craig was invited to join Google at its formation but declined and then joined a little later on.

Prior to joining Google in 2001 as a senior research scientist, he was an assistant professor in the Computer Science Department at Rutgers University, and was a post-doctoral fellow in the Biochemistry department at Stanford University. His research interests centre on using techniques from machine learning, data compression and computational biology to provide more structured search over information.

In 2016, Nevill-Manning joined Alphabet, Inc. subsidiary Sidewalk Labs as CTO. In 2022, Nevill-Manning re-joined Google as part of Google’s urban sustainability product efforts.

== Awards ==
In 2009, he won a World Class New Zealand Award in the Information and Communications category.

In 2010, Nevill-Manning received a distinguished alumni award from the University of Waikato.

== Community ==
In his own time, Craig manages a website service that puts Olympic glory in proportion. He asks: "Who leads the world in medals when you correct for population? That is, which country wins the most medals per capita?" His site, which is updated daily during the Olympics, provides the answer: Olympic Medals per Capita. Media interest in per-capita statistics typically surround his website each Olympic games.
