= Ian Witten =

English computer scientist in New Zealand (born 1947)

Ian Witten FRSNZ
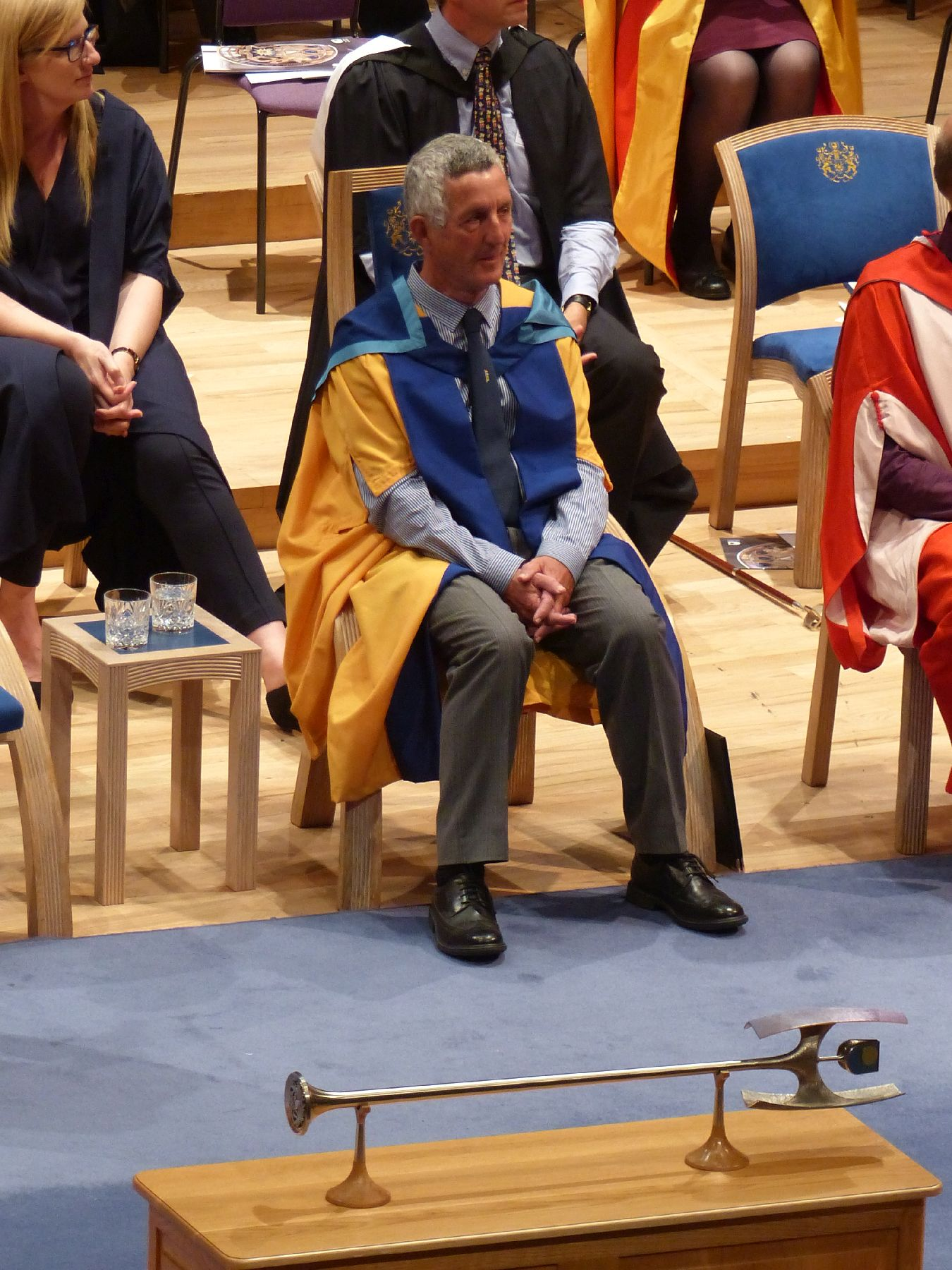
- Witten having received an Honorary Doctorate from the Open University in 2017
- Born: Ian Hugh Witten; 4 March 1947; Horsham, Sussex, England
- Died: 5 May 2023 (aged 76); Matangi, New Zealand
- Education: University of Cambridge (MA); University of Calgary (MSc); University of Essex (PhD)
- Known for: WEKA
- Awards: ACM Fellow (1996); Hector Medal (2005)
- Scientific career
- Fields: Data mining Machine learning Digital libraries
- Thesis: Learning to control (1976)
- Notable students: Craig Nevill-Manning; Saul Greenberg
- Website: www.cs.waikato.ac.nz/~ihw

Ian Hugh Witten (4 March 1947 – 5 May 2023) was a computer scientist at the University of Waikato, New Zealand. He was a Chartered Engineer with the Institute of Electrical Engineers.

== Early life and education ==
Witten was born in Horsham, Sussex, England, on 4 March 1947. He graduated from the University of Cambridge with a BA and MA (First Class Honours) in mathematics in 1969 and a Master of Science degree in mathematics and computer science from the University of Calgary, where he was a Commonwealth Scholar, in 1970. He received his PhD in 1976 from the University of Essex.

In 1971, Witten married Pamela Foden at the Chapel of Gonville and Caius College, Cambridge. The couple went on to have two daughters.

== Career and research ==
Witten discovered temporal-difference learning, inventing the tabular TD(0), the first temporal-difference learning rule for reinforcement learning. Witten was a co-creator of the Sequitur algorithm and conceived and obtained funding for the development of the original WEKA software package for data mining. Witten further made considerable contributions to the field of compression, creating novel algorithms for text and image compression with Alistair Moffat and Timothy C. Bell. He is also one of the major contributors to the digital libraries field, and founder of the Greenstone Digital Library Software.

His former doctoral students include Craig Nevill-Manning and Saul Greenberg.

=== Awards and honours ===
Witten was elected a ACM Fellow in 1996 and a Fellow of the Royal Society of New Zealand (FRSNZ) in 1997.

In 2004 he received the International Federation for Information Processing Namur Award for "contributions to the awareness of social implications of information technology, and the need for an holistic approach in the use of information technology that takes account of social implications" and in 2005 the Hector Medal for contributions to many areas of computer science.

== Later life and death ==
Witten retired from the University of Waikato in 2014, and was accorded the title of professor emeritus. He was diagnosed with cancer in November 2022, and died on 5 May 2023.

=== Publications ===
His publications included:

- Data mining: practical machine learning tools and techniques with Java implementations
- Communicating with Microcomputers
- Principles of Computer Speech
- Making Computers Talk: an Introduction to Speech Synthesis
- Text Compression
- The Reactive Keyboard
- Managing Gigabytes: Compressing and Indexing Documents and Images
- Web Dragons: Inside the Myths of Search Engine Technology
- How to Build a Digital Library
- Data Mining: Practical Machine Learning Tools and Techniques
