= Saul Greenberg =

Computer scientist specializing in human-computer interaction and ubiquitous computing

- Born: 1954 (age 71–72)
- Education: University of Calgary (PhD)
- Awards: ACM Fellow (2012)
- Scientific career
- Fields: Human–computer interaction Ubiquitous computing Computer Supported Cooperative Work
- Thesis: Tool use, reuse, and organization in command-driven interfaces (1988)
- Doctoral advisor: Ian Witten
- Website: saul.cpsc.ucalgary.ca

Saul Greenberg (born 1954) is a computer scientist, a Faculty Professor and Professor Emeritus at the University of Calgary. He was awarded ACM Fellowship in 2012 for contributions to computer supported cooperative work and ubiquitous computing.

== Education ==
Greenberg was educated at the University of Calgary where he received a PhD in 1988 for research on command-driven interfaces supervised by Ian Witten.

== Career and research ==
Greenberg's research interests are in Human–computer interaction (HCI), Ubiquitous computing and Computer Supported Cooperative Work.

=== Publications ===
His most cited publications include:

- Real time groupware as a distributed system
- Usability evaluation considered harmful (some of the time)
- A descriptive framework of workspace awareness for real-time groupware
- How people revisit web pages: empirical findings and implications for the design of history systems
- Phidgets: easy development of physical interfaces through physical widgets
- Readings in Human-Computer Interaction: toward the year 2000
