= Daniel L. Doctoroff =

American businessman (born 1958)

Dan Doctoroff
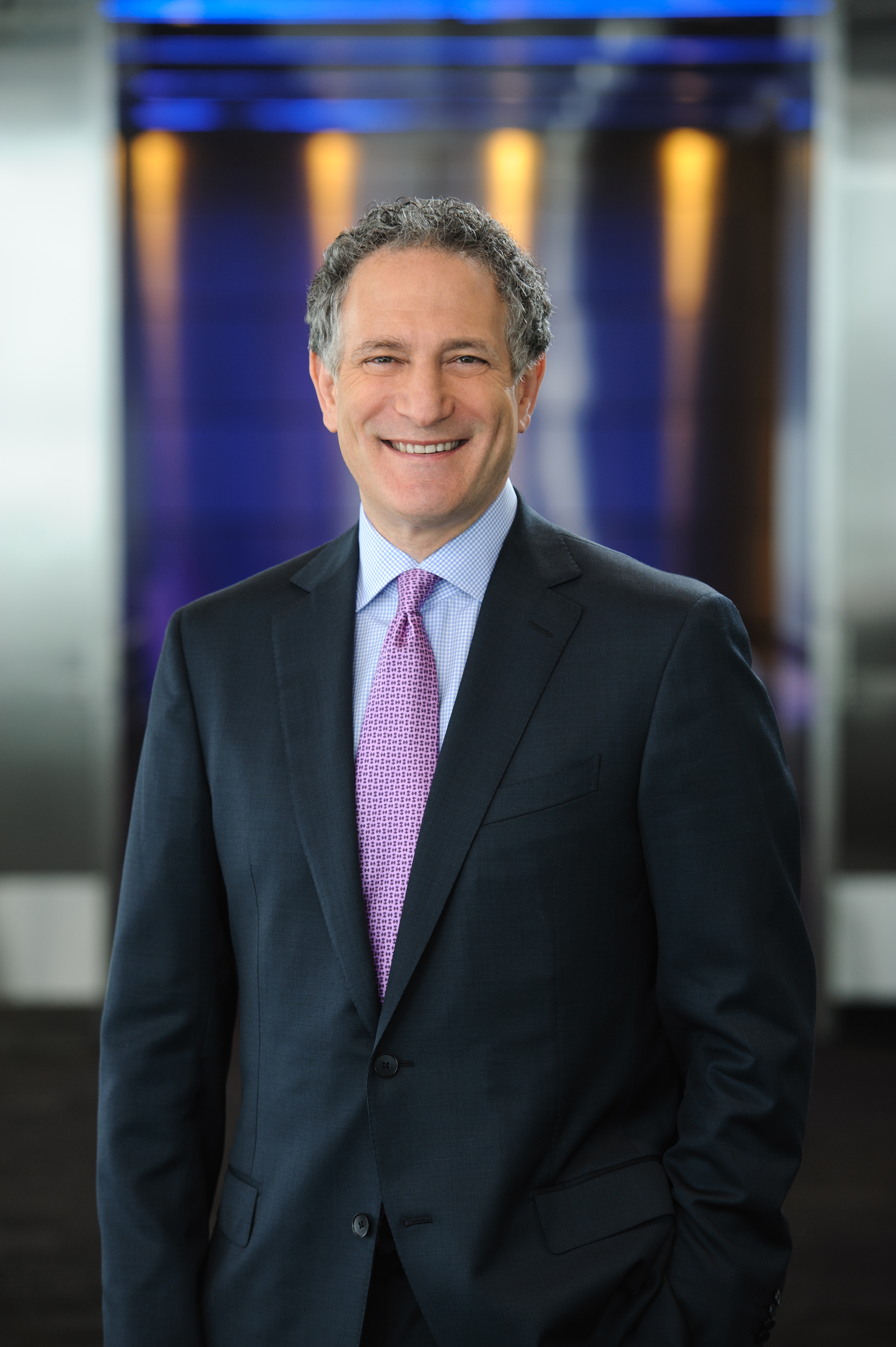
- Born: Daniel Louis Doctoroff; July 11, 1958 (age 68); Newark, New Jersey, U.S.
- Education: Harvard University (BA); University of Chicago (JD)
- Known for: Former president and CEO of Bloomberg L.P.; Former CEO of Sidewalk Labs; Former deputy mayor of economic development for New York City
- Spouse: Alisa Robbins (m. 1981)
- Children: 3

Signature
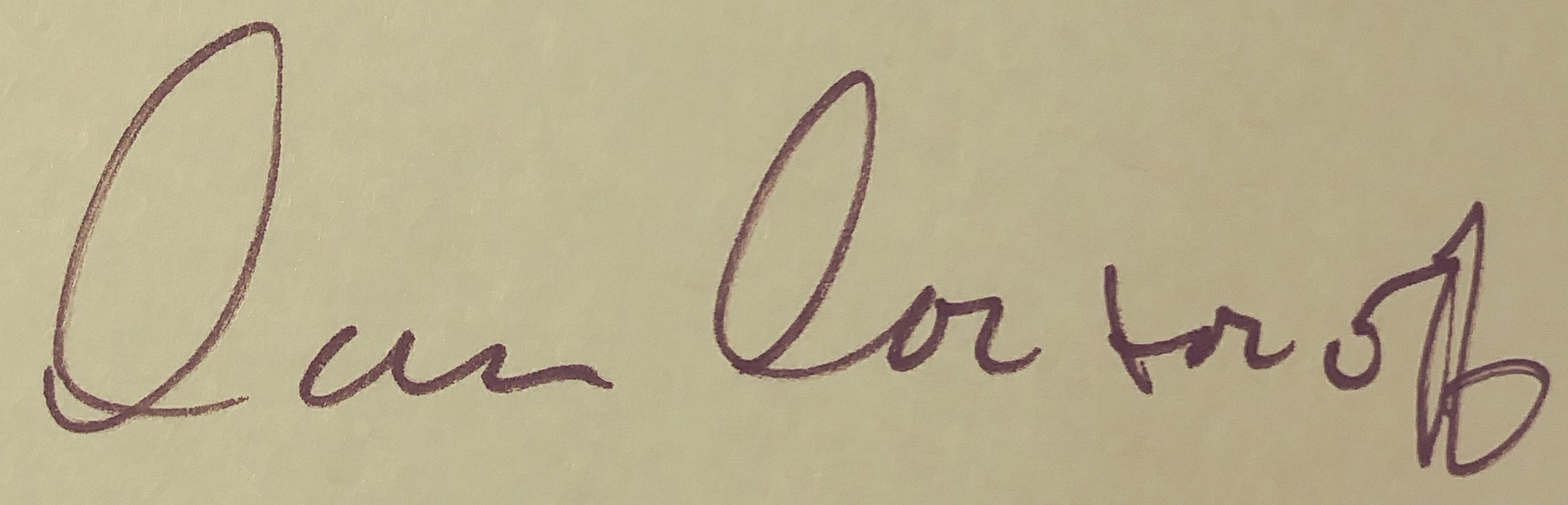

Daniel Louis Doctoroff (born July 11, 1958) is an American businessman and former government official. From 2015 to 2021, he was Chief Executive Officer of Sidewalk Labs, a startup company he helped found, focused on technology for city life. Previously, he was the CEO and President of Bloomberg L.P., Deputy Mayor for Economic Development and Rebuilding for New York City under Mike Bloomberg from January 2002 to December 31, 2007, led New York City's bid for the 2008 and 2012 Summer Olympics, and a managing partner at Oak Hill Capital Partners, a private equity investment firm.

== Early life ==
Doctoroff was born in Newark, New Jersey. His father, Martin Myles Doctoroff, was a former FBI agent who left the organization when Doctoroff was two years old and a Michigan Court of Appeals judge. His mother, Allene Doctoroff, was a psychologist who held a PhD. He grew up in Birmingham, Michigan, the eldest of four sons. He attended Seaholm High School.

In 1980, Doctoroff received a B.A. degree in government from Harvard College and a J.D. degree from the University of Chicago Law School in 1984.

== Career ==
=== Early career ===
Doctoroff began his career as an investment banker, working for Lehman Brothers in New York City. He later became managing partner at Oak Hill Capital Partners, a private equity investment firm.

=== Olympic bid ===
In 1994, after attending a World Cup soccer match between Italy and Bulgaria, Doctoroff was inspired to bring such competition to New York City as host of the 2008 Olympic games. Largely unknown in political, sporting and business circles of New York, Doctoroff connected with political consultant Robert Teeter, under whom Doctoroff worked as a Republican political pollster while he was a student at Harvard. Through Teeter, Doctoroff met with the Metropolitan Transportation Authority, New York City Partnership, and then-mayor Rudy Giuliani and began to move forward with his plans to bring the Olympics to New York.

Although the U.S. Olympic Committee decided not to pursue a U.S. bid for the 2008 Olympic Games, Doctoroff continued his efforts and formed NYC2012, shifting his focus from the 2008 to the 2012 summer games. The NYC2012 plan called for construction of new stadiums, transportation improvements and environmental clean-up efforts. Although London was ultimately selected to host the 2012 summer games, Doctoroff's Olympic efforts helped catalyze longstanding infrastructure and development projects in New York such as the extension of the No. 7 subway line. As a result of his involvement with NYC2012, Doctoroff was asked to join the Bloomberg administration in late 2001 as deputy mayor for economic development and rebuilding.

=== Bloomberg administration ===
During his first term as deputy mayor, Doctoroff continued to focus on developing neglected areas of the cities through the Five-Borough Economic Opportunity Plan. In total, Doctoroff oversaw 290 separate projects and initiatives (280 of which were completed during his tenure), including the rezoning of 6,000 city blocks (including areas such as Hudson Yards, West Chelsea, 125th Street in Harlem, the South Bronx, Downtown Brooklyn, Greenpoint-Williamsburg, Long Island City, Jamaica, and Coney Island), the creation of 130 million square feet of residential and commercial space, and 2,400 acres of new parks, including the High Line, Brooklyn Bridge Park and Governor's Island. Doctoroff led the effort to use tax-increment financing to enable the City of New York to fund an extension of the #7 subway line to service Hudson Yards, enabling an expansion of the Manhattan central business district with new office space, housing (including 4,000 affordable units), and retail and hotel space. He also represented city interests in the redevelopment of Lower Manhattan after the devastation of 9/11, and led the Mayor’s Vision for Lower Manhattan, which resulted in a near doubling of the area’s population from 2000 to 2024. Doctoroff was responsible for initiatives to build the new Yankee Stadium, Citi Field, and the Barclays Center, and expand the campuses of Columbia University, New York University, and Fordham University. Doctoroff was also responsible for overseeing the creation of the New Marketplace Housing Plan, which developed or preserved 165,000 units of affordable housing.

Doctoroff conceived of and led the team that developed PlaNYC, the 127-point plan that brought together more than 25 City agencies to make New York City more environmentally sustainable. By 2010, the City reported that nearly all 127 initiatives had been launched. Carbon emissions decreased 18% by the end of Bloomberg's tenure, including a 25% reduction on city properties. The percentage of New Yorkers within a 10-minute walk of a park increased from 70% in 2007 to 99% in 2022, partly due to the opening of 296 schoolyards as playgrounds. The City planted one million trees, and over $327 million was invested in eight destination parks citywide. In December 2012, he argued the changes made as a result of PlaNYC helped prevent further damage to the city from Hurricane Sandy, particularly in areas designated as flood zones. One of the 127 points of the plan was the introduction of congestion pricing, which is a system of fees to discourage commuting by car. Supporters, including Doctoroff, anticipated that the fees would help finance mass transit system improvements, reduce greenhouse gas emissions by 30% citywide by 2030 and reduce traffic congestion. A study conducted by the Metropolitan Transportation Authority in 2007, however, revealed that subway lines were at capacity and could not accommodate an increase in new riders using the system. Congestion pricing was eventually dismissed by New York state legislators in April 2008, claiming the fee was unfair to middle-class commuters who did not have access to mass transit.

Congestion pricing for New York City was revived by the governor in 2017, adopted by the state legislature in 2019, and ultimately approved by the federal government in 2023.

=== Bloomberg L.P. ===
Doctoroff left city politics before the congestion pricing proposal failed and became president of Bloomberg L.P. in February 2008. Under Doctoroff's leadership, Bloomberg L.P. shifted its focus from providing financial information and analysis to its network of Terminal subscribers, to building a news organization targeted to a broader business audience. These efforts included the development of a strategy to increase the readership of Bloomberg.com, the acquisition of BusinessWeek and the creation of new subscription services Bloomberg Government, Bloomberg New Energy, and Bloomberg Law. During Doctoroff’s tenure, Bloomberg acquired BNA, later rebranded Bloomberg BNA and eventually Bloomberg Industry Group.

These efforts allowed Bloomberg L.P. to grow and diversify revenue. According to The New York Times, 85 percent of Bloomberg L.P.'s revenue comes from sales of its terminals, which then helps support the subscription-based news services. The news operation employs 2,300 journalists in 146 bureaus and 72 countries. In an interview with the American Journalism Review, Doctoroff describes a relationship where increasing the news audience helps increase the influence of the terminals and move the company closer to its goal of being "the most influential news organization in the world."

Under Doctoroff, Bloomberg L.P. surpassed rival Thomson Reuters in market share, grew revenue from $5.4 billion to $9 billion over his seven years, and started to expand operations in countries with emerging markets, like hedge funds in Korea. In the wake of the Libor scandal, Doctoroff told the European Parliament that Bloomberg LP could develop an alternative index called the Bloomberg Interbank Offered Rate that would address regulators' concerns.

Doctoroff left Bloomberg L.P. in 2014, with Michael Bloomberg re-assuming the role of CEO.

=== Sidewalk Labs ===
In 2015, Doctoroff and Google formed a start-up called Sidewalk Labs, focused on developing technology to improve urban life. Doctoroff is the CEO, and Alphabet (Google's holding company) is funding the company.

In 2017 Sidewalk Labs announced a plan to lead the redevelopment of a 12 acres (0.049 km^{2}) parcel of land on Toronto's waterfront, equipping the parcel with the latest innovations in technology for connecting people and urban design to create a more sustainable and affordable community. The plan triggered some controversy, when first announced, and much greater controversy when Sidewalk Labs suggested expanding its footprint to a much larger parcel under redevelopment. Critics voiced fears that residents and passersby would not realize how much privacy they were abandoning by entering the parcel. Doctoroff announced that Sidewalk Labs was dropping their plans on May 7, 2020.

During his time at Sidewalk Labs, the company launched several companies, including: Replica, Sidewalk Infrastructure Partners, CityBlock Health, Pebble, Mesa, and Delve.

In December 2021, Doctoroff announced he was resigning as CEO as a result of developing symptoms that align with amyotrophic lateral sclerosis (ALS), from which his father and uncle died. Doctors would later confirm the diagnosis of ALS, a neurodegenerative disease.

=== The Shed ===
In 2013, Doctoroff became President and Chairman of a non-profit organization created to build a new arts facility at Hudson Yards, originally known as Culture Shed. During his term as Deputy Mayor, Doctoroff led the process of site preservation for what became known as The Shed as part of the redevelopment of Manhattan's Far West Side. Doctoroff also led efforts to raise $636 million for the Shed's construction and launch, was founding chairman of the board, oversaw the construction of the building, and led the search to recruit Alex Poots as the Shed's first CEO and artistic director. The Shed opened in 2019.

In 2023 in the wake of his diagnosis of ALS, Doctoroff stepped down as chairman of the board of directors of The Shed. The institution has renamed its primary entrance as The Dan Doctoroff Lobby, and in 2024 named him the inaugural recipient of the Dan Doctoroff Disruptor Award.

=== TargetALS ===
In 2013, Doctoroff founded Target ALS, a medical research foundation, with Bloomberg Philanthropies and David Rubenstein, following the death of Doctoroff's father and uncle from Amyotrophic Lateral Sclerosis. He donated $10 million of his personal wealth to the foundation. Target ALS has funded Cambridge biotech Biogen's clinical trials of an experimental drug purchased from Karyopharm Therapeutics in 2018. In late 2021, Doctoroff announced his own diagnosis with ALS, stating that he would "dedicate my life to battling this disease," beginning with a new $250 million fundraising effort.

In 2024, Target ALS announced that the organization had achieved the $250 million goal, bringing Doctoroff’s total funds raised since inception to more than $350 million. Since its creation the organization’s efforts have led to the launch of 7 clinical trials and dozens of drug discovery programs over the last decade. Additionally, 60% of Target ALS-funded consortia have led to drug discovery programs, and 5 biotech companies have spun out from this work.

Also in 2024, the Cold Spring Harbor Laboratory awarded Doctoroff and his wife Alisa, also a board member of Target ALS, the 2024 Double Helix Medals in recognition of their contributions to science research.

Also in 2024, ALS United Greater NY honored Doctoroff with the Jacob K. Javits Lifetime Achievement Award.

== Other activities ==
In 2015, the Municipal Art Society awarded Doctoroff its Jacqueline Kennedy Onassis Medal, which is awarded annually to individuals who, through vision, leadership, and philanthropy, have made an extraordinary contribution to New York City.

In March 2015, Doctoroff was appointed to the United States Olympic Committee board of directors.

In September 2017, Doctoroff's book Greater Than Ever: New York's Big Comeback, was published by PublicAffairs/Hachette Book Group.

Doctoroff was a member of the advisory board for Neom, Saudi Arabia's plan to build a futuristic "mega city" in the desert.

Doctoroff was included in 2024 Time's most influential people in health list.

In 2024, the Citizens Budget Commission awarded Doctoroff its Felix G. Rohatyn Award, which is given to an individual whose career exemplifies Felix Rohatyn’s public service and commitment to New York.

== Personal life ==
After meeting at Harvard during their first year, Doctoroff married Alisa Robbins in 1981. He is Jewish, and in 2013 Alisa Robbins Doctoroff was appointed the president of the UJA-Federation of New York; previously she was president of Congregation Or Zarua in Manhattan. The couple has three children and resides in New York City.

In December 2021, Doctoroff announced he likely had ALS at the age of 63. He has since worked to raise money for research into the disease.

Doctoroff is a second cousin of The New York Times domestic correspondent Katherine Rosman. His grandmother, Jennie Miller née Seeman, (1906-1992) was a sister of Rosman's grandmother, Mae Rosman née Seeman (1917-1987).
