= Congregation Or Zarua =

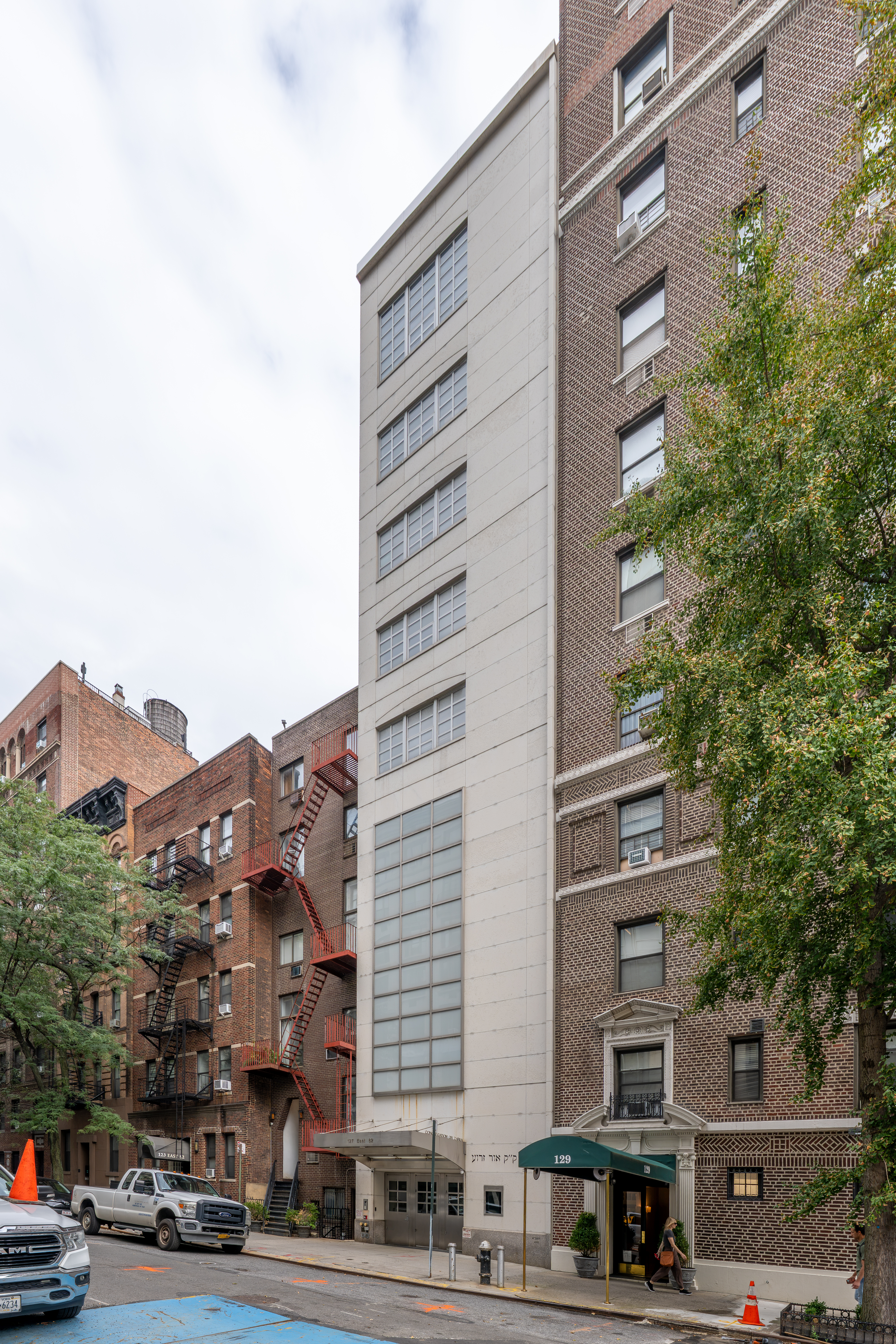

- Location on Upper East Side in Manhattan

Religion
- Affiliation: Conservative Judaism
- Ecclesiastical or organisational status: Synagogue
- Leadership: Rabbi Scott N. Bolton; Rabbi Harlan Wechsler, Emeritus
- Status: Active

Location
- Location: 127 East 82nd Street, Upper East Side, Manhattan, New York City, New York
- Country: United States
- Coordinates: 40°46′37.95″N 73°57′27.99″W

Architecture
- Founder: Rabbi Dr. Harlan J. Wechsler
- Established: 1989 (as a congregation)
- Completed: 1993 (first building); 2003 (second building)

Website
- orzarua.org

Congregation Or Zarua is a Conservative synagogue located on the Upper East Side of Manhattan in New York City. It was founded in 1989 by Rabbi Harlan J. Wechsler and a group of fewer than two dozen congregants. The congregation completed construction of its current building in 2002. It is led by Rabbi Scott N. Bolton and has a membership of approximately 325 families.

== History ==
Or Zarua, whose name is derived from Psalm 97:11 (“Light is sown for the righteous and joy for the upright of heart”), was founded in 1989 by a group of fewer than two dozen congregants led by Rabbi Harlan J. Wechsler. The congregation held its first service on January 28, 1989, at the 92nd Street Y in Manhattan. Services were conducted monthly until after the High Holy Days of that year. The synagogue's office and Talmud class were located at 1384 Lexington Avenue, across the street from the 92nd Street Y.

In 1993, after outgrowing its temporary facilities, Or Zarua purchased the former Waldensian Evangelical Church at 127 East 82nd Street and renovated it for use as a synagogue. The first service in the building took place in May 1993. The structure was originally constructed in the early 1880s as a synagogue for Congregation Kehilath Jeshurun. It was sold in 1904 and subsequently used by several congregations until 1950, when it was acquired by the Waldensian Evangelical Church. At the time of its sale to Or Zarua, it was the only remaining Waldensian congregation in New York City.

Or Zarua occupied the refurbished building for five years before beginning construction of a new synagogue on the same site. The new building, whose sanctuary is featured in Henri Stoltzman's book Synagogue Architecture in America, was dedicated in spring 2003.

As of 2011, Congregation Or Zarua offered a daily minyan, weekly Friday night and Saturday morning Shabbat services, and services for Jewish festivals and holidays. The congregation also hosted educational, artistic, and musical programs, including art exhibitions in its social hall, weekly Talmud classes, lectures on topics of Jewish interest, and performances by an in-house klezmer band. Membership at that time was approximately 325 families.

== Hebrew school ==
The congregation established its Hebrew school in 1990 as an afternoon program located at the Nightingale-Bamford School on East 92nd Street. The school remained at that site until the congregation opened its own building in 2003. The Hebrew school serves children ages 5 to 18 from congregational families and operates from September through May, with students attending once or twice weekly. Approximately two-thirds of the congregation's children are enrolled in the Hebrew school, while the remaining third attend private Jewish day schools in the area.

== Religious leadership ==
Or Zarua is led by Rabbi Scott N. Bolton, the congregation's second rabbi. A graduate of American University, he was ordained by the Ziegler School of Rabbinic Studies at the University of Judaism (now American Jewish University). Before entering rabbinical school, Bolton worked in Washington, D.C. for the International Association of Fire Chiefs. He studied at Hebrew Union College in Jerusalem and Yeshivat Nahalat Rachel and was part of the first full-time class at the Ziegler School of Rabbinic Studies. Bolton has authored educational materials on ethics and Jewish texts and previously led two Solomon Schechter schools. He holds a certificate in informal Zionist education from the Melitz Institute in Jerusalem.

The congregation's founding rabbi, Harlan J. Wechsler, is a graduate of Harvard College and was ordained at the Jewish Theological Seminary of America, where he also earned a Ph.D. He taught Jewish ethics and the history of Jewish thought at the seminary for more than thirty years. Wechsler is the author of What’s So Bad About Guilt (1990) and has served in leadership roles with The Hospital Chaplaincy. He has also hosted a national radio program on Jewish teaching.
