= Control Group =

US consultancy firm

Control Group Inc.
- Company type: Private
- Industry: Technology; Software Development; Network Engineering
- Founded: 2001
- Founder: Campbell Hyers; Scott Anderson; Colin O'Donnell
- Fate: Merged with Titan to form Intersection, acquired by a consortium of investors led by Sidewalk Labs
- Headquarters: New York City, New York
- Website: controlgroup.com

Control Group was a technology and design consultancy firm, founded in 2001 in Lower Manhattan, New York City, by Campbell Hyers, Scott Anderson, and Colin O'Donnell.

On June 23, 2015, Control Group and advertising firm Titan announced their merger into one company, known as Intersection, and acquisition by a consortium of investors led by Sidewalk Labs, a subsidiary of Google.

== Notable work ==
Control Group managed creative technology projects from concept design to production and implementation/installation, in addition to support of IT infrastructure.

- New York City Subway "On the Go!" wayfinding kiosks

The company's partnership with the Metropolitan Transportation Authority has resulted in the planned deployment of anywhere from 47 to 90 digital wayfinding "On the Go!" kiosks to stations throughout the New York City Subway system in 2013. Control Group is designing the platform to deliver real-time information such as route lookup, countdown to train arrivals, and service alerts.

- Kate Spade's Japanese flagship store Saturday

Control Group developed an iPad based system to replace paper signage for things like sizing charts, style videos, and in-store offers. The platform may later power point of sale, employee training, shopping analytics, and supply chain management in a later iteration.

- Reinvent Payphones design challenge

The company was selected by New York City for the Community Impact Award, in collaboration with Titan, for their submission to the Reinvent Payphones Design Challenge, a competition that welcomed input from hundreds of urban designers, planners, technologists and policy experts to imagine the future of the New York City's 11,000 public pay telephones. The prototype proposed open access to real-time data and a distribution platform for community, civic, arts, and commercial apps and messaging.

- Walker Digital Perfect Pay Baccarat and Smart Table Network

Control Group worked with Walker Digital Table Systems to integrate RFID technology to eliminates losses in the casino game Baccarat due to miscalculated payouts and counterfeit chips. The table transmits real-time data to the Smart Table Network, a networked system to maximize dealer performance and provide insights into customer behavior. The tables have been widely adopted by the Asian gaming market, most notably at the world's largest casino, Resorts World Genting in Malaysia. Perfect Pay and Smart Baccarat Table Network were both awarded Gold Awards for Most Innovative Gaming Technology Products by Casino Journal at the 2009 Gaming Technology Summit.

== Awards and publications ==
- White House Redux: 123 Ideas for a New White House
- Crain's Best Places to Work 2012
- Reinvent Payphones Design Challenge Community Impact Award
- Control Group 2013 Retail Technology Survey
