= Sidewalk Labs =

Urban innovation subsidiary of Google

Sidewalk Labs LLC
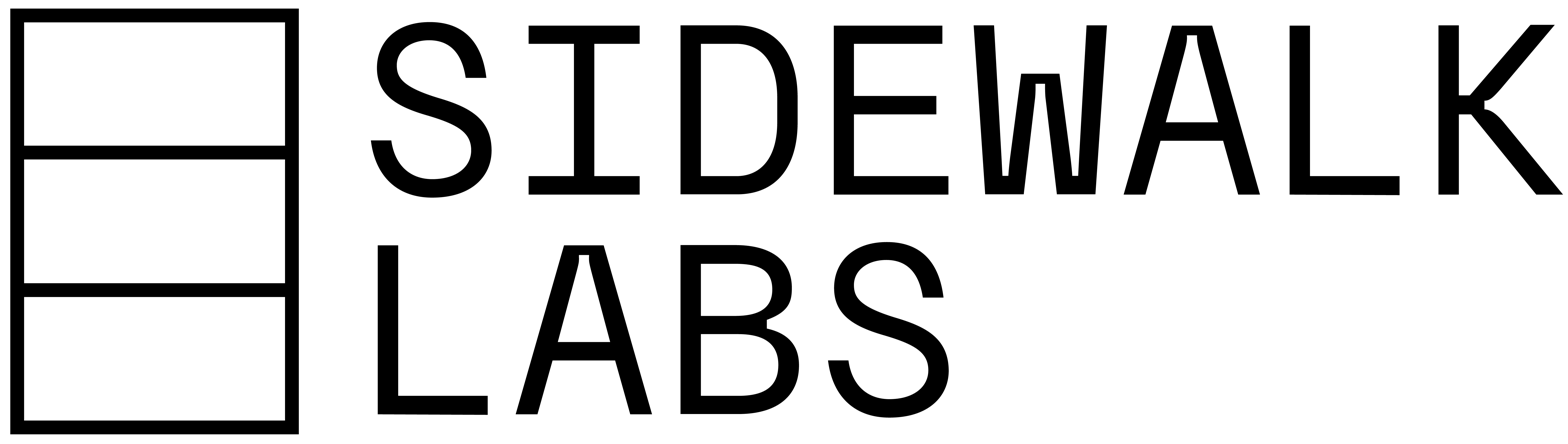
- Type: Subsidiary
- Industry: Urban planning, infrastructure
- Founded: June 10, 2015; 11 years ago
- Defunct: December 2021
- Fate: Absorbed into Google
- Headquarters: New York, NY, U.S.
- Key people: Daniel L. Doctoroff (former chairman & CEO); Craig Nevill-Manning (CTO)
- Parent: Alphabet Inc. (2015–2021); Google LLC (2021)
- Website: sidewalklabs.com

Sidewalk Labs LLC was an urban planning and infrastructure subsidiary of Google. Its stated goal was to improve urban infrastructure through technological solutions, and tackle issues such as cost of living, efficient transportation and energy usage.

The company was headed by Daniel L. Doctoroff, former Deputy Mayor of New York City for economic development and former chief executive of Bloomberg L.P. until 2021. Other notable employees include Craig Nevill-Manning, co-founder of Google's New York office and inventor of Froogle, Rohit Aggarwala, who served as chief policy officer of the company and was later Commissioner of the New York City Department of Environmental Protection, and future New York State Assemblyman Micah Lasher, who was Head of Policy and Communications for Sidewalk Labs. It was originally part of Alphabet Inc., Google's parent company, before being absorbed into Google in December 2021 following Doctoroff's departure from the company.

== Projects ==
=== Sidewalk Toronto ===
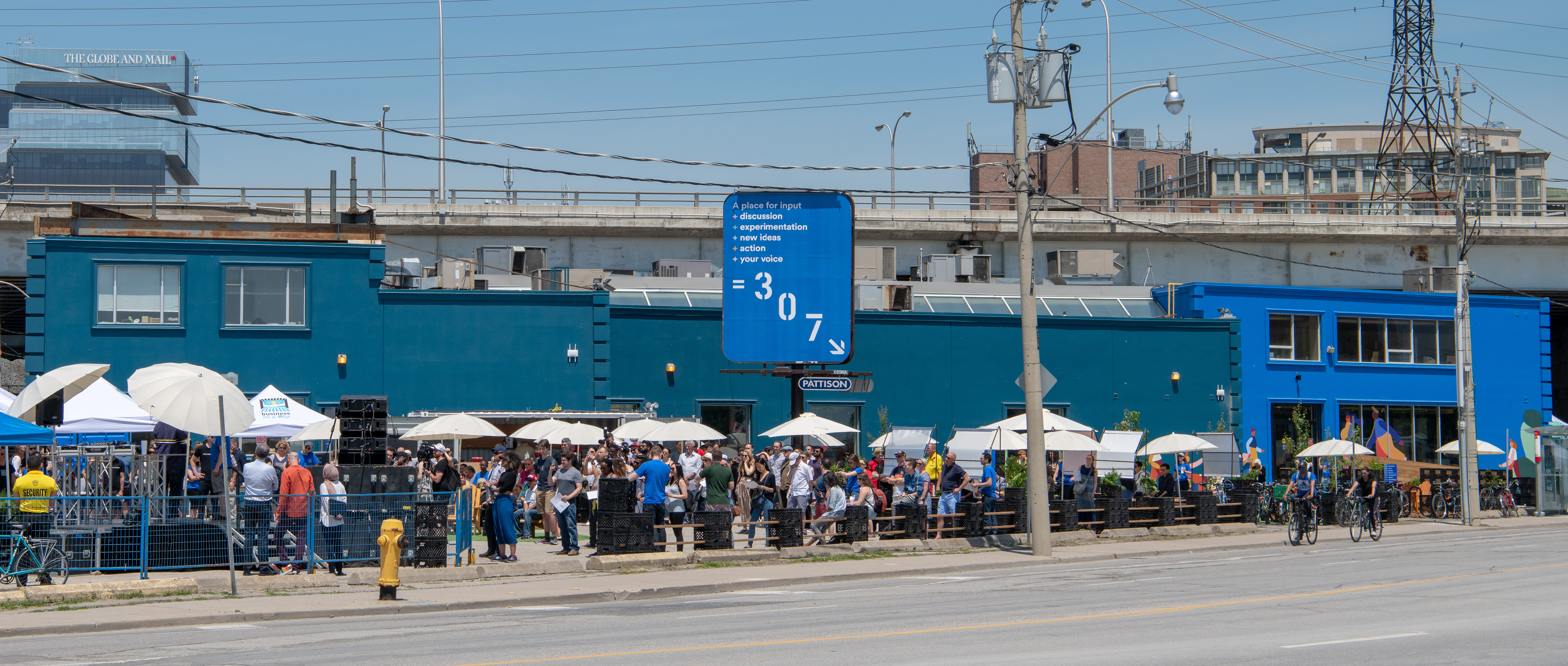
An open house at Sidewalk Labs' Toronto office, called "307"

In April 2016, The Information reported that Sidewalk intended to create a new city in the United States to test design ideas prior to real world implementation. Sidewalk did not confirm that report, but has said it had engaged in thought experiments about what it could be like to develop a community "from the internet up."

In October 2017, Sidewalk Labs announced plans to develop Quayside, a 12-acre (4.9 ha) neighborhood in Toronto, Ontario, Canada, in response to a competition organized by Waterfront Toronto. Branded as Sidewalk Toronto, the project aimed to become "a testbed for emerging technologies, materials and processes" to address issues such as sustainability, accessibility, inclusiveness and prosperity in urban communities. The initiative was also envisioned to be scaled up across Toronto's Port Lands, an 800-acre (320 ha) area that is one of the largest areas of underdeveloped urban land in North America. The project progressed slowly with ongoing consultation from the public.

In 2018, the company opened a new Toronto office and began holding weekend open houses in which visitors from the public contributed their ideas to the development of the Sidewalk Toronto project. In 2019, Sidewalk Labs said it had consulted thousands of Torontonians for its development plans. However, representatives of Waterfront Toronto's Digital Strategy Advisory Panel (DSAP) said that Sidewalk Labs's projects contained too much "tech for tech's sake."

In May 2020, the project was abandoned. Sidewalk Labs officially cited the economic uncertainty posed by the COVID-19 pandemic as the reason. However, the project had faced significant challenges pre-dating the pandemic, including privacy and data governance concerns.

=== Development Advisory Services ===
Sidewalk Labs offered advisory services for real estate developers to use technology to meet environmental, affordability, and equity goals. Sidewalk Labs advised on the following four projects:

- Mana Wynwood — a 23.5–acre project in Miami that will serve as a trade center between Latin America and China and an arts and entertainment center
- Downtown Summerlin — a 300–acre mixed-use development with minimalized parking in Las Vegas
- The Power Station — a 29–acre mixed-use residential community on the waterfront in San Francisco at the site of a former electrical plant
- Vancouver Innovation Center — conversion of a 180–acre industrial manufacturing site into a mixed-use residential and commercial community in the Portland/Vancouver area

=== Traffic flow in the United States ===
In early 2016, Sidewalk Labs began working with ten cities which participated in the U.S. Department of Transportation's "Smart Cities Challenge" to help cities better understand daily street activity through the use of real-time data. The Challenge attracted dozens of medium-sized cities across the US to compete for $40 million in federal funding along with an additional $10 million from the Paul G. Allen Family Foundation to assess road data gathered from smartphones to analyze congestion and other traffic conditions, and develop a transportation coordination platform to improve the efficiency of road, parking, and transit use. The winner, Columbus, Ohio, was announced in June 2016.

== Products ==
- Mesa, launched in September 2020, is a tool to help commercial buildings use energy more efficiently.
- Delve, launched in October 2020, was a tool to help developers, architects and urban designers discover optimal design choices for neighborhood projects. The tool was disabled on May 4, 2026, and some of its features integrated into Google Earth.
- Pebble, launched in May 2021, is a tool to help manage parking in cities.

== Investments and portfolio companies ==
Sidewalk Labs invested in and incubated companies which developed tools that could support Sidewalk Labs initiatives and scale to cities around the world.

=== Intersection and Link ===
In June 2015, Sidewalk Labs led a group of investors in the acquisition of Control Group and Titan forming a new company called Intersection. Intersection works in cities and public spaces to offer internet connectivity, information, and content.

=== Cityblock ===
Cityblock Health was spun-out of Sidewalk Labs in 2017. Its goal is to improve health care for low-income people with difficult medical needs. It employs over 500 people and has patients in three US states and Washington, DC.

=== Coord ===
In 2018, Sidewalk Labs introduced a spin-off Coord, a company focused on providing RESTful APIs for accessing information like routing, bike share details, toll information, and curbside details. In October 2018, Coord raised an additional $5 million to continue building products.

=== Replica ===
Replica is an AI-powered data platform which helps cities make operational or infrastructural changes in response to changes in population behaviors. It began as a project at Sidewalk Labs in 2017 and was spun out as an independent company in 2019.

=== Sidewalk Infrastructure Partners (SIP) ===
Sidewalk Infrastructure Partners (SIP) was spun-off from Sidewalk Labs in 2019 to develop technologies that modernize infrastructure such as recycling, waste disposal and transportation in communities throughout the United States.

=== Ori ===
Sidewalk Labs invested in Boston-based robotic home interior design company Ori in 2019.

=== Nico ===
The Neighborhood Investment Company (Nico) allows local residents to make small, long-term real estate investments in their own neighborhoods. Sidewalk Labs invested in Nico at the end of 2019.

=== VoltServer ===
In late 2019, Sidewalk Labs invested in VoltServer, which strives to "make electricity safe" and overlays data on electricity distribution.

== The Yellow Book ==
Sidewalk Labs created a book detailing their broad ranging vision to transform cities that would inspire employees known as The Yellow Book. It contained aspirational designs of a futurist city run on its technology. In the book, the company proposed expanding its scope to include the power to levy taxes, control public services such as schools, roads, and public transportation, collect data on the current and past locations of all members of the community, and to help redesign the local criminal justice system. The book also described a social credit system to reward "good behavior", a system which has been compared by some to the one used in China. Sidewalk's proposed system also included rewards for sharing personal data.

The book also included the potential real estate profitability of such investments, containing theoretical proposals for communities in Detroit, Denver, and Alameda, California. The company has described this book as a "wide-ranging brainstorming process", and stated that most of its ideas were never considered for the Toronto project with many being very fantastical in nature and others being reminiscent of the Netflix series Black Mirror.
