= Vernon Bayley Wadsworth =

- Born: c. 1842; Weston, Canada West
- Died: 1940 (aged 97–98); Toronto, Ontario, Canada
- Known for: prominent surveyor, lawyer, railway director, banker

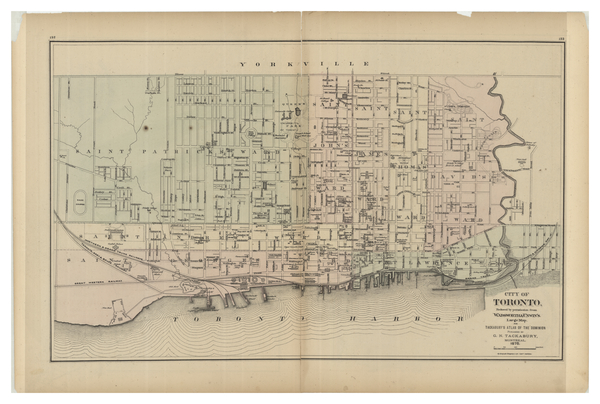
City of Toronto, reduced by permission from Wadsworth & Unwin's Large Map for Tackabury's Atlas of the Dominion published by G.N. Tackabury, Montreal, 1875.

Vernon Bayley Wadsworth was a surveyor in the province of Ontario. Wadsworth was born into a family in Weston, Canada West, who owned mills on the Humber River. Wadsworth was also a lawyer, and a director of the London and Canada Loan and Agency Company.

In 1868 Wadsworth entered into a partnership with Charles Unwin, another surveyor who had apprenticed under John Stoughton Dennis. Both men had worked on the surveying of Muskoka County.

Wadsworth played a role in the management of both the Grand Trunk Railway and the Canadian Pacific Railway.
