= International Marine Passenger Terminal =

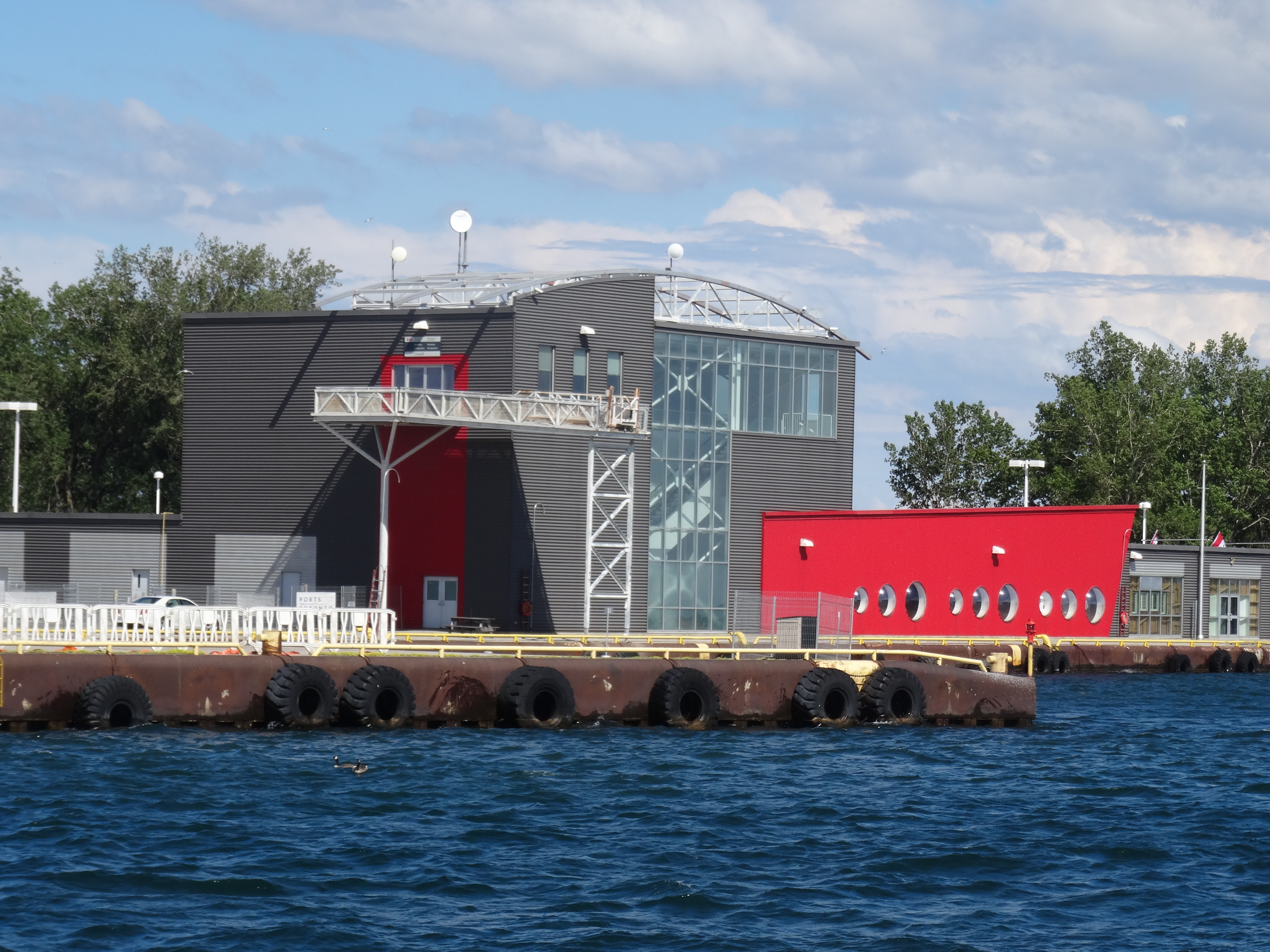
- Exterior of the International Marine Passenger Terminal from the Toronto Harbour
- Interactive map of International Marine Passenger Terminal

Location
- Country: Canada
- Location: Port of Toronto, Port Lands, Toronto, Ontario
- Coordinates: 43.63472°N 79.34917°W

Details
- Opened: 2005
- Owned by: PortsToronto

Statistics
- Vessel arrivals: 34 (2024)
- Passenger traffic: 18,000
- Website www.portstoronto.com/cruise-ships.aspx

International Marine Passenger Terminal is a cruise ship passenger terminal located in the Port of Toronto at 8 Unwin Avenue in Port Lands, Toronto, Ontario, Canada. The facility is operated by PortsToronto.

== History ==
The terminal was opened in 2005. It was originally built to accommodate The Spirit of Ontario I, a water-jet powered big catamaran fast ferry that was to make several round trips per day between Toronto, Ontario and Rochester, New York, but the ferry service only ran for a total of six months. The Rochester firm that owned and operated the ferry had a 14-year lease on the use of the terminal that would have paid the City of Toronto $250,000 per year. The lease was terminated in December 2009 after payment of a $90,000 settlement.

Since the demise of the fast ferry service, PortsToronto has been promoting Toronto as a cruise ship destination. Cruise ships that serve American and European tourists travelling on the Great Lakes between May and October are making increasing use of the terminal as a port of call over the summer months. Indeed cruise passenger volumes at a variety of Great Lakes ports, which cumulatively had 100,000 passengers in 2018, increased between 2015 and 2019 reflecting increased touring on the Great Lakes.

== Terminal building ==
The terminal is a two-storey building which has 38,000 square feet (3,500 m^{2}) of floor space and can deploy an adjustable passenger ramp from the second storey. The terminal facility is reported to have cost either CA$8 million or CA$10.4 million to construct.

The terminal building is also regularly used as a film location. For its three years in production, the CBC drama The Border used the customs facilities of the terminal as the headquarters of an elite customs and border squad. Renting the terminal for filming costs $3,500 per day.

== Traffic ==
Cruise ships that have made multiple ports of call over the last few years include the 420 passenger MS Hamburg, the 180 passenger MV Le Champlain and the 210 passenger MV Victory I. On October 14, 2019, the terminal processed a record 988 people when the Hamburg, the Le Champlain, and their passengers and crew docked on the same day.

Annual passenger traffic
Year	Vessel calls	Total passengers	Year over year growth rate
2012	4	690	—
2013	9	2,900	▲320%
2014	6	3,000	▲3.3%
2015	13	5,000	▲66%
2016	7	2,400	▼ -52%
2017	16	5,600	▲133%
2018	17	6,000	▲7.1%
2019	36	12,000	▲100%
2020	— (Note: The federal government suspended the 2020 and 2021 cruise ship seasons during the COVID-19 pandemic.)	—	—
2021	—	—	—
2022	40	13,000	▲8.3%
2023	45	18,000	▲38%
2024	34	18,000	0%
