= Cherry Beach =

Park in Toronto, Canada

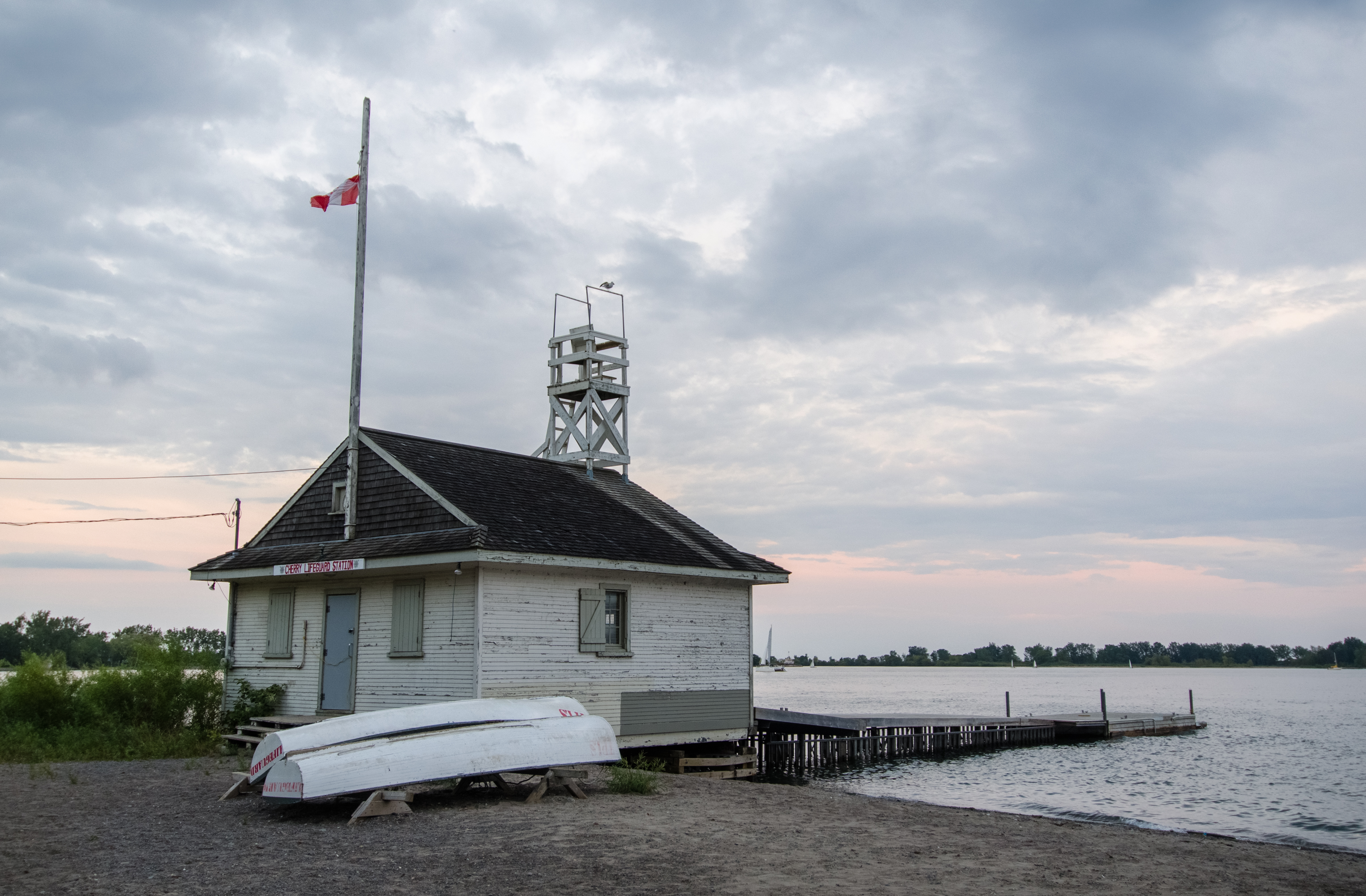
- The life guard station on Cherry Beach
- Interactive map of Cherry Beach
- Type: Public beach
- Location: Toronto, Ontario
- Coordinates: 43°38′13″N 79°20′40″W
- Created: 1930s
- Operator: Toronto Parks

Cherry Beach (originally Clarke Beach Park) is a lakeside beach park located at the foot of Cherry Street just south of Unwin Avenue in Toronto, Ontario, Canada. It is on Toronto's outer harbour just east of the Eastern Gap. It was once connected with Toronto Islands as part of the former peninsula before 1852 and later as sandbar (also referred to as Fisherman’s Island).

Despite its location at the tip of Toronto's formerly heavily industrial Port Lands area, Cherry Beach is a popular gathering place. There is no boardwalk and much of the surrounding areas is marshland or leftover grounds from what was once commercial industry and factory grounds. Recently the park has undergone improvements which includes a paved entrance way and a renovated washroom and swimming change room facilities. It has change rooms for bathers and barbecue areas for picnickers. It also has an off-leash area for dog walkers. The Martin Goodman Trail passes through the park.

In summer, the beach water is generally calm, and slightly warmer than other Toronto beaches along the lake shore, as its shallow water is sheltered by the Leslie Street Spit from direct surges of Lake Ontario.

== History ==
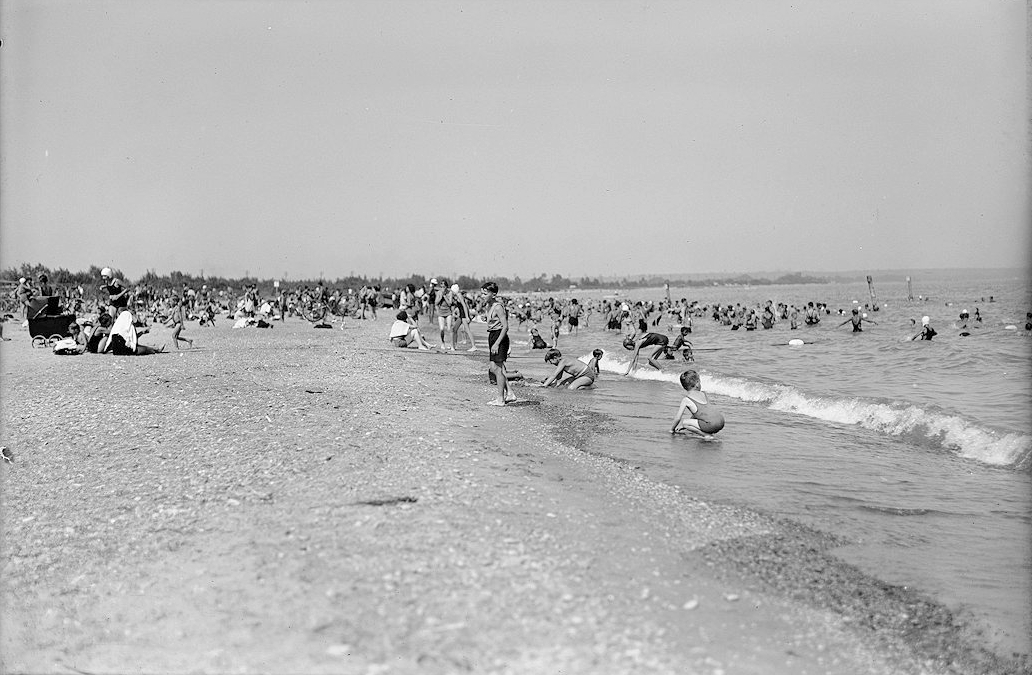
Bathers at Cherry Beach prior to construction of Leslie Street spit, 1935

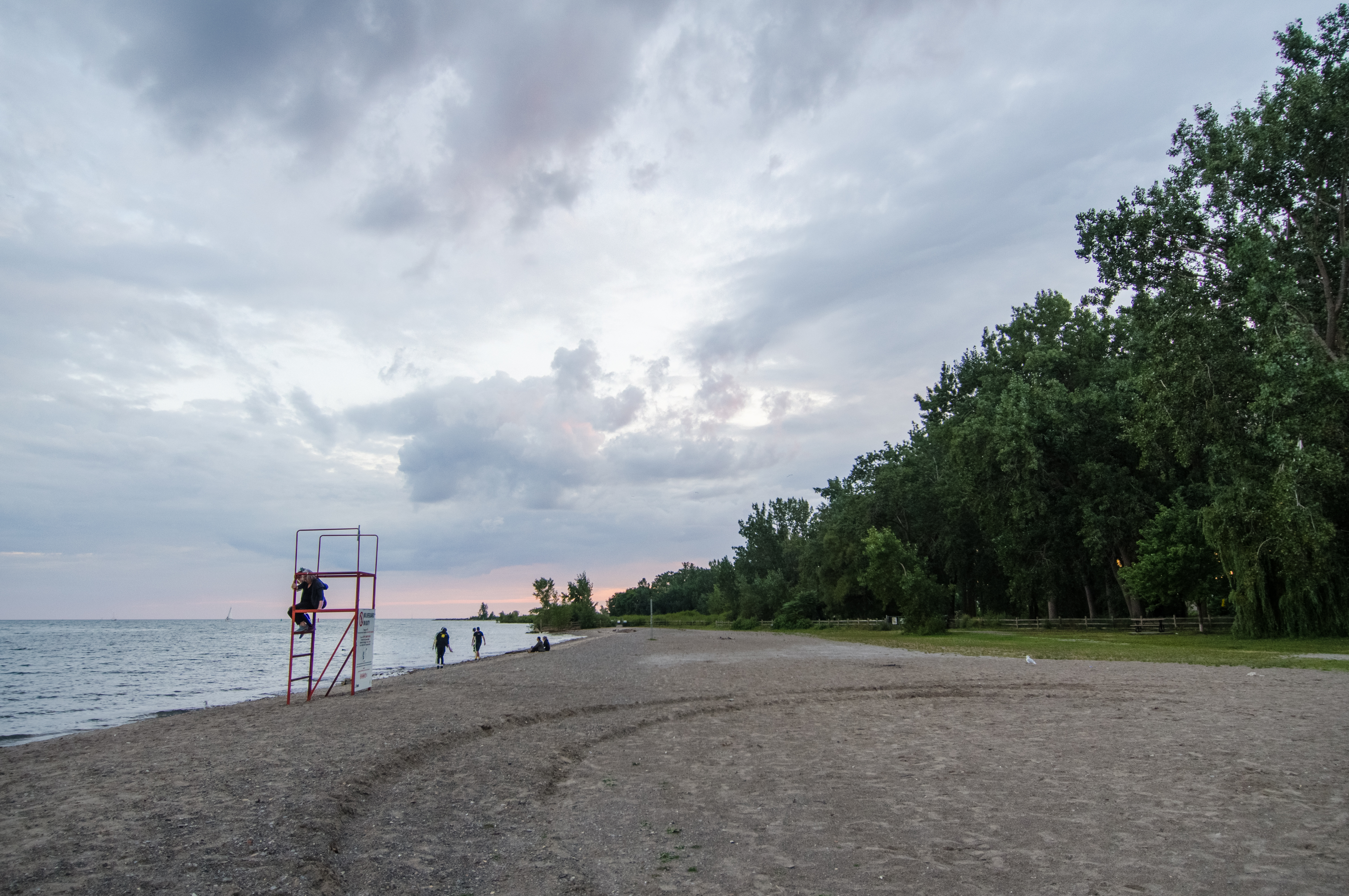
Martin Goodman Trail passes through Cherry Beach Park between the beach and wooded areas

The area that comprises Cherry Beach today was originally a marsh and sandbar that has been land filled. It was a place of spiritual significance for many indigenous people.

In the 1850s, settlers established a community in the area. The area was called Fisherman's Island and included a commercial fishery and church. People would travel to and from the mainland of Toronto by boat or across a breakwater that was built in 1882.

The beach park was originally named Clarke Beach Park after Harry Clarke, an alderman who was responsible for creating the park in the early 1930s. In 1974, the Toronto's Central Waterfront Planning proposed to eliminate Cherry Beach for industrial use. In 2003, the city officially renamed it to Cherry Beach which was already the common name among locals. In 2020, a group of local residents issued a collective statement criticizing a feasibility study by Waterfront Toronto which considered providing water taxis access to the beach.

=== Ecology ===
For many years it was one of the few Toronto beaches that was clean enough for swimming, windsurfing and kitesurfing; It typically meets high water quality, environmental and safety standards; however, a 2012 environmental assessment found that the concentration of lead and zinc in the soil at Cherry Beach is above guidelines, which is attributed to previous industrial use of the area. The only other major stands of cottonwoods in the Toronto area beyond the Toronto Islands are located at Cherry Beach.

=== Cherry Beach Sports Fields ===
A wooded area by the beach has been turned into soccer fields, children's play structure and a metered parking area.

In 2006 a pair of soccer fields were completed on land that had formerly been part of the greenbelt, at 275 Unwin Avenue. The fields were surfaced in astroturf and built to FIFA standards, and games of the 2007 FIFA Jr championship were to be played there. During the environmental assessment the site was found to be heavily contaminated by heavy metals, hydrocarbons and PCBs. The soccer field was described as a "transitional" facility, as most of the land on either side of Unwin was underutilized city land that could be repurposed to sport facilities even though it was contaminated.

Toronto FC used the soccer pitches for practice while their own dedicated training facilities were being constructed at Downsview Park.

== In popular culture ==
- Toronto's The All-Night Show ran a 1981 contest that involved giving clues to a treasure hunt. One clue pointed to Cherry Beach, and unexpectedly hundreds of viewers turned up and started digging up the beach looking for treasure. The police had to be called to stop it before the beach was totally ruined.
- Pukka Orchestra had a local radio hit in 1984 with the song "Cherry Beach Express." The song's name is a euphemism for the alleged police brutality committed on gay, indigenous, and homeless people at the beach between the 1940s and 1990s. The Toronto police tried to have the song banned.
- Parts of the music video for the Alessia Cara song "Wild Things" were filmed at Cherry Beach.
- Parts of the film Silent Hill: Revelation 3D were filmed at Cherry Beach.
- Toronto punk band Career Suicide named a 2008 EP after Cherry Beach.

== See also ==
- Port Lands
- Waterfront Trail
