= Charles Unwin =

- Born: 1829; Mansfield, England
- Died: 1918 (aged -1–0); Toronto, Ontario, Canada
- Known for: prominent surveyor

Charles Unwin (b.1829 d.1918-01-05) was a prominent surveyor for the Government of Ontario and the City of Toronto government. Unwin was born in the United Kingdom, and emigrated to Toronto in 1843, and lived with his uncle—also named Charles Unwin. Unwin attended the prestigious Upper Canada College, a private high school attended by many of the leading elements of Ontario's administration. After graduation, he apprenticed with John Stoughton Dennis, completing his apprenticeship in 1852. He spent the next nine years surveying Muskoka County.

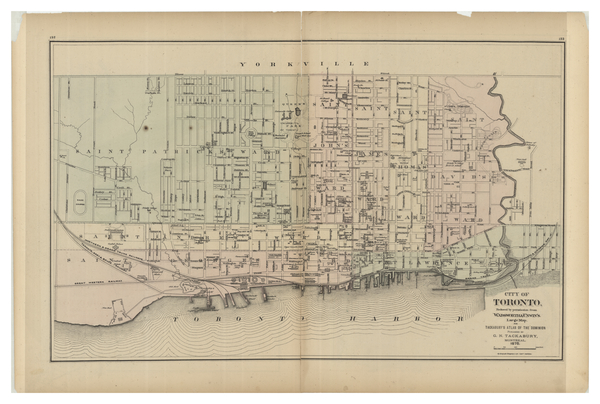
City of Toronto, reduced by permission from Wadsworth & Unwin's Large Map for Tackabury's Atlas of the Dominion published by G.N. Tackabury, Montreal, 1875.

Unwin entered into a partnership with Vernon Bayley Wadsworth in 1868.

In 1910 the association of Ontario Land Surveyors published Unwin's 12 page autobiographical sketch.

Unwin never married. He worked as a surveyor for Toronto from 1874 to his death, at 88 in 1918.

Unwin Avenue, the southernmost street in Toronto's Portlands, is named after Unwin.
