= Port Lands =

- Neighbourhood
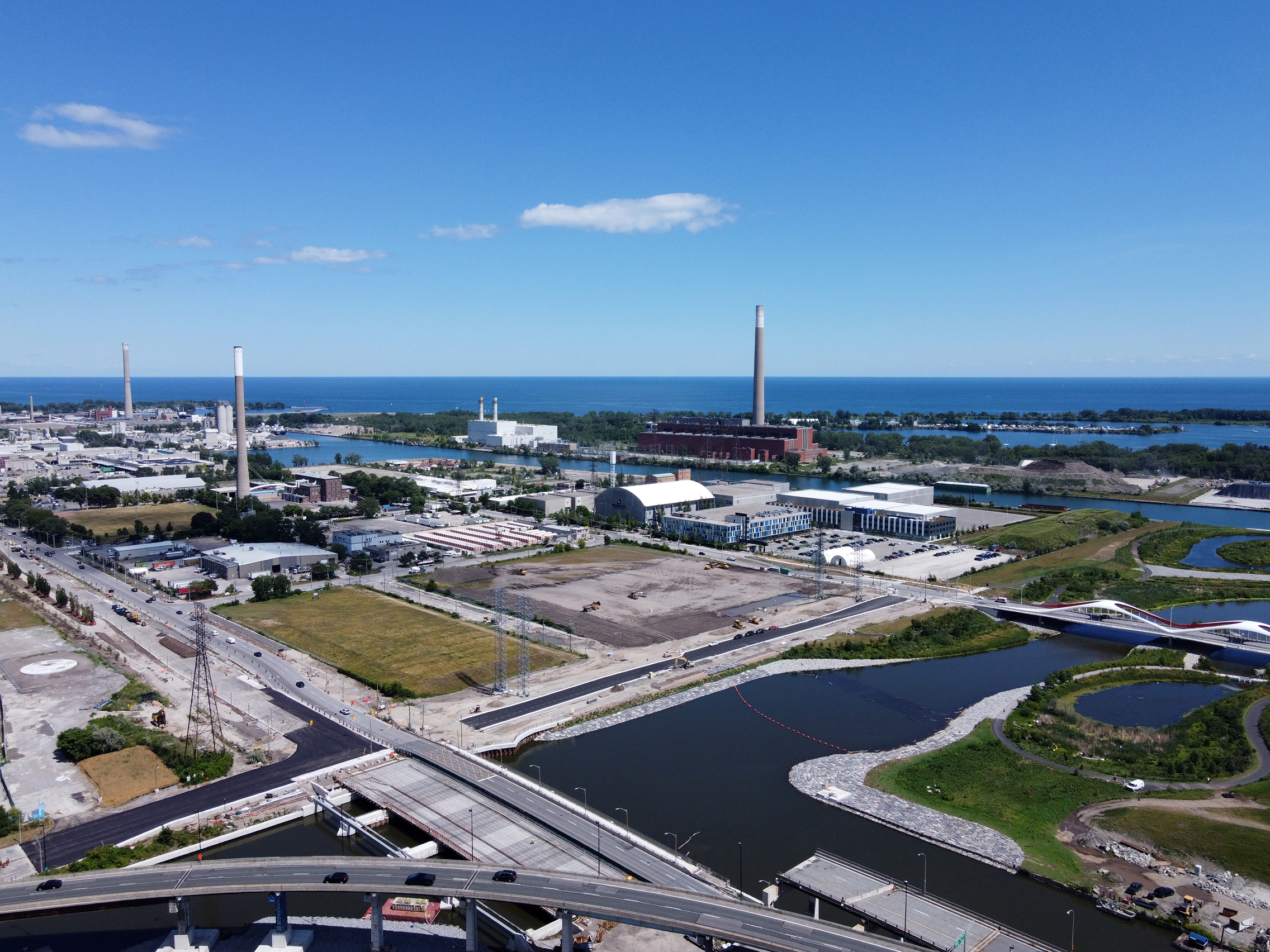
- View of the Port Lands from West Don Lands in 2025

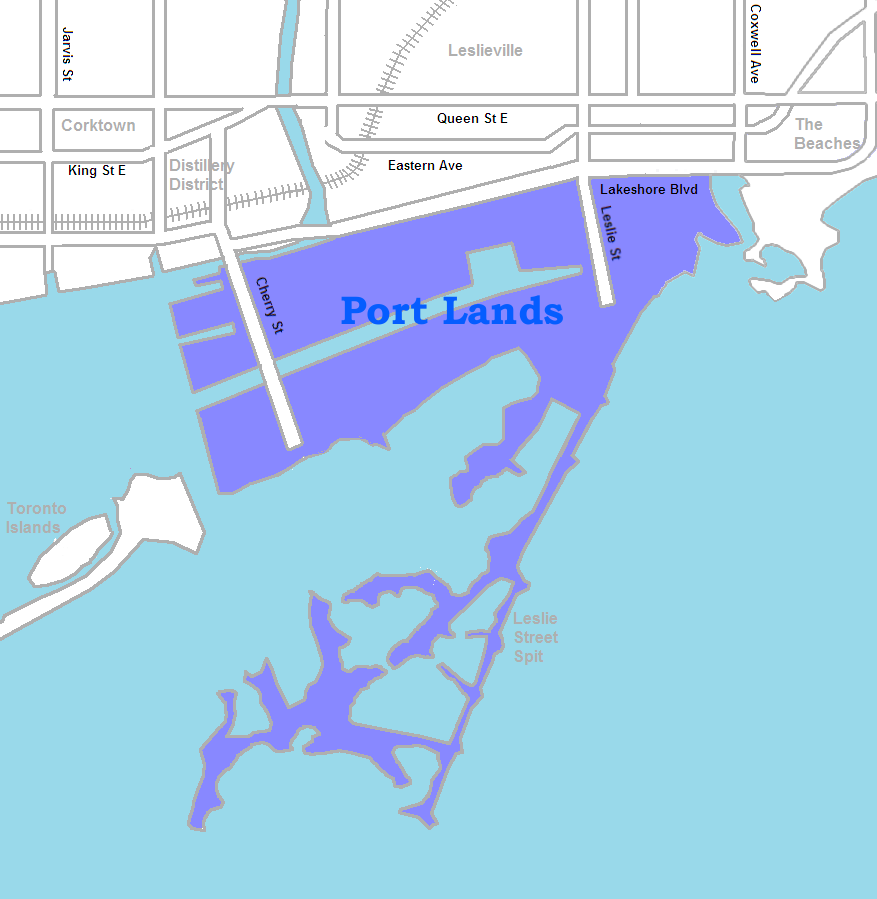
- Vicinity

- Location within Toronto
- Coordinates: 43°38′53″N 79°20′18″W
- Country: Canada
- Province: Ontario
- City: Toronto

The Port Lands (also known as Portlands) of Toronto, Ontario, Canada are an industrial and recreational neighbourhood located about 5 kilometres south-east of downtown, located on the former Don River delta and most of Ashbridge's Bay.

Approximate geographical borders are the Gardiner Expressway/Don Valley Parkway ramps to the north and west, Lake Shore Boulevard to the north, Lake Ontario on the three remaining sides: the Inner Harbour to the west, Ashbridge's Bay to the east and the open waters of Lake Ontario to the south. Landmarks include the Portlands Energy Centre, Leslie Barns (streetcar facility), Ashbridges Bay Wastewater Treatment Plant, and the now out-of-service Hearn Generating Station. There is also parkland such as Cherry Beach, the Leslie Street Spit and Biidaasige Park.

== History ==
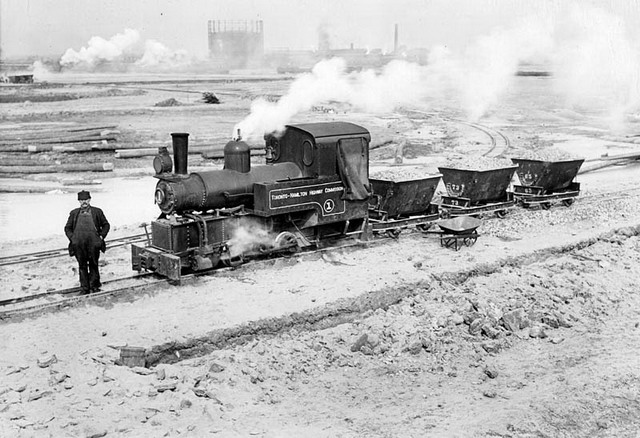
British Forgings H K Porter Narrow gauge locomotive (built for Toronto Hamilton Highway Commission) at Port Lands, 1917

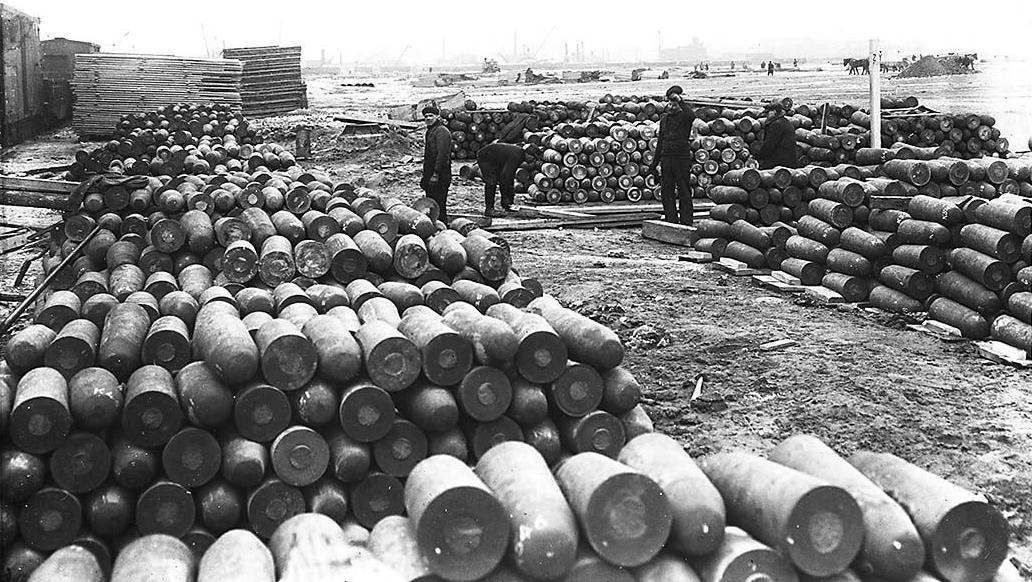
Munitions Dump at Ashbridge's Bay during the First World War. Development of the Port Lands began in the early 20th century.

Ashbridges Bay Marsh once existed at the delta of the Don River in Toronto. The marsh extended as far east as today's Leslie Street. Much of the Port Lands were initially part of Ashbridge's Bay, which consisted of a five-square-kilometre triangular area of marshes and ponds surrounded by sandbars. The water and reeds in the marsh provided habitat for birds and other animals. The area was connected to the Toronto Islands archipelago until a violent storm in 1858 created a natural channel break turning the archipelago into a series of islands to the west.

Pollution problems developed by the mid 19th century because of industrial development along the harbour and the lower Don River in addition to the use of the marsh for sewage disposal. By the 1880s, Gooderham and Worts was heavily using the marsh to dispose of waste from pigs and cattle, as well as wheat swill from their distilling operations. Up to 80,000 gallons (almost 364,000 L) per day of liquid manure drained into the marsh. The once natural area had now become an open sewage dump and a health hazard. A local newspaper described the situation as "a malarial swamp...teeming with pestilence and disease." By the 1890s, the potential threat of a cholera outbreak forced the city to act. In 1892, after the city threatened legal action, Gooderham and Worts installed a filtration system for waste.

In 1893, City engineer Edward Henry Keating (1844–1912) had the Keating Channel constructed to redirect the flow of the Don River west into Toronto Harbour. This improved the Don's flow but did not resolve the pollution problem. Also, the 90-degree curve of the river into the concrete-lined Keating Channel increased the risk of flooding in the Port Lands.

In 1912, the Toronto Harbour Commission started to develop the Ashbridge's Bay Reclamation Scheme. The plan was to drain and fill in the marsh in order to address health concerns, and to develop the area for industry and shipping. By 1922, 200 hectares of marsh were filled in, followed by another 200 hectares later in the 1920s. The marsh was eliminated between Cherry and Leslie Streets, and the Keating Channel became the sole outlet for the Don River.

In the 1950s, the Leslie Spit, the Hearn Generating Station, the Commissioners Incinerator and the Gardiner Expressway were built, the latter over the mouth of the Don River. There was a hope that the opening of the Saint Lawrence Seaway would make the Port Lands a major industrial and shipping hub; however, this hope was not fulfilled.

By the 1970s, most industries had left the area, and much of the land was polluted from former heavy manufacturing and oil refinery operations. By the 1980s, the Port Lands were used primarily for light industry, as well as for municipal facilities such as salt storage. In the early 2000s, several film production studios were built in the area.

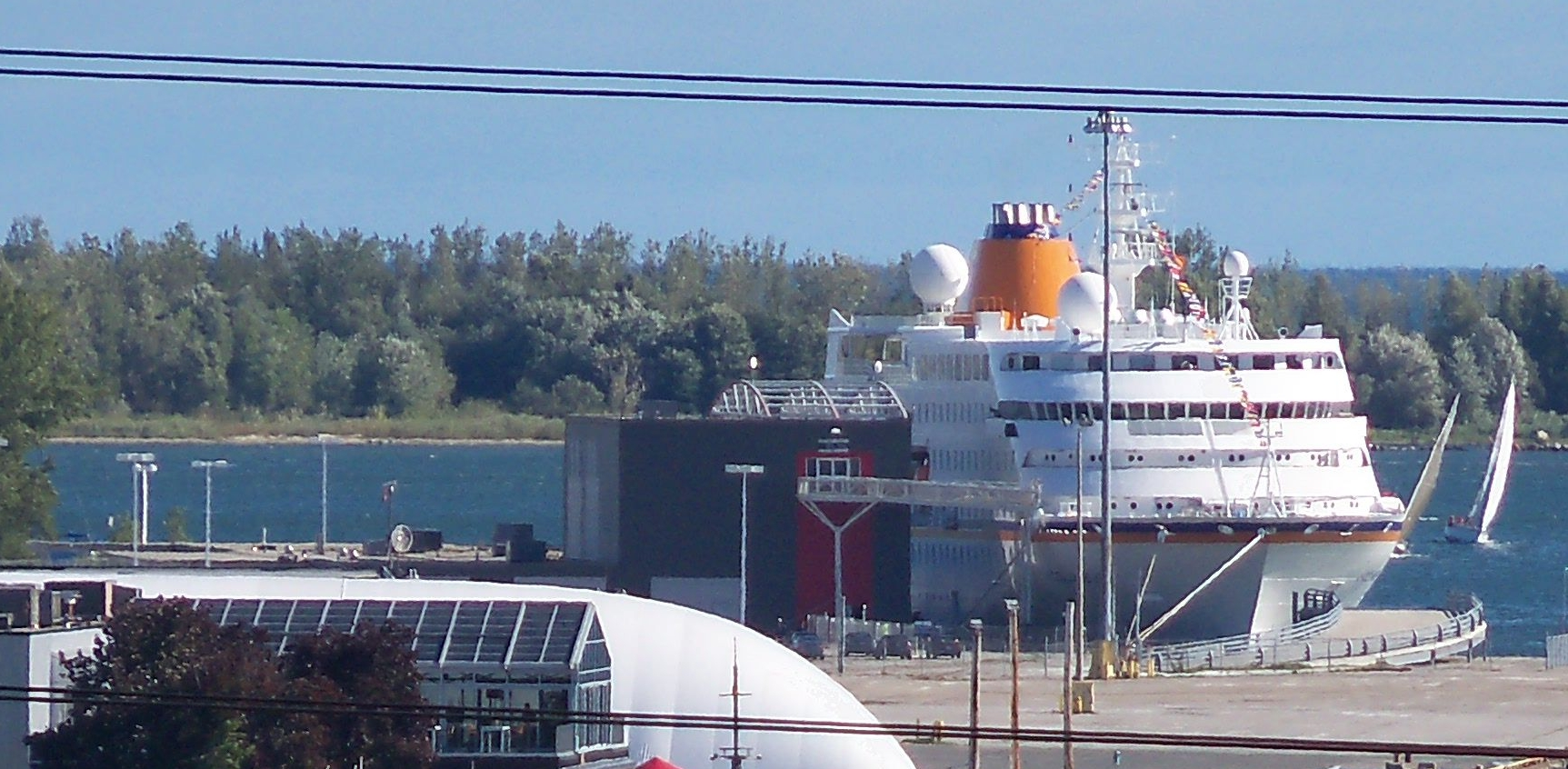
The International Marine Passenger Terminal is a cruise ship terminal built in 2005, and is managed by PortsToronto.

In 2001, the City of Toronto, the Province of Ontario and the federal government jointly created the Toronto Waterfront Revitalization Corporation, today known as Waterfront Toronto, to plan for the renewal and redevelopment of the Port Lands. By this time the Port Lands were considered to be the largest under-developed and under-used urban space in North America.

In 2017, Waterfront Toronto received $1.25 billion from municipal, provincial and federal levels of government to clean up the Port Lands and protect the area from flooding by naturalizing the mouth of the Don River. There was also the goal to prepare for residential development and create more parks within the Port Lands. In 2025, the municipal, provincial, and federal governments provided $325 million each for housing on Ookwemin Minising as well as Quayside.

=== Ashbridge streetcar line ===
The Ashbridge streetcar line was an early public transit service in the Port Lands. It opened on November 5, 1917 to serve workers employed at munitions factories in the Port Lands during World War I. The City of Toronto constructed and owned the line but had the Toronto Railway Company (TRC) operate it.

The double-track line ran south from Queen Street, crossed over the Grand Trunk Railway tracks and the Keating Channel on a trestle, following the Don Roadway and turned west on Commissioners Street running in a reserved right-of-way that terminated at Cherry Street. At each end, the line had a single track terminus without a turning loop or wye; the line used bidirectional streetcars supplied by the TRC.

The Toronto Transportation Commission took over the TRC and the Ashbridge line on September 1, 1921. On September 19, 1924, the line was replaced by buses after the streetcar trestle over the Keating Channel was deemed to be unsafe for further use.

=== Railway line ===
The Toronto Port Lands Company owned the last remaining railway line in the Port Lands, which made a U-shape loop around the area. The line branched from the Union Station Rail Corridor just west of the Don River, passed through the Keating Yard just east of the Don Roadway, crossed to the south side of Lake Shore Boulevard, turned south on the west side of Leslie Street, then ran west roughly parallel to Unwin Avenue to terminate at the Port of Toronto facility west of Cherry Street. The right-of-way was 9 metres (30 ft) wide and trains on the line travelled at slow speed.

By 2017, the Keating Yard had been reduced to a passing loop used to run the locomotive around its train. A train would operate every one to three weeks to bring five or six carloads of chemicals to the Ashbridges Bay Wastewater Treatment Plant on the east side of Leslie Street. The Port of Toronto facility was not using the rail service at the time, but according to a 2017 City of Toronto port, TPLC had the responsibility to keep the line open in case some future development in the area needs it. As of 2019, Google Maps showed that the line was severed at Commissioners Street to accommodate the construction of a building on the former right-of-way.

== Toronto Port Lands Company ==
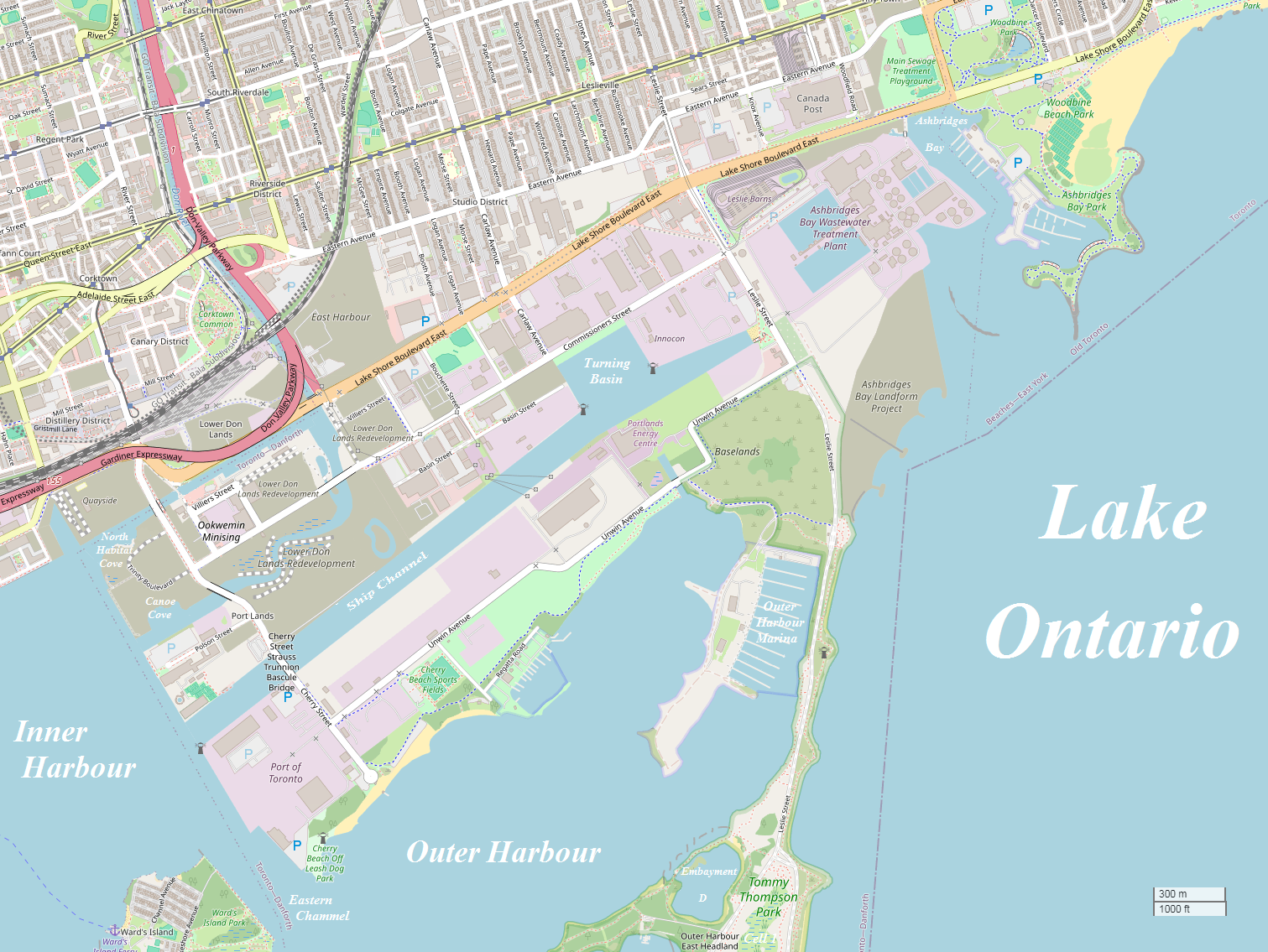
Detailed map of Toronto's Port Lands

In 1986, the City of Toronto created the Toronto Economic Development Corporation which since 2009 has operated under the name Toronto Port Lands Company. TPLC is a City corporation that manages real estate assets and promotes development in the Port Lands. With respect to development, it works closely with Waterfront Toronto. TPLC is the largest landowner in the Port Lands with 160 hectares (400 acres) in its portfolio, and acts as landlord with over 80 tenants as of 2015.

== Ookwemin Minising ==
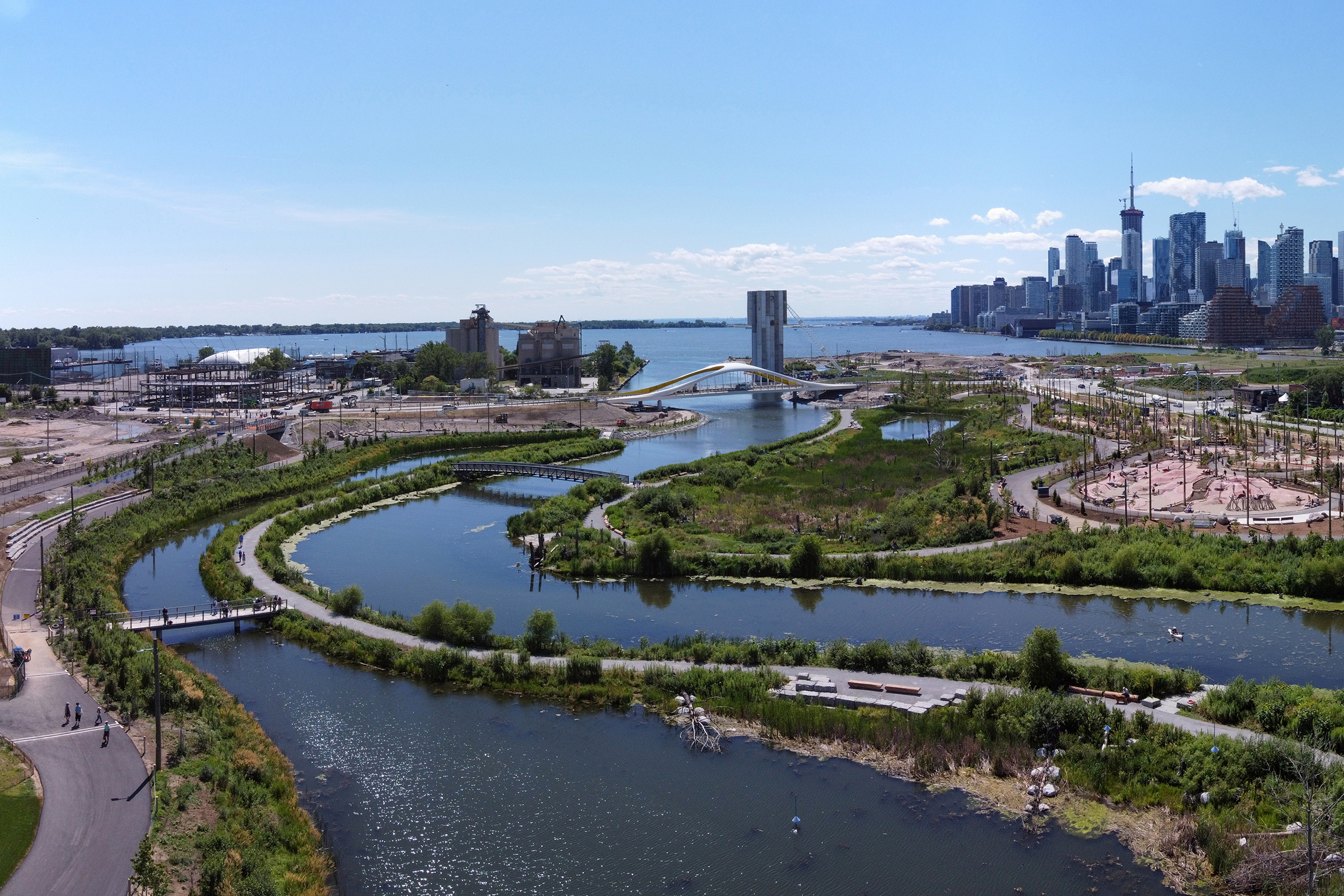
Ookwemin Minising

Ookwemin Minising is a 22-hectare (54-acre) island in the Port Lands created as part of Waterfront Toronto's Port Lands Flood Protection Project. The waters of the Don River made a 90-degree turn into the Keating Channel, creating a bottleneck that often leads to flooding. In 2024, Waterfront Toronto completed a channel running south from the Don River, and then west between Commissioners Street and the Shipping Channel to provide a second outlet for the river. Parks and wetlands was completed in 2025 along this new water course, which will form the east and south side of the new island. The Keating Channel and Toronto Harbour are on the north and west side of the new island respectively. Mixed-use residential development is planned for Ookwemin Minising.

== Streets ==
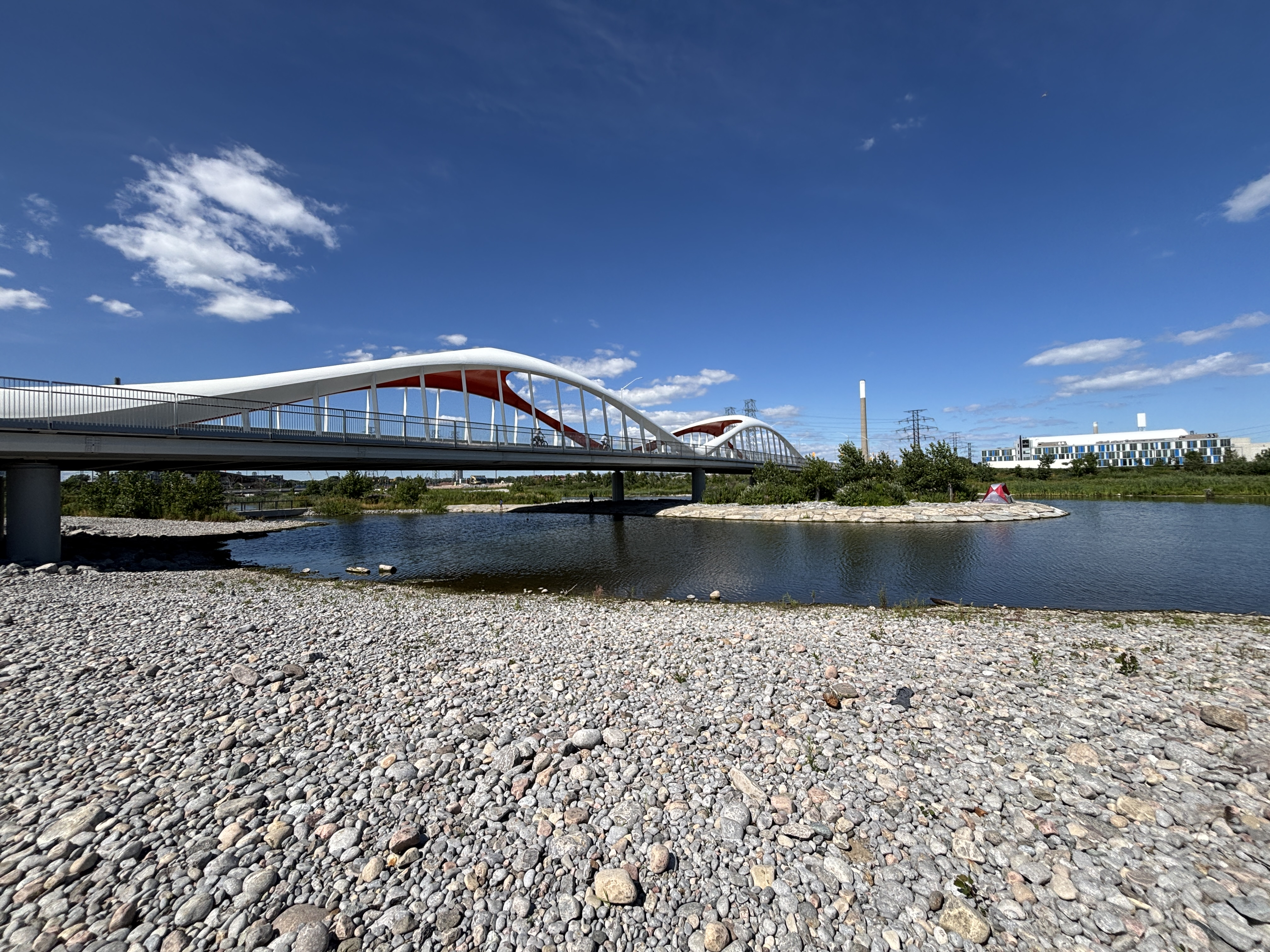
Commissioner Street Bridge

The district is bounded on the north by Lake Shore Boulevard and on the east by Leslie Street. Cherry Street anchors the west side, providing access south from Lake Shore Boulevard to Cherry Beach.

Commissioners Street and Unwin Avenue are two streets that span east–west between Cherry and Leslie Streets. Named after the members of the Toronto Harbour Commission, Commissioners Street is the spine across the area north of the ship channel. East of Leslie Street the road becomes North Service Road. Unwin Avenue (named for Charles Unwin, provincial and Toronto city surveyor, who surveyed Toronto Islands after 1858) is to the south between the ship channel and the lake. It serves the Outer Harbour Marina.

The Don Roadway makes a connection with the south end of the Don Valley Parkway. Carlaw Avenue and Logan Avenue cross from the north side of Lake Shore Boulevard to Commissioners Street. Other minor streets entirely within the northerly area are Bouchette Street (named for Joseph Bouchette surveyor of Upper Canada in 1793), Saulter Street South, Basin Street, Villiers Street, Munition Street and Polson Street. In the south, Regatta Road leads from Unwin Avenue to the sailing clubs on the outer harbour.

== Industry and transportation ==
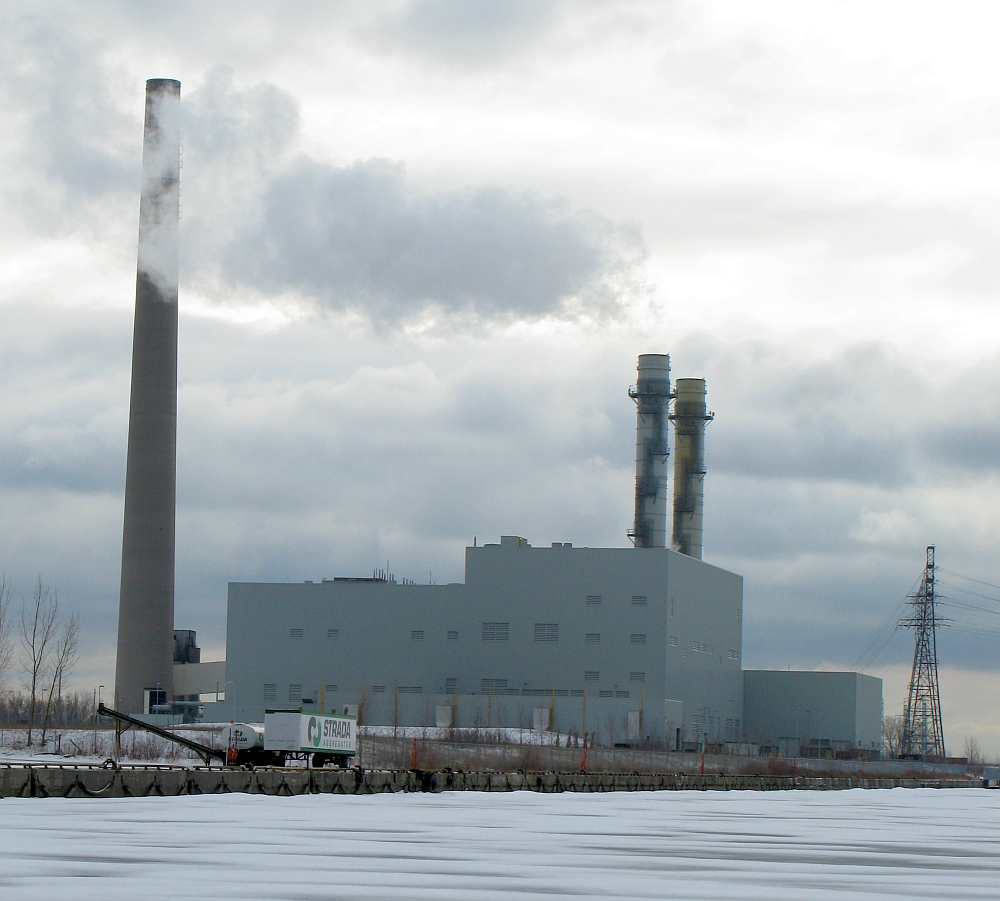
Portlands Energy Centre is a natural gas power station in the Port Lands.

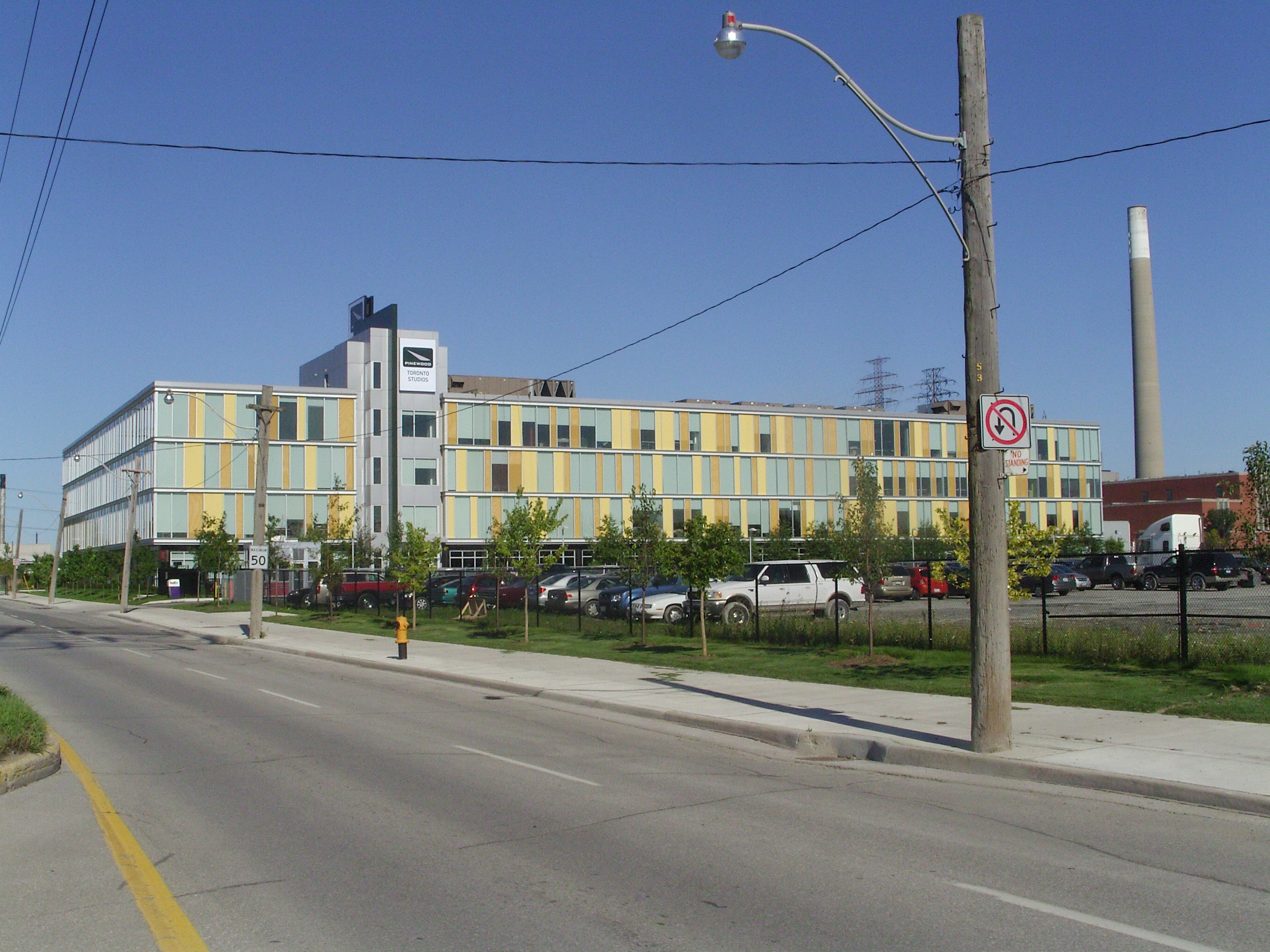
Pinewood Toronto Studios was built in 2008 on a former Esso oil tank farm in the Port Lands.

The Port of Toronto is a 21-hectare (52-acre) container shipping facility and a cruise ship terminal along the eastern shore of the inner harbour operated by PortsToronto. PortsToronto also operates the large Outer Harbour Marina in between Cherry and Leslie Streets. The Portlands Energy Centre, a cogeneration power plant, is situated beside the now defunct Richard L. Hearn Generating Station.

The Toronto Transit Commission has two facilities in the Port Lands. Its Lakeshore garage on Commissioners Street services Wheel-Trans minibuses. The TTC's Leslie Barns on Leslie Street is a maintenance and storage facility for streetcars.

Toronto Hydro has a 49,000-square-metre (12-acre) facility at 500 Commissioners Street. In 2009, the facility had 189 solar panels to generate 36 kilowatts (kW) of electricity for internal use.

Starting in 2013, the Toronto Port Lands Company created a "concrete campus" at 575 Commissioners Street near Leslie Street. This consolidated the operations of several concrete companies including Essroc, Lafarge, Metrix, and St. Mary's into one location. The campus freed up the companies' former spaces at other port locations for cleanup and redevelopment.

Other industrial include road salt storage, a roof shingle manufacturing and a waste transfer station on the site of a deactivated incinerator. The Hearn Generating Station smokestack (215 metres (705 ft) in height), together with the Ashbridges Bay sewage sludge incinerator stack and the Commissioners Street waste incinerator stack stand as towering landmarks of a bygone industrial era. All three facilities are no longer in operation.

The Pinewood Toronto Studios (formerly FilmPort) was built on the 11 acres (4.5 ha) site of a former Esso oil tank farm. The first phase opened in 2008.

== Parks and recreation ==
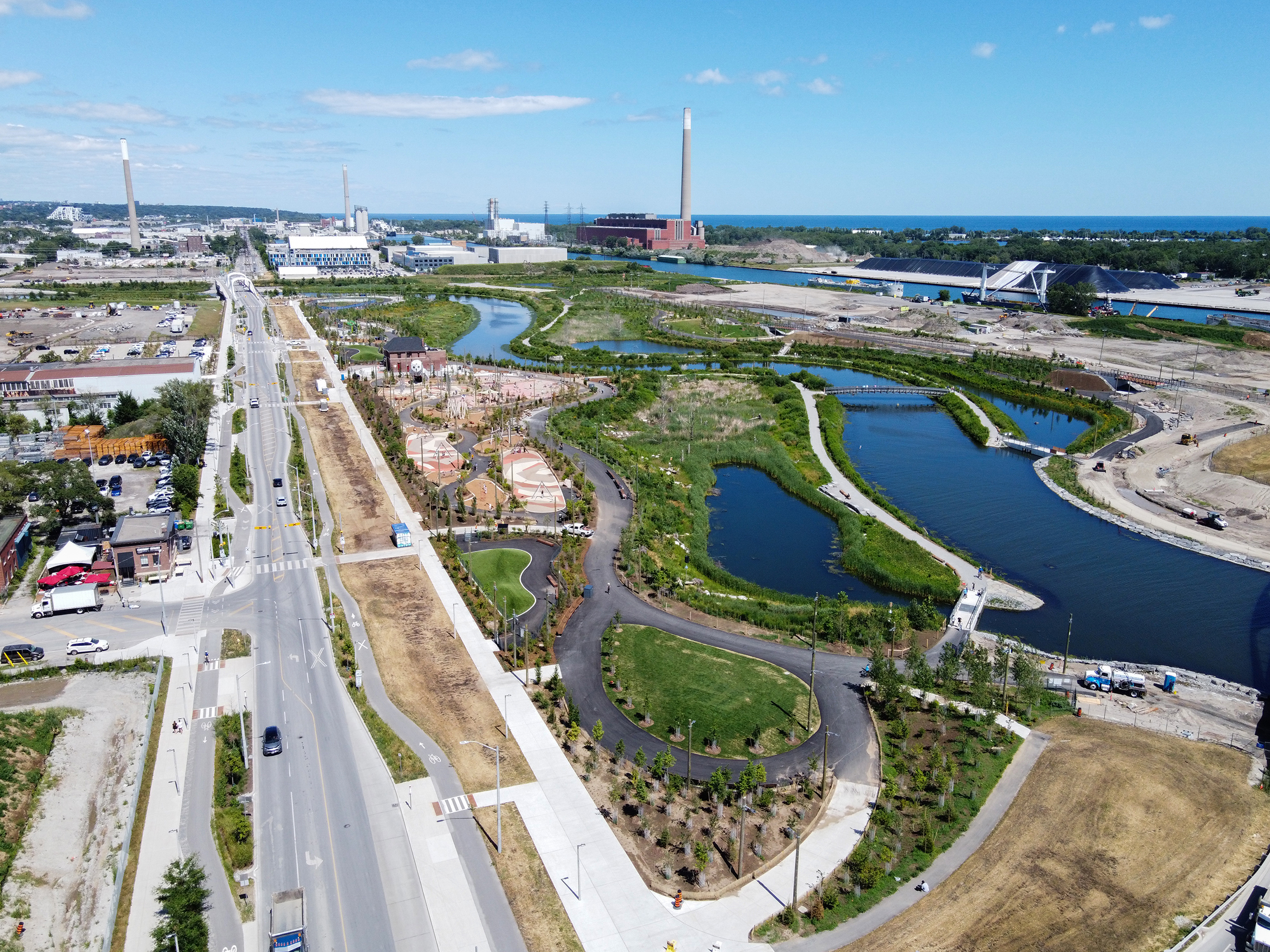
Biidaasige Park opened in July 2025

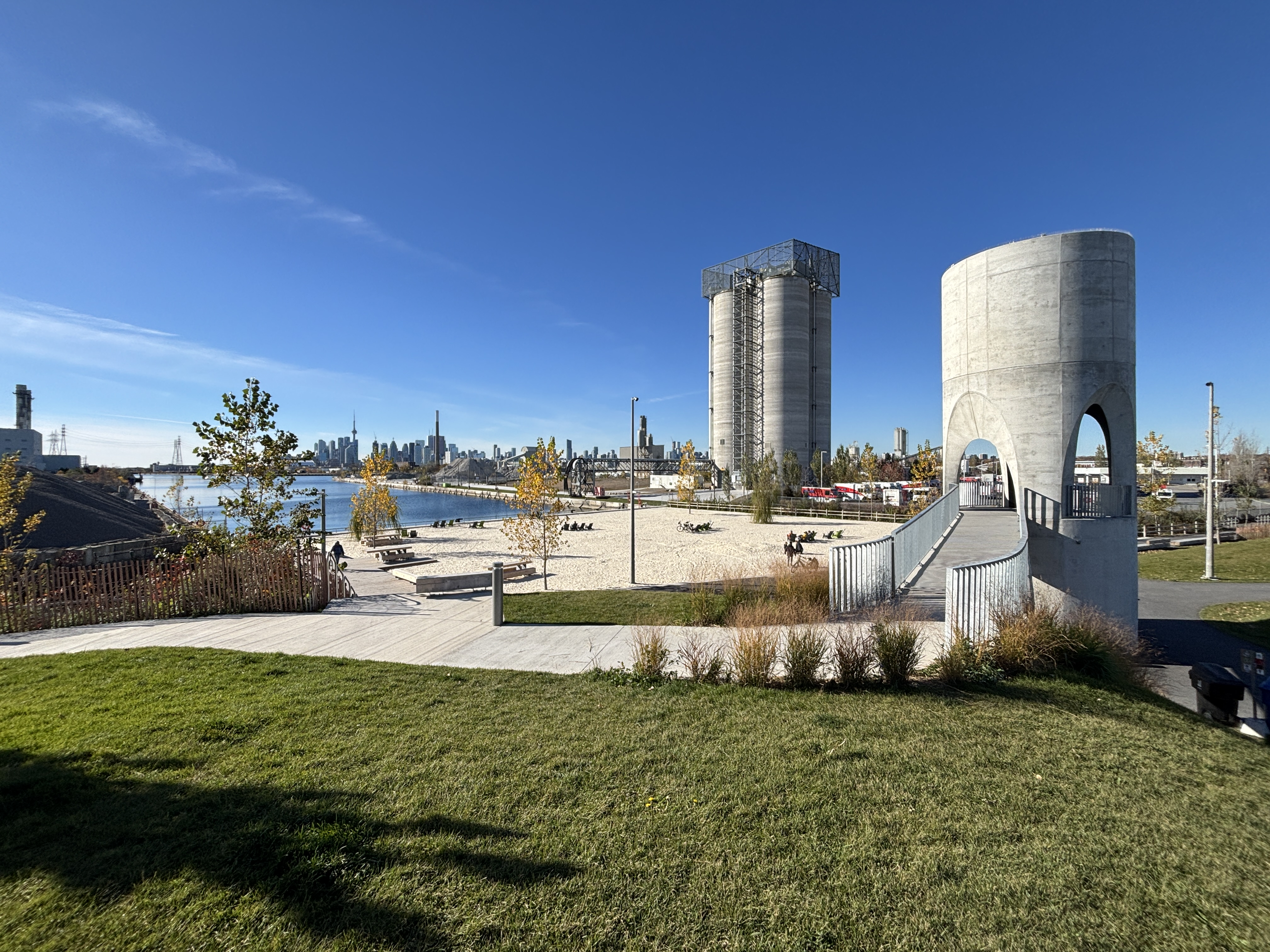
Leslie Lookout Park

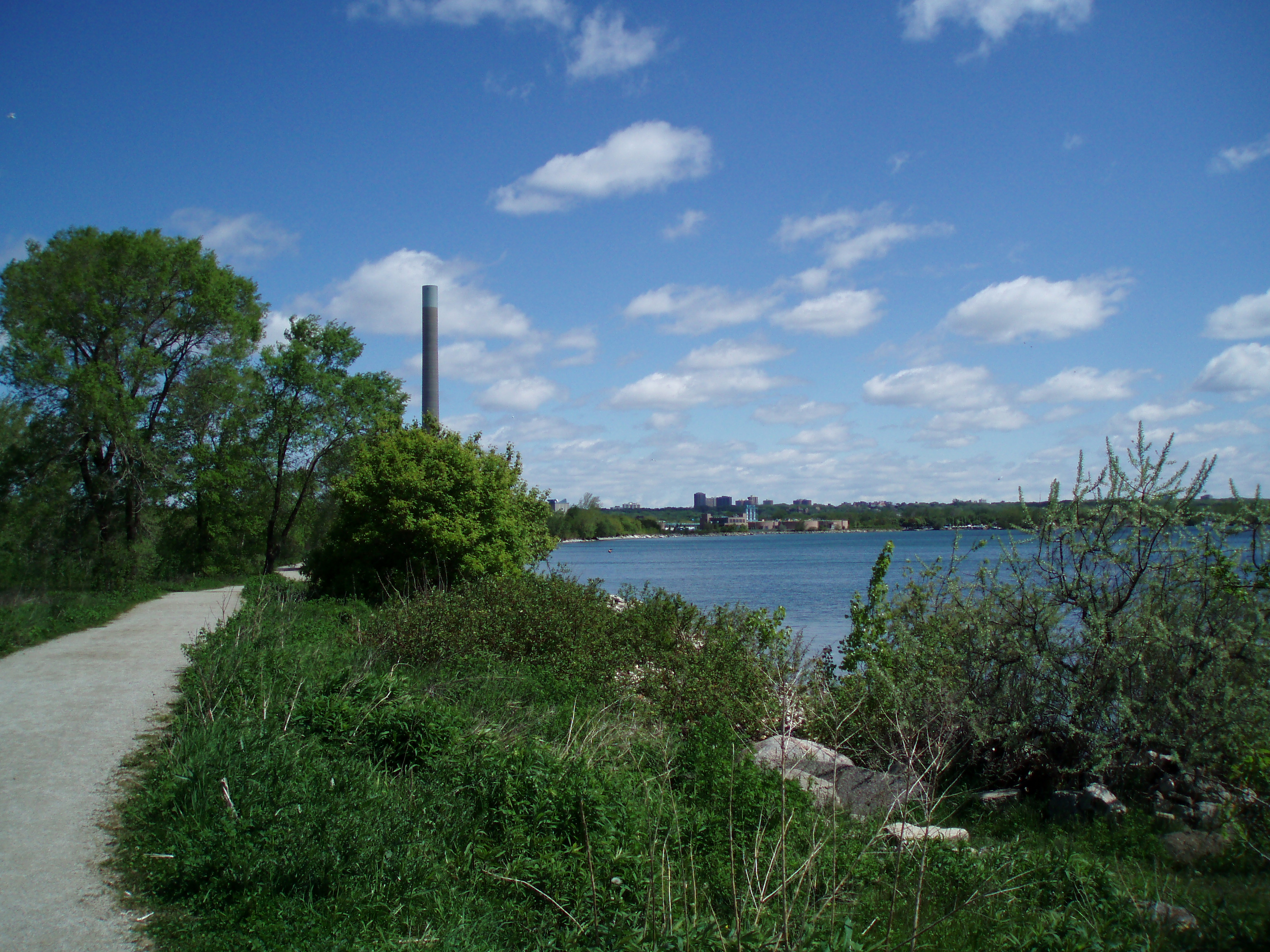
Leslie Street Spit is a man-made headland that extends south, forming Toronto's Outer Harbour.

The area along the south shore of the Port Lands has become mostly recreational. The Leslie Street Spit extends south from the Port lands and forms an outer harbour, sheltering a bird sanctuary and two boating marinas in the outer harbour.

The south-western corner of the Port Lands is home to Cherry Beach and the north-western part of the island is home to Biidaasige Park that opened on July 18, 2025, and people can expect to move into new housing on the island by 2031 as part of a first development phase.

Regatta Road is a short street that runs south of Unwin Avenue just east of Cherry Street along the Martin Goodman Trail. It is home to a number of rowing and sailing clubs:

- Hanlan Boat Club
- Mooredale Sailing Club
- St. James Town Sailing Club
- West Wood Sailing Club
- Sailing Fanatics
- Toronto Multihull Sailing Club

== Arts and entertainment ==
Other commercial uses also exist on the land. The vacated factory spaces have become home to a small cultural contingent, consisting mostly of musician jam spaces and recording studios. The old box factory on Polson Pier houses the studio of artist Max Dean, as well as the gallery and warehouse of the artist collective VSVSVS. The Rebel nightclub is located on Polson Street.

Cirque du Soleil presented a touring version of several shows under the Grand Chapiteau on vacant lands of the area between 2007 and 2017. A tent holding up to 2,500 people was pitched on vacant land at the south-east corner of Cherry and Commissioners Streets.

== See also ==
- Waterfront East LRT, a proposal for streetcar service along Queens Quay East into the Port Lands
- Martin Goodman Trail
- West Don Lands
- Leslieville
- The Beaches
