= Port of Toronto =

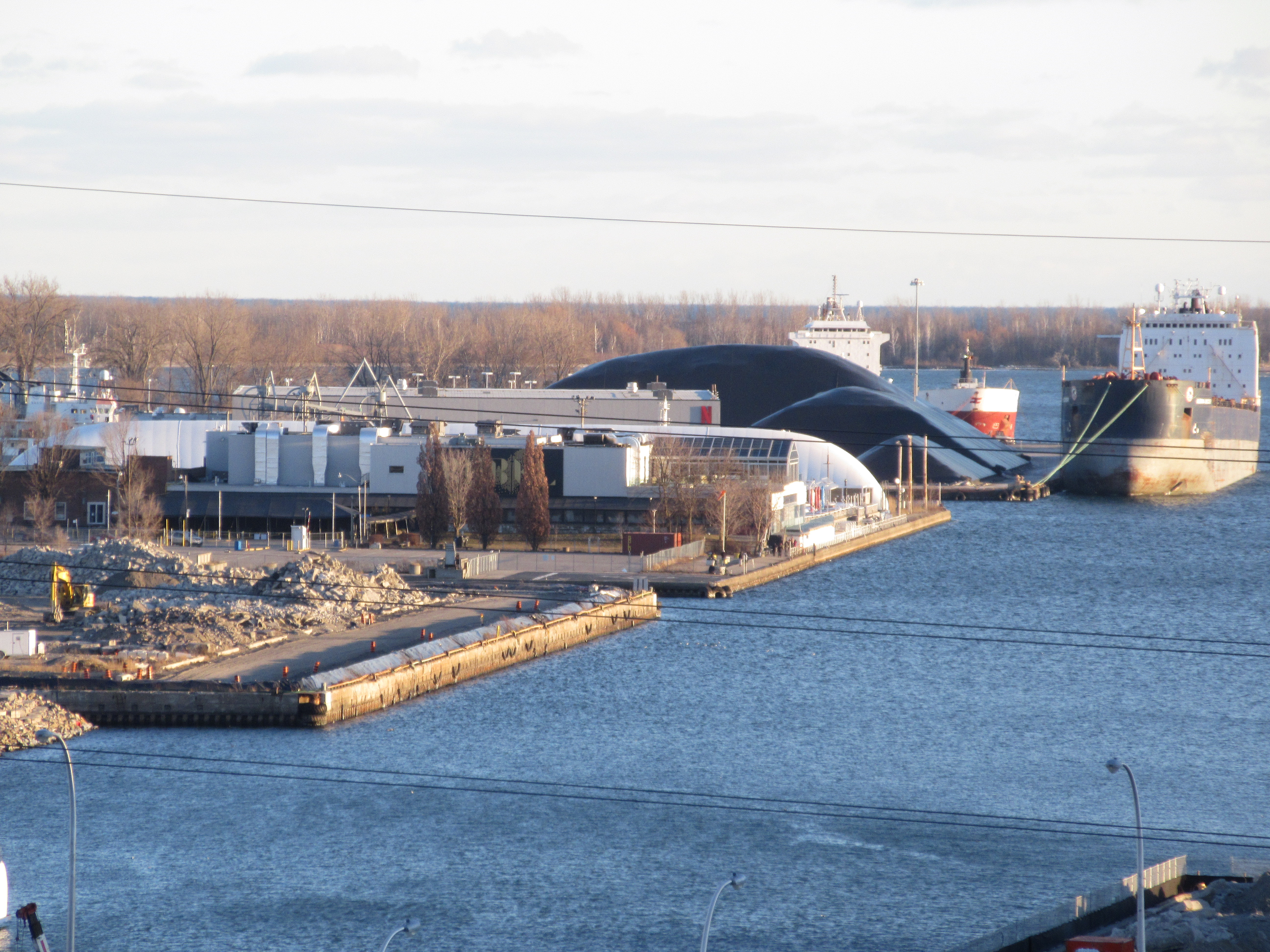
- View of the Port of Toronto from the north, 2021

Location
- Country: Canada
- Location: Port Lands, Toronto, Ontario
- Coordinates: 43.637°N 79.349°W

Details
- Opened: 1793 (Note: The first cargo ships to use Toronto as a port was in 1751, although governance of port operations in Toronto was only assumed by the Province of Upper Canada in 1793.)
- Operated by: PortsToronto
- Size: 21 ha (52 acres) (Note: The following figure includes only the areas in the Port Lands.)
- No. of berths: 7 (Note: Does not include other Toronto Harbour berths situated outside the Port of Toronto.)
- Draft depth: 8.2 metres (27 ft)
- Chairman: Robert D. Poirier
- Warehouse space: 23,200 square metres (250,000 sq ft)

Statistics
- Vessel arrivals: 178 (2018)
- Annual cargo tonnage: 2,179,795 metric tonnes (2018)
- Annual revenue: C$9.109 million (2018)
- Net income: C$3.645 million (2018)
- Main imports: Aggregate/stone, cement, salt, sugar
- Website www.portstoronto.com/port-of-toronto.aspx

The Port of Toronto is an inland port on the northwest shoreline of Lake Ontario in Toronto, Ontario, Canada. The port covers over 21 hectares (52 acres) of land on the eastern shore of the Toronto Harbour, in an area known as the Port Lands. The port includes several facilities, including Marine Terminal 51, Warehouse 52, and the International Marine Passenger Terminal. The Port of Toronto is operated by PortsToronto.

The first commercial ship to use Toronto as a port was in 1751. In 1793, governance of the port was assumed by the Province of Upper Canada. In 1911, the federal government of Canada formed the Toronto Harbour Commission to operate the Port of Toronto. The Port of Toronto was expanded in the first half of the 20th century, with the expansion of the Port Lands, and the creation of new wharfs in present-day East Bayfront and other areas on the Toronto waterfront. Port activity increased in the mid-20th century with the opening of the Fourth Welland Canal in 1932, and the St. Lawrence Seaway in 1959. In 1999, port operations were transferred from the Toronto Harbour Commission to the Toronto Port Authority (later renamed PortsToronto). In 2005, the International Marine Passenger Terminal was opened.

== History ==
The first commercial shipments to arrive in the Toronto shipment arrived at Fort Rouillé in 1751. It took until 1793, when Toronto was founded, for a shipping port to be established. In the early 1800s, the rise of steam-powered vessels and the opening of the Beauharnois Canal in 1985 and Williamsburg canal in 1849, made through travel by ship from the Atlantic Ocean to Toronto possible, greatly increasing the usage of the port. In the 1850s, the Ontario, Simcoe and Huron Railway, the Grand Trunk Railway, and the Great Western Railway commenced operations to the port along the Toronto waterfront, transforming the port into a intermodal cargo hub. In 1858, the Eastern Gap was dug out, making it easier to access the port from the east side of Lake Ontario.

In 1911, the Toronto Harbour Commission was founded and from 1912 to 1925, the Toronto Harbour Commission, now PortsToronto, revealed a large overall plan for the Toronto waterfront. The plan saw the clearing of old piers, the filling of waterlots and the Port Lands area, where the current Port of Toronto of is located. In 1955, Marine Terminal 11 opened, it was the first of three 100,000-square-foot warehouses to be constructed. In 1959, the St. Lawrence Seaway was opened, making the port accessible to ocean freighters with a 27-foot draft. In 1962, the Toronto Harbour Commission took over operation of the marine terminals on the harbour. In 1966, Marine Terminal 51 opened at the entrance of the Shop Channel in the Port Lands. In 1969, Marine Terminal 35 became the busiest terminal in the harbour. and in 1985 intermodal operation commenced at the terminal.

Through the 1990s, traffic to the port decreased and more and more cargo was being transported over rail and roads. The current operator of the port, PortsToronto, was established in 1998 through the Canada Marine Act to help modernize and consolidate the declining operations at the port. Before this, the Port of Toronto had been governed by the Upper Canada, the Toronto Harbour Trust, and then the Toronto Harbour Commission.

In 2005, the International Marine Passenger Terminal was opened. It was originally meant to be used by a ferry service to Rochester, but the service ran only between June and September, 2004 and again between June and December 2005, using a catamaran then known as the Spirit of Ontario (now known as [HSC Virgen de Coromoto]) before the company running the service failed in 2006. The Passenger Terminal then served as a set for movie and TV productions. In 2012, the terminal started to be used as a port of call for Great Lakes cruises.

== Facilities ==
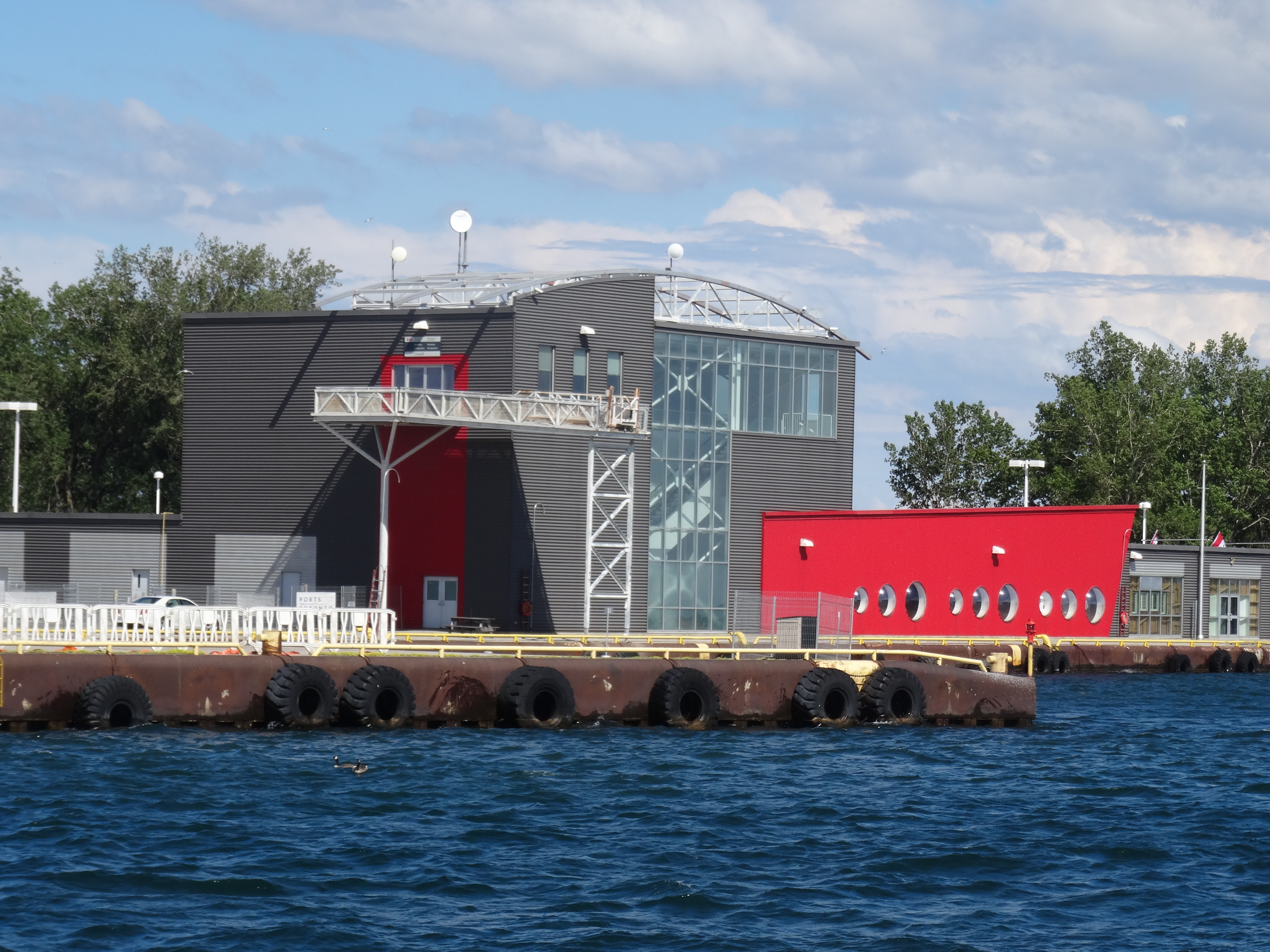
The International Marine Passenger Terminal at the Port of Toronto.

The port is made up of several port facilities, including Marine Terminal 51, Warehouse 52, and the International Marine Passenger Terminal.

There are 3 miles (4.8 km) of deep-water wharfage for the loading and unloading of bulk products. Marine terminals include inside and outside storage, and some 6,000 square feet (560 m^{2}) of berthing space for ships carrying general cargo.

== Services ==
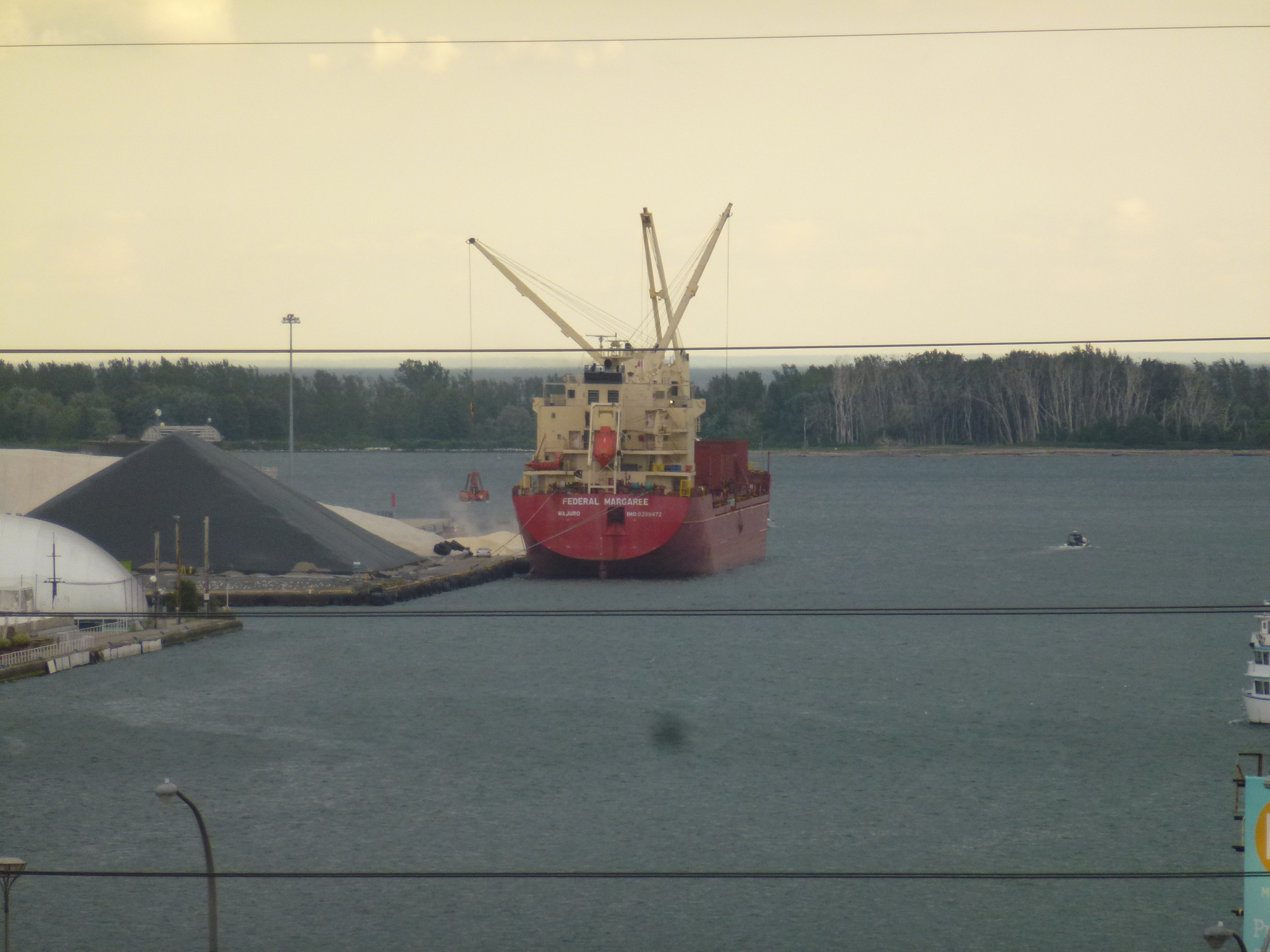
A bulk carrier using its crane to unload its cargo at the Port of Toronto.

=== Cargo ===
The tonnage of cargo passing through the port is made up mostly of sugar to the Redpath refinery and aggregate materials such as sand, gravel and salt. In 2015, the port received 1.7 million tonnes of cargo, 36th-largest in Canada. By comparison, Colborne, Ontario, shipped 1.671 million tonnes while Hamilton handled 13.66 million tonnes. Total tonnage handled in Canadian ports was 466.148 billion tonnes.

=== Passenger ===
Passenger traffic is handled by the International Marine Passenger Terminal. The terminal was originally built as a passenger terminal for a ferry to Rochester, New York, but the service was discontinued after less than one year. Since then, the terminal has seen growth as a port for Great Lakes cruises.
