= Pink House =

Pink House or The Pink House may refer to:

== Buildings ==
- Casa Rosada or Casa de Gobierno (Government House), the official seat of the executive branch of government for Argentina
- Pink House (Melbourne Beach, Florida)
- Pink House (Newbury, Massachusetts)
- Pink House (Kansas City, Missouri)
- Pink House (Charleston, South Carolina)
- The Pink House, a building on the campus of Princeton University, part of Forbes College
- Louis Heaton Pink Houses, a Brooklyn, New York public housing project
- Pink House (Montreal), an art project in Montreal
- The Olde Pink House in Savannah, Georgia, US

== Other ==
- The Pink House (film), 2017 Peruvian thriller drama film directed by Palito Ortega Matute
- "Pink Houses", a song by John Cougar Mellencamp
- Little Pink House, a 2017 biographical film
- "Winter, Montreal (The Pink House)", a painting by James Wilson Morrice

== See also ==
- Big Pink, a pink house in West Saugerties, New York, a writing and recording location for Bob Dylan and the Band
- Pink House
- The Pink House
