= Canada Malting Silos, Montreal =

Abandoned malting facility in Canada

Coordinates: 45.4686°N 73.58839°W

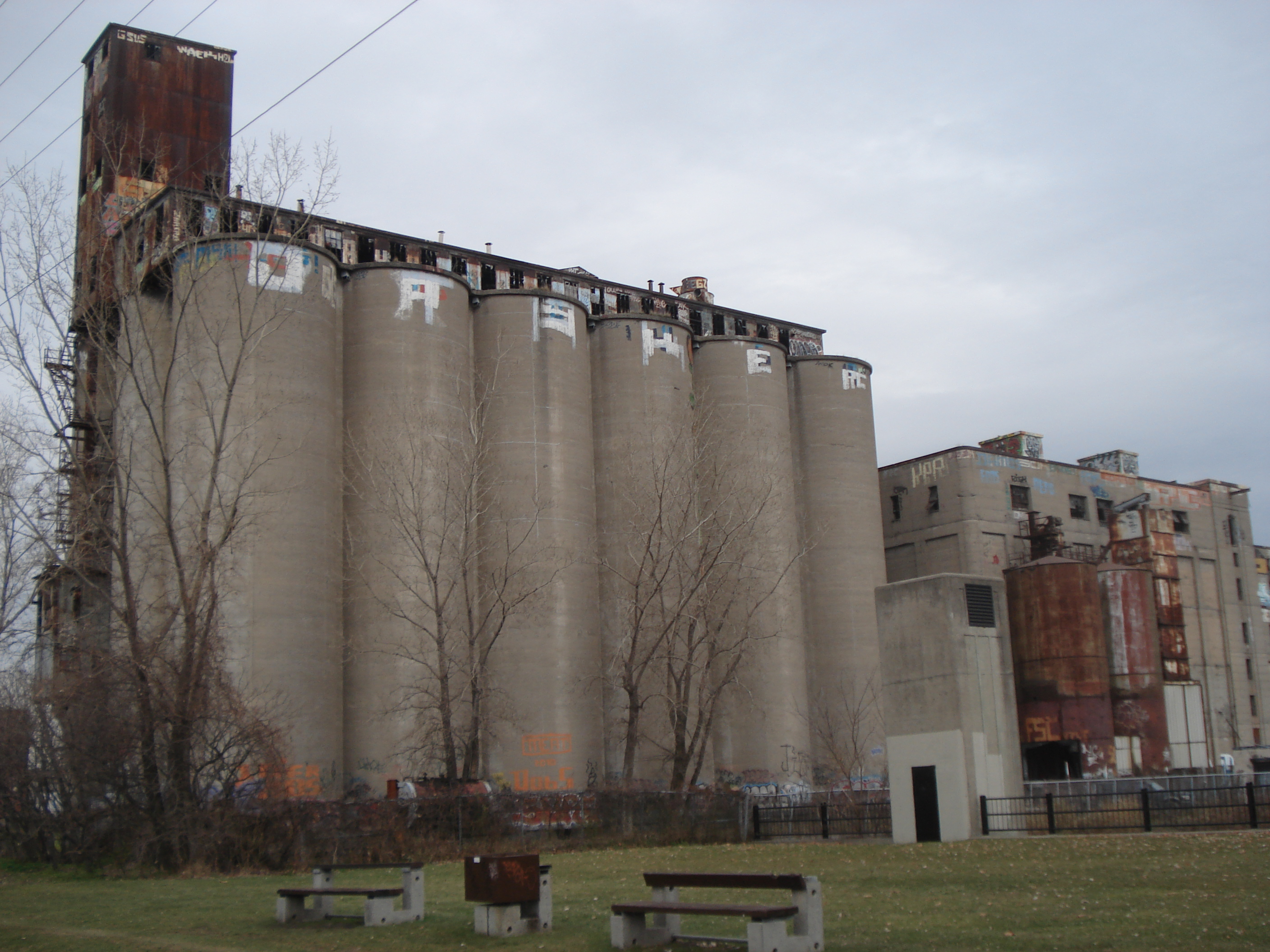
Eastern face of Canada Malting building

Canada Malting silos in Saint-Henri, Montreal, October 2026

Canadian Malting Silos is an abandoned malting factory located in the Saint-Henri neighbourhood of Montreal, Canada.

== Description ==
The Canada Malting complex was designed by David Jerome Spence, and was built in 1904. On the west side of the complex there are nine violet coloured silos. They are covered in treated clay tiles that were manufactured by the Barnett and Record Co. of Minneapolis. These silos are rare examples of using this technique to cover and insulate silos. The cement silos on the other side were added in the 1940s, and were used to store the barley used to produce the malt. The barley was germinated and dried in the buildings that lined Saint-Ambroise Street. The factory had an output of 250,000 pounds (110,000 kg) of malt per year, and distributed it to distilleries and breweries. The closing of the Lachine Canal in 1970 forced the company to transport its malt by train only, and around 1980, the building was actually too small and the transportation costs too high, so the company abandoned the site and moved into a new malting complex located at 205 Riverside and Mill Street, Montreal. The building was then sold for $500,000 and became a soya and corn storage facility for Quonta Holding Ltd, before it was abandoned in 1989 when Canadian National ceased its rail line service to factories in this area of the canal. The ancient clay silos are now protected as part of the Lachine Canal National Historic Site. They have been so battered from both the elements and vandalism, that it is no longer possible to restore them. Since being abandoned in 1989, the factory has been covered in graffiti on the outside as well as the inside of the building. Several videos posted to YouTube have captured footage of the inside and rooftops of the building. An article written by Bernard Lamarche in Le Devoir in May, 2005, described the interior of the building as being in a state of deep disrepair. Lamarche described the building having a pungent smell, with empty cans of spray paint and broken glass littering the floors. In October 2026, CBC News reported that a Montreal engineering firm had assessed the building as being in imminent danger of collapse, and had recommended its immediate controlled demolition to protect the surrounding neighbourhood from falling wreckage. La Presse emphasized that the engineering firm had been hired by the building's owner, who had sought to redevelop the site; Veronique Fournier, mayor of the Sud-Ouest borough, stated that the borough would be seeking a second opinion.

Partial demolition of the Canada Malting silos, Montreal, October 2026

== Canada Malting Building-inspired projects and events ==
In May, 2005, as part of the Obsolescences event, and to celebrate the one-hundredth anniversary of the edifice's founding, lighting artist Axel Mongenthaler created a light show by mounting several lights on the rooftop of the building. As part of a press event organized by the Quartier Éphémère, journalists were invited to put on hard-hats and carry flashlights for a guided tour of the building. The installation itself consisted of several strobe-lights and green and red lights affixed on the North and South towers, to reflect the buildings connection with the Lachine waterway. A video clip posted by Morgenthaler can be viewed here: In 2011, Quebec artist Ian Langohr created a mask inspired by the factory. Langohr created the mask from bits of plastic, rubber and metal found on the streets or in the dark corners of Saint-Henri hardware stores, using techniques he picked up working in a mascot production company. In an article published on spacing.ca, Langohr described his inspiration for the work, "I have been fascinated by the old maltage plant since moving to St. Henri in 2009. I find it surrealistic in itself, as it sort of resembles a bizarre collage of industrial buildings. The holes, rust, graffiti and general decaying nature just add to the charm." As of 2019, the factory is the site of the Little Pink House.

== See also ==
- Canada Malting Silos, Toronto
- Victory Soya Mills Silos, Toronto
- Maple Leaf Mills Silos, Toronto (demolished 1983)
- Saint-Henri, Montreal
- Lachine Canal
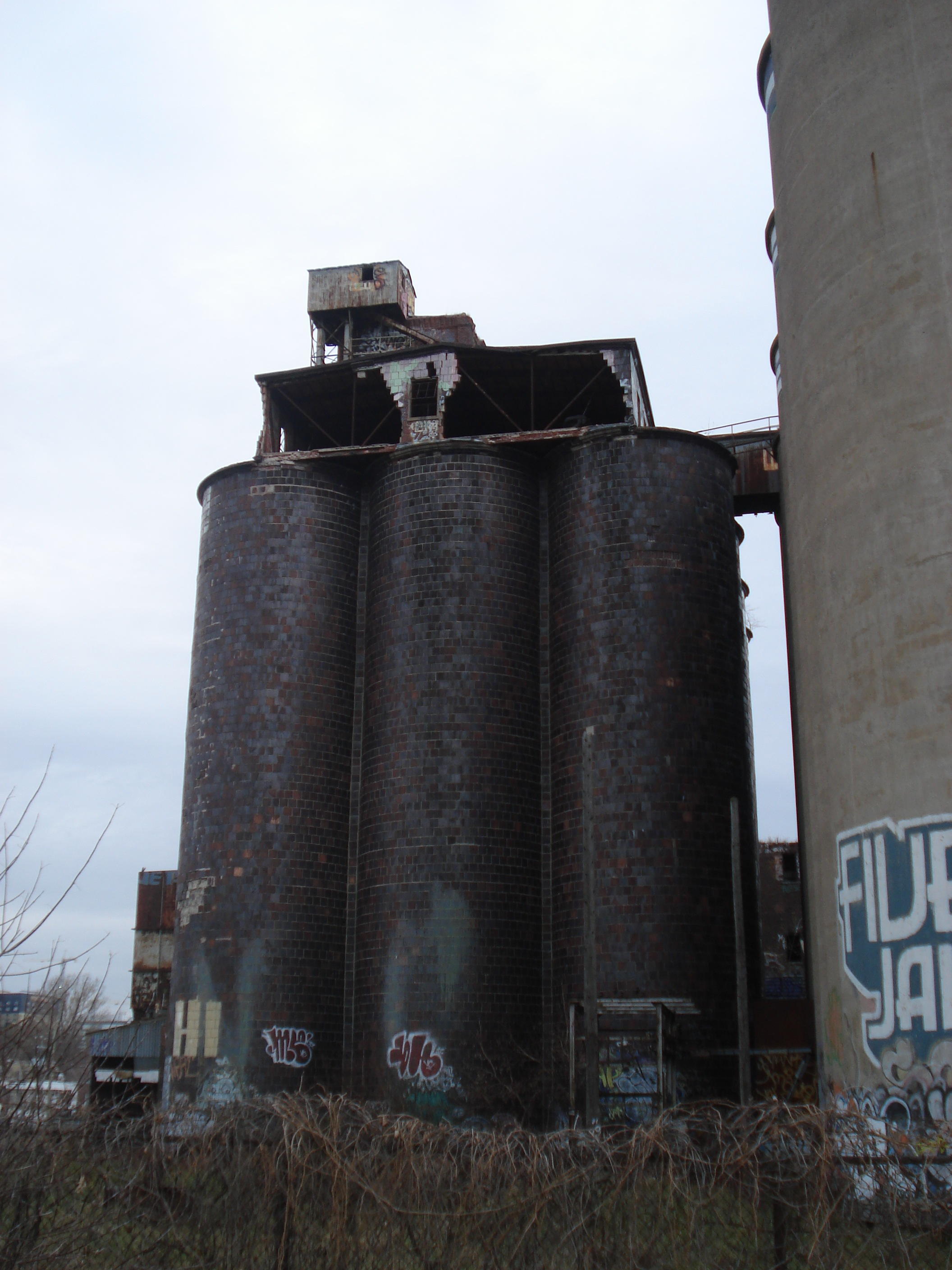
Clay tiled silos on South side of Canada Malting building.

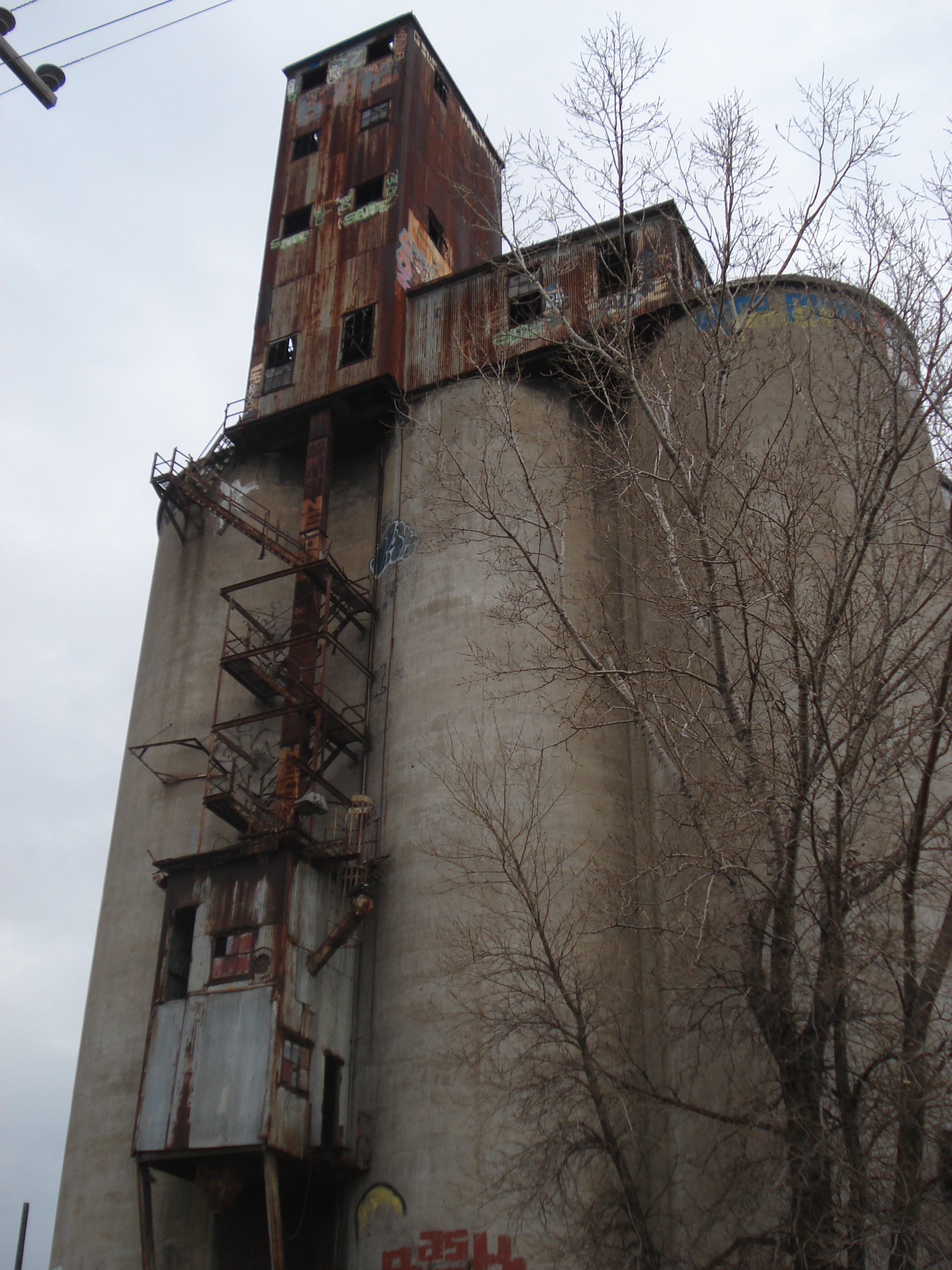
South side of Canada Malting building.

Canada Malting silos in Saint-Henri, Montreal, October 2026

Partial demolition of the Canada Malting silos, Montreal, October 2026
