= Unicorn planning =

Idealistic approach to urban planning

Unicorn planning is a term coined by Hannah Rebentisch, Caroline Thompson, Laurence Côté-Roy, and Dr. Sarah Moser at McGill's New Cities Lab in 2020 that describes an idealistic approach to urban planning. Specifically, the term describes a high-risk high-reward techno-utopian mega-development built from scratch with an expectation of instant success borrowing from the idea of a unicorn start-up which, in finance, is a start-up company valued over $1 billion.

Unicorn planning approaches city design with technology as the solution to the urban problems of the old cities. The creation of brand new ‘smart’ developments built from scratch has proven particularly seductive in emerging economies, where they are perceived as an opportunity to address urgent urban challenges, showcase technological prowess, and gain visibility on the global stage. Moreover, unicorn planning leverages the appealing nature of technology to gain capital for new city projects. The idea of applying technological advancements to urban development is appealing to many governments where the new city projects are planned since it outsources much of the development, and their associated costs to venture investors, relying on the private sector to deliver successful new city projects with the goal of making profit for them. This approach represents today's faith in the tech corporations to create smart new cities that are highly profitable and can be built overnight.

== Origin ==
Since the post-World War Two era, there has been a resurgence of the trend, primarily in the Global South, of using master-planned cities to achieve national developmental, political, economic, and sociocultural goals and ideologies. However, since the 2008 recession, “smart” and “eco” technologies have become more emphasized in the design and construction of new cities in the Global South. These urban technologies and designs have been framed and fetishized in order to sell the idea of a utopian future which will, supposedly, solve current urban problems. Political and economic elites, along with some of the world's largest multinational corporations, have capitalized on the revitalized new master-planned cities phenomenon, by encouraging the use of new urban technologies in the instant development of cities in order to gain more political power and monetary profits. This “idealistic, entrepreneurial, and high-risk, high-reward” attitude towards cities being constructed from scratch rests upon techno-optimism, and the high-reward outcome of these projects often do not come into fruition.

In 2020, Hannah Rebentisch, Caroline Thompson, and Laurence Côté-Roy, and Dr. Sarah Moser coined the term “unicorn planning” to describe the techno-optimism rhetoric used by multinational corporations and economic and political elites which further enables these new smart city developments. More specifically, unicorn planning “...convey[s] the idealized expectation of overnight success, the potentially massive profits for tech and real estate companies, and the ambition to instantly invigorate local and regional economies.” High-risk is a prerequisite for many developments and businesses within the capitalist system, however, unicorn planning is of concern because it places development for profit over development for people. Therefore, unicorn planning, from the time it was developed, has been used as a critical framework for better understanding failed utopian projects such as Union Point in Boston, and further understanding the factors which influence and shape the current development of new city projects.

== Criticisms of unicorn planning ==
=== Fetishization of techno-utopian cities ===
Unicorn planning has received criticism for its fetishization of techno-utopian cities. The narrative that technology will provide a solution to our urban problems is a highly seductive one and aligns with an “ideology of progress.” This rhetoric has led to an obsessiveness or “fetishization” of this techno-utopian ideal as a solution, an economic opportunity, as well as a symbol of status in the global network. However, the critique here arises from the over-optimism towards these projects, as those who are enticed by the promises of the techno-utopian city become unaware of the implications of unicorn planning and the urban issues it perpetuates and creates. This has therefore led to a subservience of cities towards technology companies, rather than creating an urban environment where the technology serves and aids urban life.

=== High-risk, high-reward mentality and advertising ===
Another critique is the high-risk, high-reward mentality which stems from the entrepreneurial aspect of unicorn planning and is borrowed from Silicon Valley venture investor attitudes. The first implication here is the idealized expectation of overnight success which is not realistic in the sphere of urban/city planning.

=== Public-private entanglement ===
An implication of unicorn planning and new smart cities is the entanglement that occurs between private and public sectors. Due to the lack of digital literacy among public city-planning officials, the private sector often has heavy involvement in the development and management of smart cities. However, this has led to concerns surrounding threats to democracy in urban environments. Critics are concerned by a public government's willingness to transfer power of governance to private developers, also raising concerns over citizen privacy and data governance. Thus, it seems as though much of unicorn planning designs cities for the interests of the private sector.

=== Inequality ===
Some scholars, such as Agnieszcka Leszczynski and Donald McNeill, argue that the implementation of technologies in cities perpetuates inequality issues in the urban environment related to governance, society, and space given the high cost for residents to access technology-oriented systems.

=== Notable Critics ===
==== Bianca Wylie ====
Bianca Wylie, a smart city critic, has made suggestions on how to address and improve some of the issues surrounding unicorn planning. The first suggestion is to consult with citizens during the land procurement stage of development. Secondly, better education surrounding data procurement and governance is needed. Third, all data and infrastructure should be public. The fourth suggestion is to acknowledge the lack of digital literacy of major stakeholders that allow them to be so easily seduced by smart cities and technology. Finally, Wylie suggests that flexible smart cities policy should be developed immediately in order to lay the foundation, and can later be perfected.

== Examples of unicorn planning cities ==
=== Akon City, Senegal ===
Akon City (styled as AKONCITY or AkonCity) is a unicorn planned development in the middle of Cadastral de Mbodiene park, Senegal. The city, which markets itself as a, “futuristic city,” is spearheaded by R&B artist Akon who envisions a city powered by a cryptocurrency called “Akoin.” The design for the city, which as of 2021 has yet to start construction, has already been sought after by Uganda as a potential host for a second development. The development, which Akon has envisioned as a refuge for Black Americans to return to their African roots, has been criticised for its futuristic glass and steel buildings which critics claim are not suited to the region's climate.

Eko Atlantic City, Nigeria

Konza techno City, Kenya

Modderfontein New City, South Africa

Neom, Saudi Arabia

New Cairo, Egypt

Quayside (Sidewalk Toronto), Canada

=== Songdo City, South Korea ===
Songdo is a new master-planned smart city located in South Korea. The developers of the new project positioned it as a way to future-proof Asian cities. Songdo was designed on a promise of being the “world’s smartest city” with an efficient trash system, numerous parks, and a vibrant community, all wrapped in a walkable 21st century urban design. The city has sensors to monitor everything from energy use to traffic flow as an attempt to create a sustainable environment opposite of the polluted streets of Seoul. While not necessarily an example of an entirely failed unicorn planned city, Songdo sets expectations high and relies on technology and private companies to ensure the city's success. Most notably, the city's government is managed through a public-private partnership that includes private companies and various Korean municipal agencies thus relying on the city to make profit and create a potential to develop new technologies around its smart and connected communities projects.

However, residents have described that, for a high-tech city of the future, parts of Songdo feel more like a less densely populated American 1970s suburb. It was built on the promise of a high-tech urban development, governed by a semi-private system directed toward extracting profit from the new master-planned city, but the result is far from the high expectations set by the developers. The developers have since announced plans to attract biotechnology firms, with the stated aim of making Songdo "the world's best bio hub".

=== Yachay City of Knowledge, Ecuador ===
Yachay or City of Knowledge is a new master-planned city currently under development in Ecuador. The new city is being constructed in the valley of Urcuqui which is just 2 hours away from the current capital, Quito. The President, Rafael Correa of Ecuador, along with other key state actors are attempting to move away from a natural resource based economy to a knowledge based economy. To make this transition, President Rafael Correa, along with Yachay public company and the University of Yachay, have used unicorn planning to fuel the development of the project in the hopes of making this economic transition. President Rafael Correa, ‘tech experts’ and urban planners working on the project claimed that the new city would push Ecuador to become a leader in new eco-technologies, clean energy, and major environmental research. They claimed that through this process of development and using new technologies in building the city, Ecuador would attract more foreign investment and become more of an important actor on the global stage. Héctor Rodríguez, the general manager of the public company of Yachay, claimed that this university-based development would start to bloom into a lively city by 2017.

However, what Yachay currently has to show is a dead unicorn plan. Promises of Yachay having companies, start-ups and state institutions settled by 2017 have not become a reality. It is suggested that 52% of the land that was expected to be used by this development has yet to come under any construction. Instead, one can find limited signs of developed infrastructure, basic services, roads, and an industrial-knowledge centre in Yachay.
