= Canada Malting Silos =

Silo in Toronto, Ontario, Canada

General information
- Type: Silo
- Location: Toronto Ontario, Canada
- Coordinates: 43.635°N 79.396°W
- Opened: 1929

Renovating team
- Architect: ERA Architects

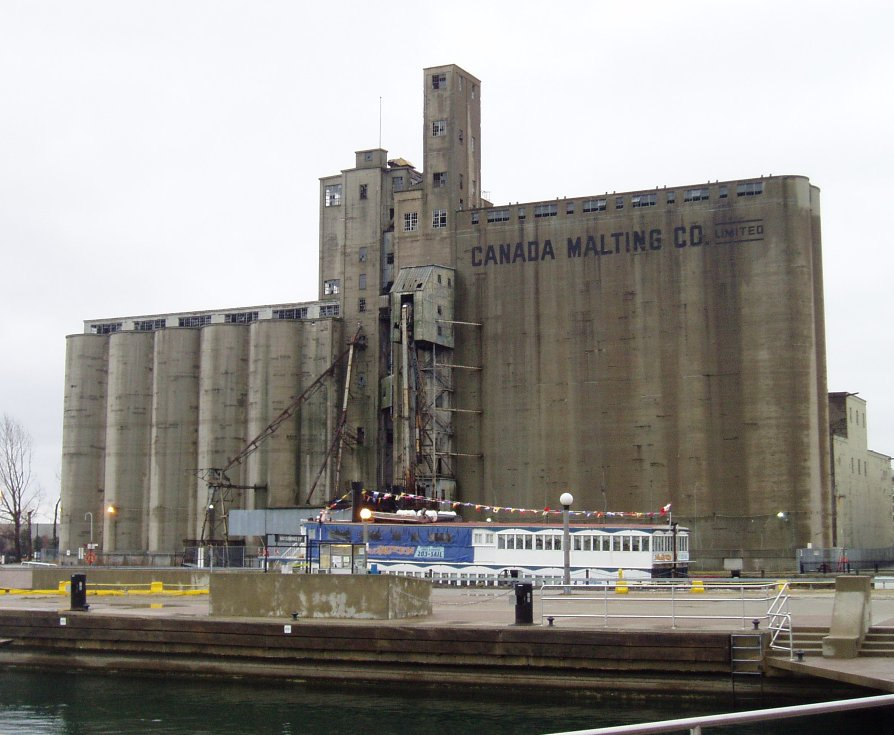
The Canada Malting Silos, pre-refurbishment

Canada Malting Silos is one of two remaining silos in Toronto's harbourfront in Ontario, Canada. Located at the foot of Bathurst Street at Bathurst Quay (Eireann Quay), the silos were built in 1928 to store malt for the Canada Malting Company. It was an important work of industrial architecture, as grain elevators had long been built out of wood, and thus were at great danger of fire. The concrete malting towers were an innovation, and the stark functionalism of the prominent building was an early influence on modernist architecture. A round office was added in 1944 and glass office was built in the original construction in 1928. The main silos, 15 in all, are 120 feet (37 meters) high and additional storage bins built in 1944 are 150 feet (46 meters) high.

The building was abandoned in the 1980s and destined for demolition, but it was designated a heritage site by the city of Toronto. A group called Metronome Canada Incorporated, led by President John Harris, hoped to convert the silos into a music museum or theme park. As of 2007, the City of Toronto was also considering it as a location for a municipal history museum.

Demolition of the germination and kiln buildings began early September 2010 with exterior refurbishment completed in 2024. The buildings were left standing with their exteriors refurbished, though as of 2026 The City of Toronto has not yet decided exactly what will be done with the space inside the silos.

== See also ==
- Canada Malting Silos, Montreal
- Victory Soya Mills Silos – still standing
- Maple Leaf Mills Silos – demolished 1983
