= Quayside, Toronto =

Coordinates: 43.646861°N 79.361790°W

Quayside
- Neighbourhood
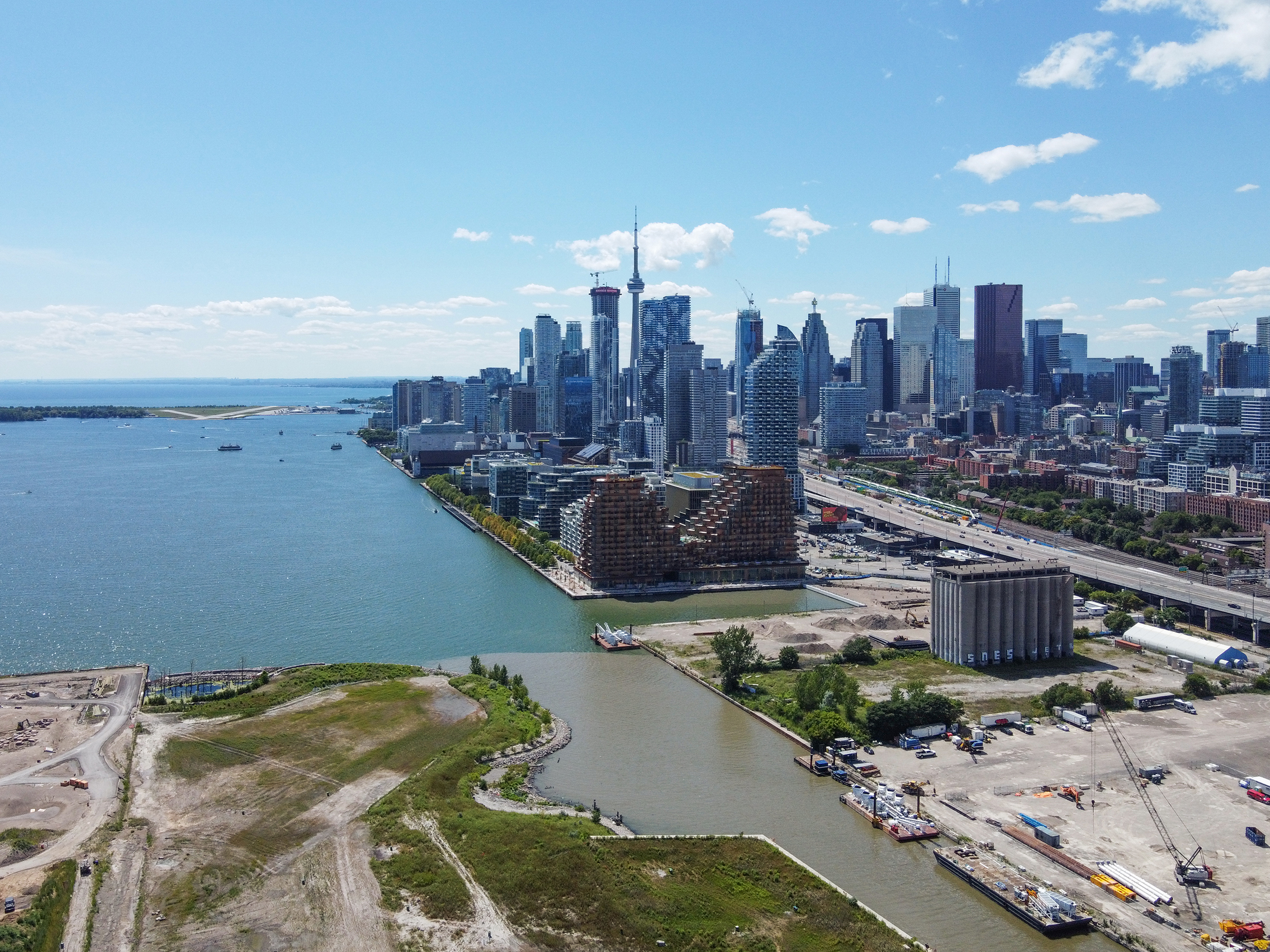
- Aerial view of Quayside in 2025
- Quayside
- Country: Canada
- Province: Ontario
- City: Toronto
- Website: https://quaysideto.ca/

Quayside is a waterfront district Toronto, Ontario, Canada, located between Queens Quay East and Parliament Street. The 4.9 hectares (12 acres) site is owned by Waterfront Toronto, the City of Toronto and CreateTO (the city's real estate agency) and private landowners. In June 2023, Waterfront Toronto proposed a new master-planned mixed-use development of the former dockland and industrial site to succeed Sidewalk Toronto, an unrealised smart city proposed by Alphabet Inc. subsidiary Sidewalk Labs.

== Site ==
The area is bounded by Gardiner Expressway to the north, Bonnycastle Street to the west, Queen's Quay East (from Bonnycastle east up the eastern side of Parliament Street Slip) and east by Victory Soya Mills Silos. While the area east of the Parliament Slip is vacant other than berthing for Toronto Harbour Cruises ships, a number of low rise businesses reside along the north side of Queen's Quay East. The parcels of land included in the project are:

- Quayside Development Block
- Parliament Development Lands
- 333 Lake Shore Boulevard East - former site of the Sunsoy Products Limited linked with the Victory Soya Mills Silos and now parking lot since 1996.

Waterfront Toronto has estimated the value of the land alone at CA$590 million.

== Sidewalk Toronto ==
The project began as a request for proposal by Waterfront Toronto in March 2017 and made official in October 2017. Sidewalk Labs committed US$50 million and one year's worth of engagement to develop a plan for execution. The two partners formed a third entity, called "Sidewalk Toronto," devoted to bringing the lakeside property to life. The agreement did not give Sidewalk Labs the right to develop land or avoid government approvals.

The project would have encouraged the use of electric vehicles and an onsite power generation station using renewable energy was planned.

The project has also attracted significant controversy, particularly relating to the terms of the agreement and also privacy concerns. The contract between Sidewalk Labs and Waterfront Toronto has been shrouded in secrecy. Board members of Waterfront Toronto, a city, Ontario and federal partnership, had only four days to review the deal to work with Sidewalk Labs for a year on development plans — before signing. Toronto city councillor Denzil Minnan-Wong, the sole city representative on the Waterfront Toronto board, has called for the agreement to be made public beyond the four-page summary that is currently available, stating "I know enough about the agreement that I think you would like to know more about the agreement." He also made a failed motion to make public the Sidewalk Labs contract at a 2017 board meeting. Privacy concerns have also been brought up by numerous experts, who note the incentives for parent company Alphabet to collect personal data from residents and visitors. Sidewalk Labs CEO Dan Doctoroff stated in 2017 that while data sharing isn’t in Sidewalk Labs’s ethos, he couldn't say with definitive certainty what would happen with the information collected in Quayside since it wasn't clear then who would own the data.

On May 7, 2020, Dan Doctoroff, CEO of Sidewalk Labs, announced the Labs would drop plans to build in Toronto. He expressed personal regret, and said he had met thousands of Toronto residents excited by the idea, attributing the decision to economic uncertainty and real-estate fluctuations.

== Quayside 2.0 ==
Waterfront Toronto issued a new request for proposal in July 2021 for a development partner for the site. On 15 February 2022, ‘Quayside Impact Limited Partnership’ (QILP), consisting of Dream Unlimited and Great Gulf Group was named as the preferred proponent. In June 2023, Waterfront Toronto along with Quayside Impact Limited Partnership submitted eight development applications to the City of Toronto to develop five Quayside blocks — 259 Lake Shore Boulevard East (Block 1 and 2) and 333 Lake Shore Boulevard East (Block 3–5). The proposed development application consisted of new mixed-use buildings containing 4,634 residential units (including 869 affordable rental units and 200 affordable ownership units) and a new public elementary school and cultural centre.

The Toronto City Council adopted a zoning by-law amendment on 24 July 2024 to permit the development of Block 1 and 2. As of August 2024, the approval for the development of Blocks 3–5 is undergoing the city's planning process. Construction is expected to begin in 2025 and be completed by 2034. The project's design team consists of architects Alison Brooks, David Adjaye, Matthew Hickey and the Henning Larsen Architects and SLA firms.

== See also ==
- Port Lands
- Corktown
- Regent Park
- St. Lawrence Market
- Waterfront Trail
