= Bianca Wylie =

Canadian smart cities critic and tech reform advocate

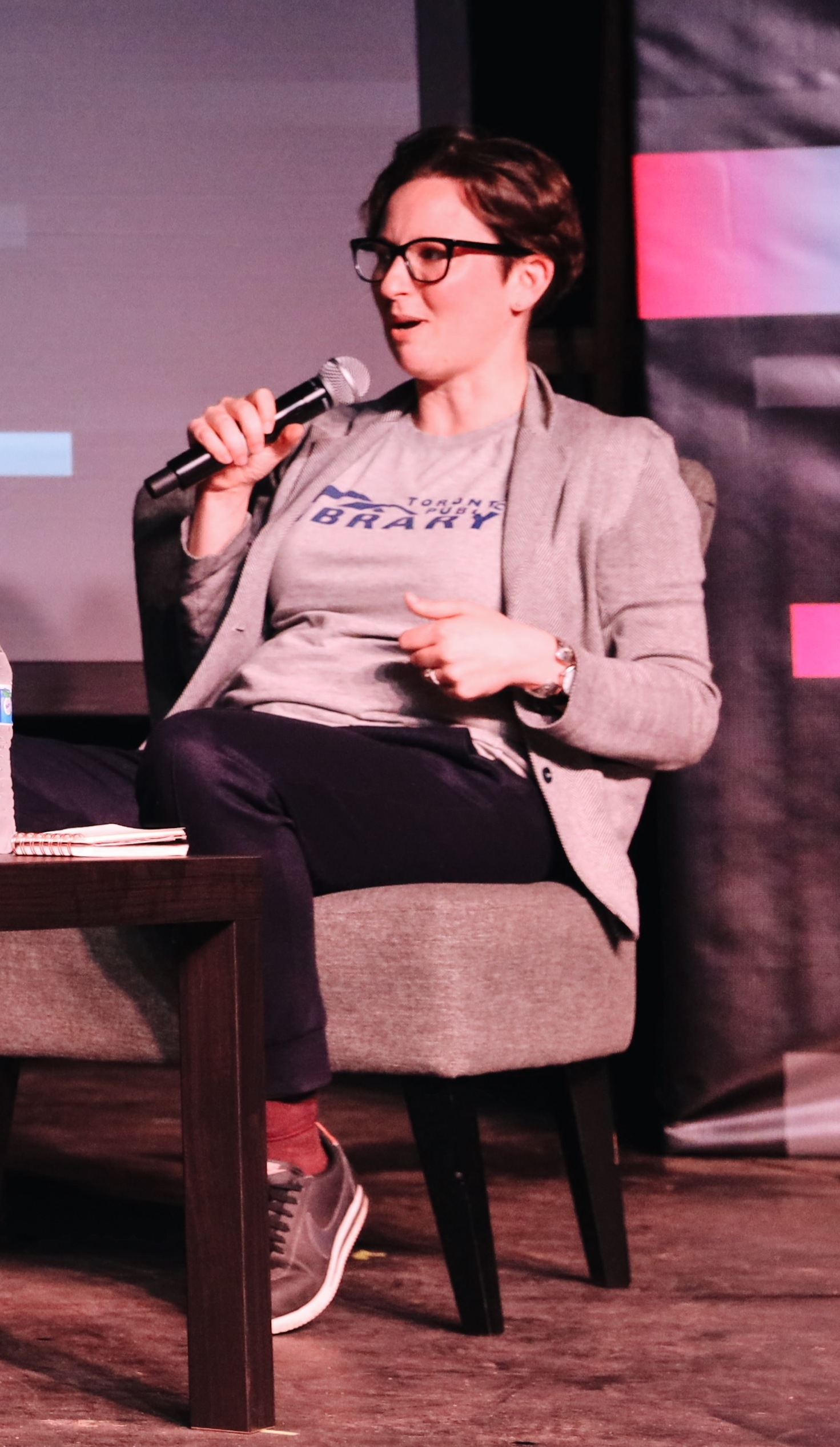
- Born: 1979 (age 46–47); Toronto, ON, Canada
- Citizenship: Canadian
- Occupations: Writer, journalist, open government advocate
- Known for: Campaign against Sidewalk Toronto

Bianca Wylie (born 1979) is a Canadian civic tech reformer, open government and privacy advocate, and writer with a background in both technology and public engagement. Wylie was the founder of the Open Data Institute Toronto and Tech Reset Canada. She is a critic of smart cities and was a leader of the campaign against Sidewalk Toronto's Quayside project.

== Education ==
Wylie graduated from York University in 2012 with a B.A in political science.

== Career ==
Wylie dropped out of her first undergraduate degree in her 20s during the dot-com boom to start a business that developed educational software. Her next job was working for an early webcasting platform where she worked on projects related to the politics of urban planning and civilian literacy on urban governance.

Wylie then worked from 2012-2016 as an associate at SWERHUN, a firm that facilitates engagement and planning consultation processes between both public and private decision makers and their constituents. That work involved Wylie in conversations about data privacy and government. In 2014, Wylie founded the Toronto chapter of the Open Data Institute, which ran until 2019. The Open Data Institute is a volunteer-run non-profit that supports the use of open data in public policy, civic tech, civic education, and political engagement. After that, Wylie worked from 2016-2018 as an associate at Open North, a non-profit organization focused on open data for government and organizations. From 2016-2018, Wylie also taught at the Schulich Executive Education Centre at York University about achieving open government through accountability, transparency, and open data. In 2017, she co-founded the advocacy group Tech Reset Canada, which supports investment in the technology capacity and expertise of the public sector.

Wylie has worked on think tanks and projects related to tech reform and data privacy including positions as a former senior fellow at the Centre for International Governance Innovation, as an advisory board member at the Computational Democracy Project, and as an advisory board member at Electronic Privacy Information Center. She has contributed to news websites including the Boston Review, VICE, The Globe and Mail, and Toronto life, as well as publishing her work on Medium.

== Block Sidewalk Campaign ==
Wylie was a leader of the campaign to block the Sidewalk Toronto smart city development project in the Quayside neighborhood on the Toronto Waterfront. The project was planned by Sidewalk Labs, a company related to Google. It was announced in October 2017 and eventually cancelled in May 2020.

Wylie used her background in open government and public planning consultation to help to lead a group of citizens in a campaign called #BlockSidewalk. The impetus for the campaign was an article in the Toronto Star that shared leaked documents suggesting that Sidewalk Labs were not being transparent about the extent of their plans for the Toronto waterfront. Wylie’s criticisms of the proposed project were based in a concern that the project was blending the roles of government and corporations. In particular, she spoke out about the lack of democratic consultation on the project, the lack of digital literacy displayed by government actors, and the need for governments to be stewards of private data. She argued that "data produced by the public should be publicly owned and managed transparently." Wylie further argued that governments need to write policy protecting private data as technology becomes increasingly involved in cities and governments.

Wylie authored dozens of newspaper articles and blog posts and spoke with Toronto City Council and the Canada House of Commons to raise awareness about Sidewalk Toronto. She also spoke at conferences such as ReSite in Prague. Wylie's work on Block Sidewalk gained media attention, and she was referred to as the "Jane Jacobs of smart cities."
