= Maple Leaf Mills Silos =

Silo complex in Toronto, Ontario, Canada

Coordinates: 43.6378°N 79.3881°W

Maple Leaf Mills Silos was one of two silo or grain elevator complexes that were built in the area between Spadina Quay and Maple Leaf Quay, on Toronto Harbour, in Toronto, Ontario, Canada. It was one of three "monumental" silo complexes that dominated the city's waterfront.

Built in 1928, the silos marked an age when goods were being shipped into Toronto. Towards the end, the silos also marked the port's decline and the desire to remove the industrial eyesore along Toronto's waterfront. They were demolished in 1983.

The silos were located south of Queens Quay on Maple Leaf Quay, between the Peter Street and Rees Street slips.

== History ==
Before construction of the fourth Welland Canal, prairie grain was shipped to lakeports such as Collingwood or Midland, transferred to rail car, and delivered to Toronto - a laborious process. Gordon C. Leitch realized when the canal opened, he would be able to ship grain directly to the Toronto waterfront at considerable efficiency. With the help of businessman James Playfair he founded Toronto Elevators and in 1928 constructed a 2 million bushel capacity concrete grain elevator complex. The first silo structure was built by Carter Construction Company, and was referred to as Playfair Elevators. C.D. Howe was involved in the design. The capacity was later doubled. Six tracks next to the elevators were connected to the CN Fleet Street Yard. Offices and laboratories also occupied the site.

Originally mainly a storage elevator, Toronto Elevators got into processing with the Masterfeeds animal feed manufacturing business, managed by Fred Presant. Entering the oilseed business, by 1953, two Toronto plants, Toronto Elevators and Victory Soya had approximately 90% of Canadian Soya processing capability. The combined storage capacity was more than Canada's other four processors combined.

To supply grain to his elevator, Leitch invested in shipping, partnering with James E. Norris. They eventually created one of the largest shipping companies on the Great Lakes, Upper Lakes Shipping Company. The Norris family also had an interest in Maple Leaf Milling. Toronto Elevator Company merged with Maple Leaf Milling in 1961, and the company and silos were renamed Maple Leaf Mills.

The site is sometimes referred to as the Monarch Mill; Monarch was the brand name of flour produced by MLM, and was prominently featured on the side of the silos. The brand is today owned by J.M.Smucker. MLM also owned a mill in the Junction area of Toronto.

After labour disputes involving "waterfront warlord" Hal C. Banks at ULS in the 1960s, culminating in the bombing of the SS Howard L. Shaw (today one of the breakwater ships at Ontario Place), the Norris family grew disenchanted with the partnership. After a fight for control, involving Neonex and Jim Pattison, the partnership split, with the Leitch family gaining control of the shipping business, and Norris, Maple Leaf Mills. Lawsuits over the Neonex bid took 13 years to settle, and almost bankrupted Pattison.

When Maple Leaf Mills facility at Port Colborne was destroyed by fire in 1960, milling operations came to Toronto. The Port Colborne facilities were rebuilt at a smaller scale, but it eventually took over milling operations after 1983.

After numerous sales, mergers and divestitures, MLM became Maple Leaf Foods. The Masterfeeds business was divested and is today owned by Alltech.

== Decline of Toronto Harbour and demise of the silos ==
With the decline in use of Toronto harbour as a shipping centre in the 1980s and redevelopment of the waterfront, the future of the silos was set.

The Federal government expropriated the Maple Leaf complex in 1972 as part of the Harbourfront scheme. Unlike the Victory Soya Mills Silos and the Canada Malting Silos, which were designated heritage structures, the Maple Leaf Silos were demolished in the 1983 in the haste to remove the industrial eyesore and blight along the waterfront. Demolition took a full year, cost $1 million, and bankrupted the Thunder Bay wrecking company. The site now is home to HTO Park.

With the closure of the Toronto site, MLM moved production to other locations, among them Cavan, Ontario (later as Masterfeeds and now as a unit of Alltech) in 1975.

== Renewal ==
In 1989, Harbour Terrace condominiums was completed on half of the old silo site, but the remaining half of the site sat vacant. In 2000, Toronto Fire Services Station 334 and Toronto EMS Station 36 was opened at the southwest end of the site

Ironically, the new buildings that replaced the silos at 350 and 390 Queens Quay were "maligned as among the worst examples of a concrete curtain dividing Toronto from Lake Ontario" and described as "drab, puke-coloured edifices" The residences at the Maple Leaf Quay were renovated in 2015, a project led by architect Les Klein.

After two decades the city facilitated the creation of HTO Park West in 2007 and thus completed the revitalization of the entire site.
