= Pink House (Melbourne Beach, Florida) =

The Pink House
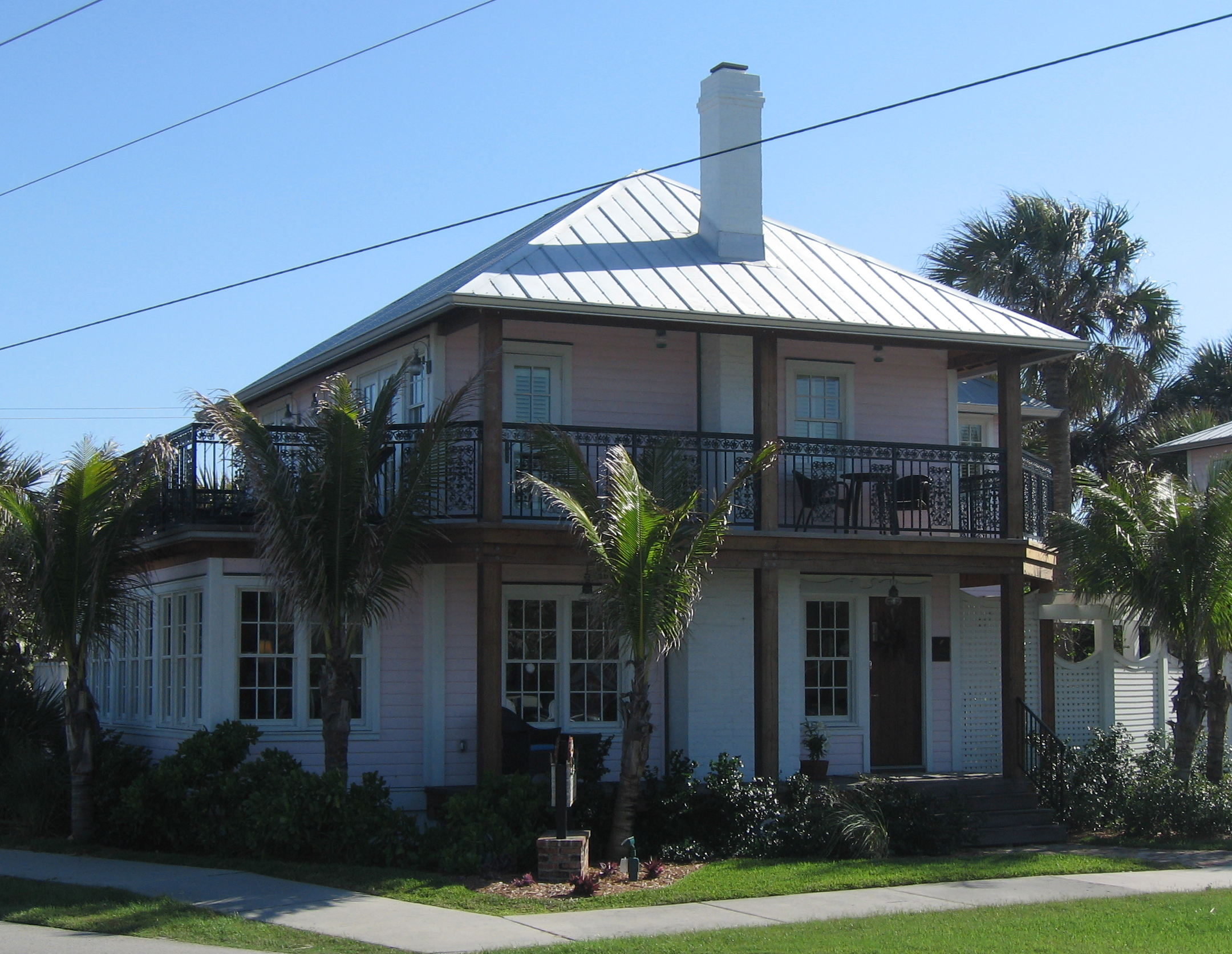
- Interactive map of the The Pink House area

General information
- Type: Cypress Wood
- Architectural style: Key West Style
- Location: 201 Ocean Avenue; Melbourne Beach, Florida
- Coordinates: 28.068047°N 80.557644°W
- Construction started: 1916
- Governing body: Port D’Hiver Bed and Breakfast

Technical details
- Floor count: 2

The Pink House, historically known as the Walter Brown House or the Pinky's Brown House, is a historic house and landmark at 201 Ocean Avenue, Melbourne Beach, Florida, United States.

== History ==
Built in 1916 by Neffie S. Long on land originally owned by the Melbourne Beach Improvement Company. Florence Peel purchased it in 1922. In 1925, it became the winter home of Walter Brown and his wife Ella Belle, who named the house "Port d'Hiver" (Port of Winter). The Brown's summered in Vermont. The population of Melbourne Beach in 1910 was 30 people and a water wheel power plant was installed in 1915 at the beginning of Ocean Avenue. The house was sturdy with cypress shingles. Walter Brown served as a cavalry instructor at the Kentucky Military Institute, which had its cantonment in Eau Gallie. Later, Brown became a relator working at the Brown House Hotel on New Haven Avenue in downtown Melbourne.

As the area developed, the house served as a hotel across from the Melbourne Beach Casino, which became a focal point for the town, and was used as the petty officers club for the Naval Air Station Melbourne during World War II. The casino was built in 1924 on site of the town bathhouse. In December 1925, at the intersection of Ocean Avenue and Atlantic Street, where the house is located, was site of the first recorded motor vehicle accident in the area as two Ford Model Ts collided. The intersection was also the site of the town's second stop sign and at the time, and the road (now Florida State Road A1A) turned into a sand trail two blocks to the south.

The house was also a law office, frat house for Florida Institute of Technology and an antique shop.

After four years of renovations, it reopened on December 6, 2007 as part of the Port D'Hiver Bed and Breakfast. The renovations also included the old "Carriage House", which was formerly an art studio, as well as the addition of two new buildings on the property. The four buildings are in the Key West style, after the Marquesa Hotel. The Walter Brown House is the centerpiece of the renovated complex. The pink house is one of the remaining landmarks of early Melbourne Beach.
