= Pink House (Montreal) =

Guerilla art project in Montreal, Canada

Coordinates: 45.4686°N 73.58839°W

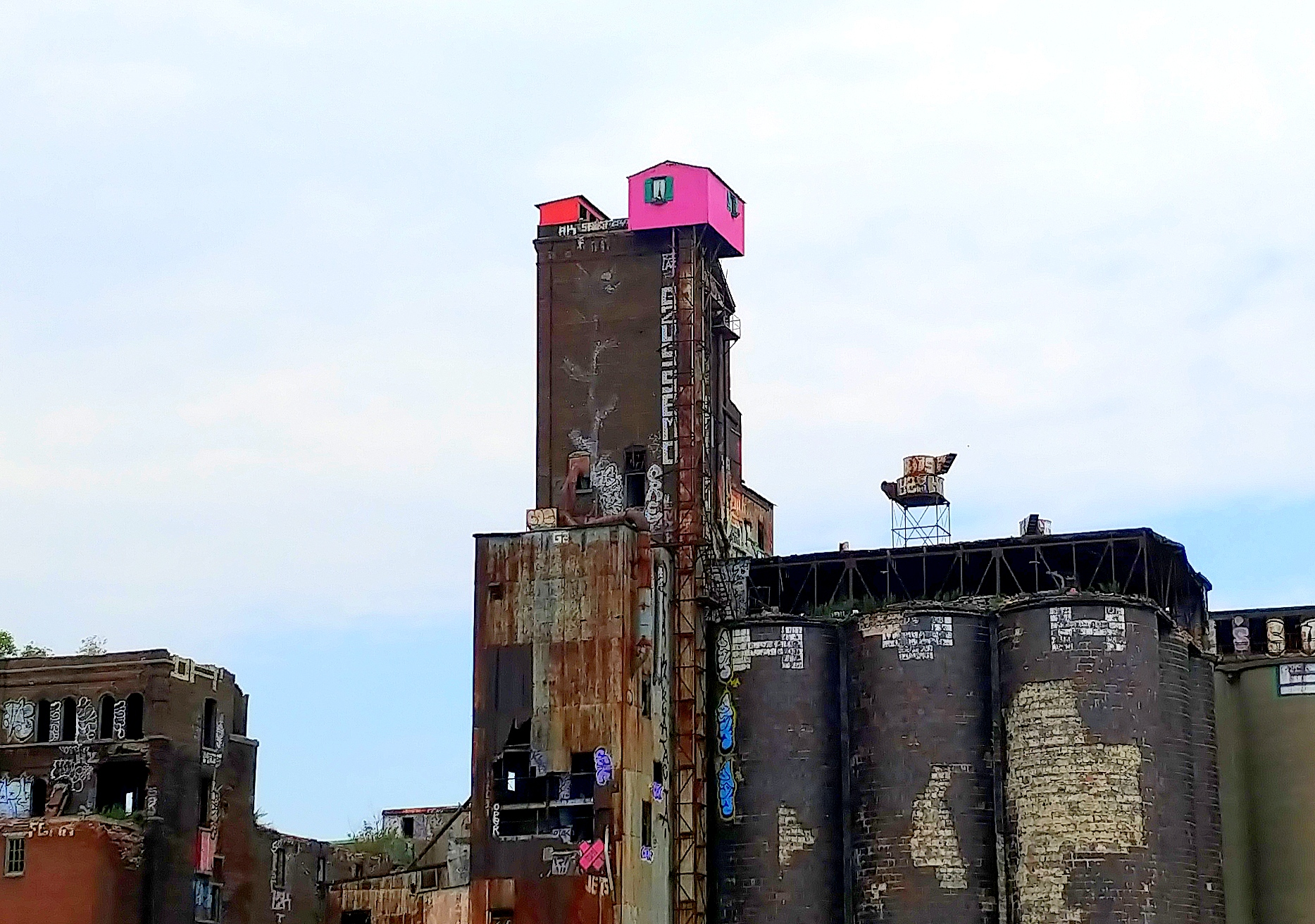
The Pink House in 2020

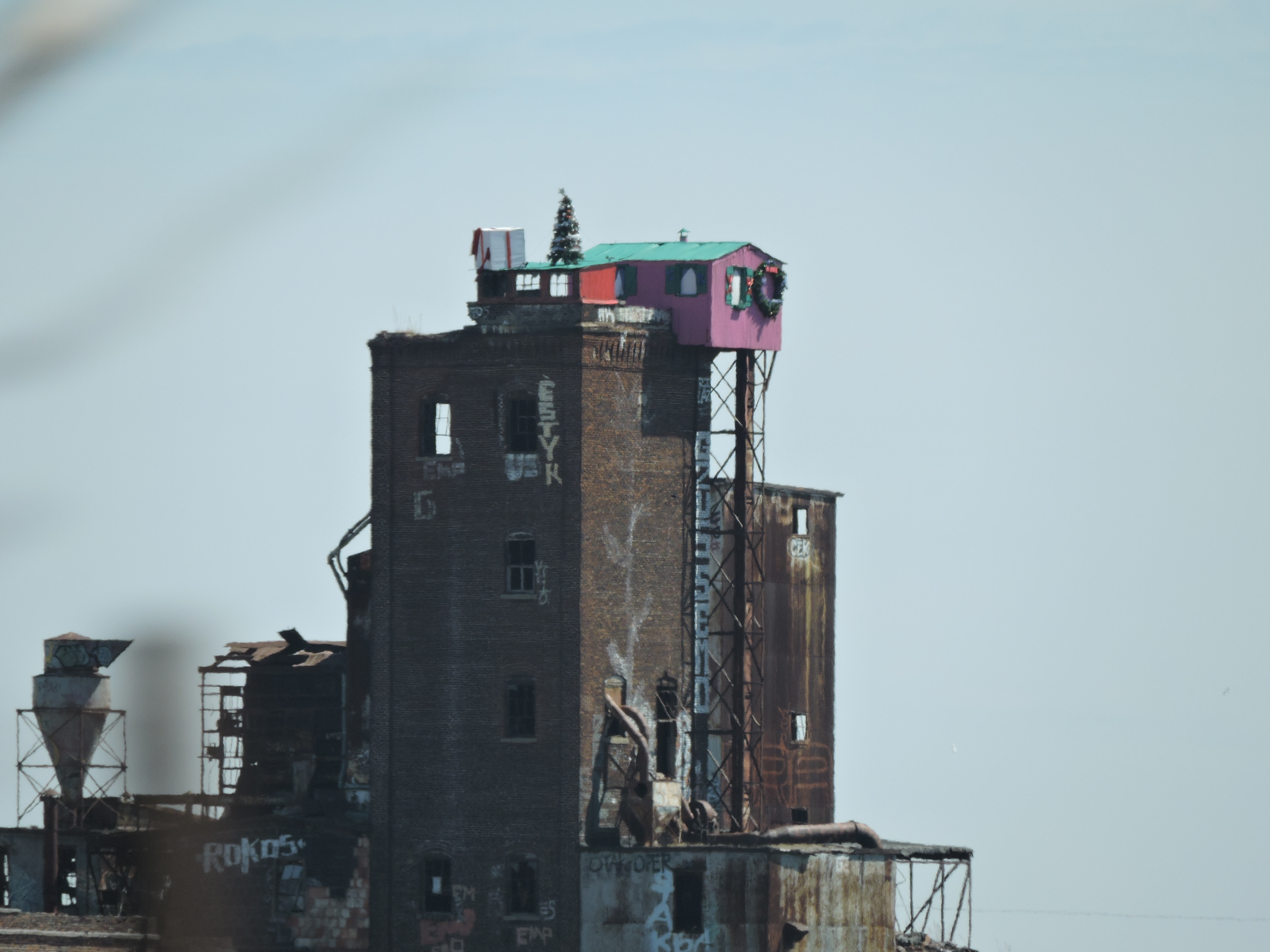
The Pink House in 2025

Close-up of the structure beneath the Pink House, viewed from the ground, October 2026

The Pink House (French: Maison Rose) is a guerrilla art project in Montreal, Canada, where unknown individuals ascended a grain silo attached to an abandoned factory, and decorated the control cabin there to resemble a house. Located on the site of the former Canada Malting factory alongside the Lachine Canal the House was first painted bright pink in October 2019. Subsequent additions have included green shutters, curtains, window boxes, a Christmas tree, and a giant gift box labeled "À: Saint-Henri, De : Little Pink" ("To St-Henri, from: Little Pink"); as well, the adjacent control cabin has been painted bright red. In 2020, the Montreal police stated that they only investigated abandoned buildings in response to complaints from neighbours and proprietors, and that no complaints had been filed regarding the Pink House. La Presse has reported finding a videographer who claims to have been approached by the artist responsible for the Pink House; the videographer states that the artist refuses all contact with journalists.
