= Sidewalk Toronto =

Urban development project in Toronto, Ontario, Canada

Coordinates: 43.646861°N 79.361790°W

Sidewalk Toronto was a cancelled urban development project proposed by Sidewalk Labs at Quayside, a waterfront area in Toronto, Ontario, Canada. The project was first initiated by Waterfront Toronto in 2017 by issuing the request for proposal (RFP) for development on the Quayside area. Sidewalk Labs, a subsidiary of Google (formerly its parent company Alphabet Inc.), issued the winning bid in 2017. The Master Innovation Development Plan (MIDP) was created in 2019 through conversations with over 21,000 Toronto residents and had aimed to be an innovative reinvention of Toronto's neglected eastern downtown waterfront.

Alphabet had announced the cancellation of the project on May 7, 2020. Sidewalk Toronto had aimed to utilize technology to create a smart urban area that improves the quality of life of its residents, while also using it as a testing ground for future urban design projects and technology. The high-tech plan drew criticism, particularly over data privacy issues regarding the robust data collection in the proposed community. Alphabet cited economic concerns caused by the uncertainty of the economy experiencing the COVID-19 pandemic.

== History ==
=== Request for proposal (2017) ===
Waterfront Toronto holds the right to develop the eastern downtown area of the Toronto waterfront, as the directing agency of the waterfront lands. In March 2017, Waterfront Toronto issued a request for proposal (RFP) to solicit bids for an "Innovation and Funding Partner" that would assist the organization with the planning for the future development of a 4.9 hectares (12 acres) mixed-use mixed-income project called the Quayside development. The development was envisioned as a pilot project for Toronto's future urban planning as a world-class city. The RFP set objectives to meet C40 Climate Positive sustainability, test cleantech building materials, provide 500–800 units of affordable rental housing, establish a complete community with open public spaces and strong links to adjacent neighborhoods, develop information infrastructures to aid decision-making and attract innovative businesses and talent, and secure funding and investment partnerships. The innovation and funding partner was expected to invest from short-term pre-development research and planning, and could be offered the opportunity to continue to work with Waterfront Toronto in future phases of work, helping to fund infrastructure and pilot projects.

Sidewalk Labs won the RFP in October 2017 and officially launched Sidewalk Toronto. According to their press release, their plan was to "design a new kind of mixed-use, complete community" and apply new digital technology to "create people-centered neighborhoods." Sidewalk Labs committed US$50 million to work with Waterfront Toronto to develop a plan for the Quayside neighborhood and test pilot projects that could potentially be used in Toronto or elsewhere. They began working on a Master Innovation and Development Plan (MIDP) to form the basis for the Quayside development.

Sidewalk Labs' bid had proposed features such as roads optimized for self-driving vehicles, creation of a test-bed for developing future urban planning ideas, and fully integrated physical and digital layers of the urban system. This digital layer would have managed a repository of data and provided an application programming interface for third-party developers. As the planning work progressed, there was an interest in relocating Google's Canadian headquarters to Quayside, and creating 2,500 net new jobs at Google Canada.

== Development plan ==
In the agreement between Waterfront Toronto and Sidewalk Labs, they established eleven different areas of focus, referred to as "pillars" to develop the plan:

- Mobility: A mixed mobility environment where motor traffic can be mixed with cycling and walking
- Public realm: Stimulating public activity to work on public spaces
- Buildings: Creating adaptable and flexible building modules
- Community & city services: Connecting people through digital technologies that allow them to communicate better and empower the community
- Sustainability: Creating climate-positive communities that pursue negative carbon emission.
- Digital platform: Creating a digital layer that can be integrated with the physical layer from the first place.
- Privacy & data governance: Creating robust use-cases of data governance and considering privacy as a major concern.
- Pilots/early actions: Research and development pilots and technology use-cases to collect long-term vision of Waterfront Toronto and Sidewalk Labs.
- Housing Affordability: Provisioning adequate affordable housing units in Quayside and creating a mixed-used income community.
- Economic development & urban innovation institute: Establishing an urban innovation institute to foster job creation and economic development of the Quayside area.
- Development & planning: Creating a "pillar" initiative to foster integrated planning in the development process.

A public engagement plan sought feedback from Toronto residents through a series of public talks and round-table meetings, engagement in design, and online engagement.

Additionally, Sidewalk Labs had established its own core principles to guide its projects:

- "No tech for tech's sake:" To not highlight the technology side of urban development, being "interested only if it has a clear impact on solving urban problems and realizing the promise of dense urban communities".
- "Respect privacy:" As a central matter, they introduced the privacy by design framework of Ann Cavoukian to account for privacy throughout the design and building process.
- "Believe open standards:" Using open standards which enable diverse stakeholders to easily access data and technology.
- "Strength through diversity:" Considering the demographic diversity of Toronto to promote a concept of "complete communities."
- "We cannot do this alone:" Engaging in continuous discussions with stakeholders to improve the process and gain support.

=== Sidewalk RFP submission ===
Sidewalk Labs' RFP submission envisioned urban planning in five layers. These were the physical layers of utility infrastructure, transportation infrastructure, the public realm and buildings, plus a digital layer which enabled the physical layers to be more efficient and adaptable. According to the proposal:

- Utility channels below the public spaces would house conduits for electric wires, waste, and water, and allow access for maintenance without disrupting roadways or public spaces. The waste management system would use autonomous trash collection robots and a pay-as-you-throw metering system to encourage reduced consumption.
- Buildings would use a proposed outcome-based zoning system. A system of embedded sensors providing real-time monitoring and automated regulation would allow the zoning code in the mixed-use environment to be changed dynamically, according to criteria such as maximum noise level or air quality.
- Transportation infrastructure was planned around adaptive roads and street lights. A self-driving electric shuttle was anticipated to attempt to make the streets more accessible.
- The public realm was proposed to use a "robust system of asset monitoring" to track usage patterns and change the usage designation on demand, such as temporarily changing bicycle lanes to a pedestrian lane-way.

=== Civic data trust ===
There had been numerous critics concerned of Orwellian privacy control with the Sidewalk project due to the nature of the public systems created. As a result of criticism about the privacy of residents and commodification of data collection, Sidewalk Labs shifted their direction for constructing the digital layer, introducing the concept of a civic data trust.

In an October 2018 press release, Sidewalk Labs renounced the right to own information generated from Quayside. The release argued that "urban data" – community data cleared of personal information – should be considered as a public asset and be freely available. They proposed that the data should be owned and managed by an independent civic data trust, which would steward the data collected in the physical layers of the planned development, and approve and control its collection and dissemination. The proposed trust would be guided by a charter ensuring that data is collected and used in a way that is beneficial to the community, protects privacy, and spurs innovation and investment. If a company wanted to collect or use the data for more proprietary or commercial purposes, or it required personally-identifiable information, approval should be required from the trust.

Sidewalk Labs provided examples of data repositories in other cities: In Barcelona, collected data is pooled into a central repository and access is managed by the city; in Estonia, companies store their own collected data but make it available via standardized protocols.

=== Data governance ===
In November 2019, Sidewalk Labs delivered a "Digital Innovation Appendix" to provide real-world examples and flesh out data governance plans for the project, including "responsible artificial intelligence" guidelines and data minimization and clearing of personal data by default. They also incorporated feedback giving Waterfront Toronto the lead on data governance, rather than an independent Urban Data Trust. In February 2020, Waterfront Toronto endorsed 144 of 160 innovation proposals from Sidewalk Labs, saying the other 16 could be dropped, altered or replaced. Waterfront Toronto's advisory panel stated that it was premature to provide advice, and had concerns about the feasibility of some innovations proposed within the project, and desired more clarity on the benefits that might justify the proposed collection and use of data. They subsequently requested additional context for Sidewalk Toronto's earlier allegations regarding data security.

=== Criticisms ===
According to open-government advocate Bianca Wylie, the fundamental problem of this project is the smart city model itself. She argues that the model is formulated because "corporations are seeking to exert influence on urban spaces and democratic governance." She claims that not just Sidewalk Labs, but elected officials and politicians of Toronto considered the plan as a way of boosting the economy and brand the city as a world leader supported by a leading tech company. Moreover, she argues that these kinds of development projects, especially digital government projects, have been considered as stable financial revenue for the companies involved. By embedding a technical product in a government system, it would be extremely difficult to pull out from the system, thus making the government market highly attractive.

There have also been various criticisms about the proposed civic data trust. Opposing the argument that data cleared of personal information is safe to be publicly available, a study published in Science has found that this data can be restored to its original state when a dataset is associated with different datasets. If a company gained access to that public data, then only the company would earn the revenue.

In November 2019, in response to feedback, the proposal for data governance was shifted from recommending an independent Urban Data Trust, to vesting authority in the existing Waterfront Toronto government partnership.
