= Victory Soya Mills Silos =

Coordinates: 43.647089°N 79.359119°W

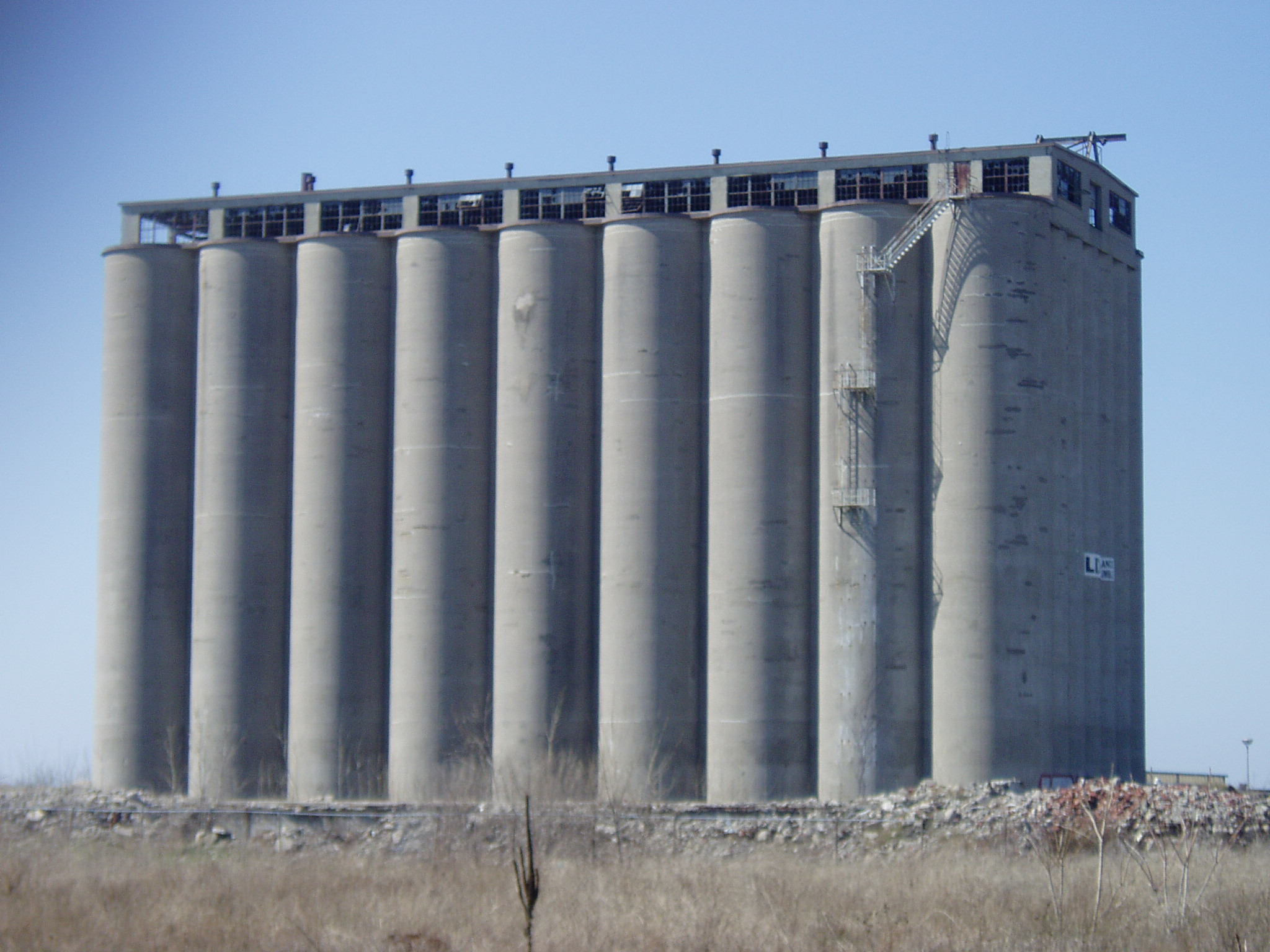
The now derelict Victory Soya Mills Silos

Victory Soya Mills Silos are abandoned soybean storage silos in Toronto, Ontario, Canada. The silos are located at the east end of Toronto Harbour, part of a soybean processing facility that operated from 1944 until 1991. The silos are of two remaining silos from Toronto's industrial port era.

== History ==
The silos were built for Canadian Breweries' soya processing plant in 1944. The silos were used to store the soybeans reprocessed for a variety of purposes (pet food, animal feed, vegetable oils, etc...). In 1954 the mills were sold to Procter & Gamble and named Victory Soya Mills. It was purchased by Central Soy Incorporated in 1980 and renamed Central Soya Mills in the 1980s.

The plant ceased operating in 1991. Sorting silos along the east side Parliament Slip, the tall headhouse tower, and other structures were demolished in 1998, leaving the remaining silos in place. At one time, it was the property of Home Depot for a planned box store, but it has remained vacant other than the silos. It was once used illegally as a "tent city" by Toronto's homeless population.

The building was added to Toronto’s City’s Heritage Registre in 2004.

Although a heritage site, there are no plans to renovate or reuse the building. The buildings are located in the planned Keating Channel Precinct residential neighbourhood as well as the planned Quayside, Toronto development which will occupy the site next to the silos.

== See also ==
- Canada Malting Silos - the other silo still standing in Toronto (1928–1987)
- Maple Leaf Mills Silos - site of former silos Toronto Elevators from 1928 to 1983 (demolished)
