= Lake Shore =

Lake Shore or Lakeshore may refer to:

== Places ==
- Lakeshore, Ontario, Canada
  - Lakeshore (provincial electoral district)
- Lakeshore, California (disambiguation), the name of several places in the U.S.
- Lakeshore, Florida, U.S.
- Lake Shore, Jacksonville, Florida, U.S.
- Lakeshore, Louisiana, U.S.
- Lake Shore, Maryland, U.S.
- Lake Shore, Minnesota, U.S.
- Lakeshore, Mississippi, U.S.
- Lakeshore/Lake Vista, New Orleans, U.S.
- Lake Shore, Utah, U.S.
- Lake Shore, Washington, U.S.
- Lake Shore Drive, an expressway in Chicago, Illinois, U.S.
- Lake Shore Boulevard, a road in Toronto, Ontario, U.S.
- Lake Shore Mine, a gold mine in Kirkland Lake, Ontario, Canada

== Businesses and organisations ==
- Lakeshore Entertainment, an American film company
  - Lakeshore Records
- Lakeshore High School, in Mandeville, Louisiana
- Lake Shore High School, in St. Clair Shores, Michigan
- Lake Shore High School (Angola, New York)
- Lakeshore Hospital, in Kochi, Kerala, India

== Other uses ==
- Lake Shore Limited, a long-distance passenger train between Chicago and New York
- Lakeshore, Bristol, a building in England
- Lake Shore Gill, an American botanist
- Lakeshore SC, a Canadian soccer club
- WYIN, an Indiana PBS station also known as Lakeshore PBS

== See also ==
- Shore of a lake
- Lake Shore Drive (disambiguation)
- Lake Shore Railway (disambiguation)
- List of national lakeshores and seashores of the United States
