= Ashbridge's Bay =

Bay in Toronto, Ontario, Canada

Coordinates: 43.659334°N 79.310925°W

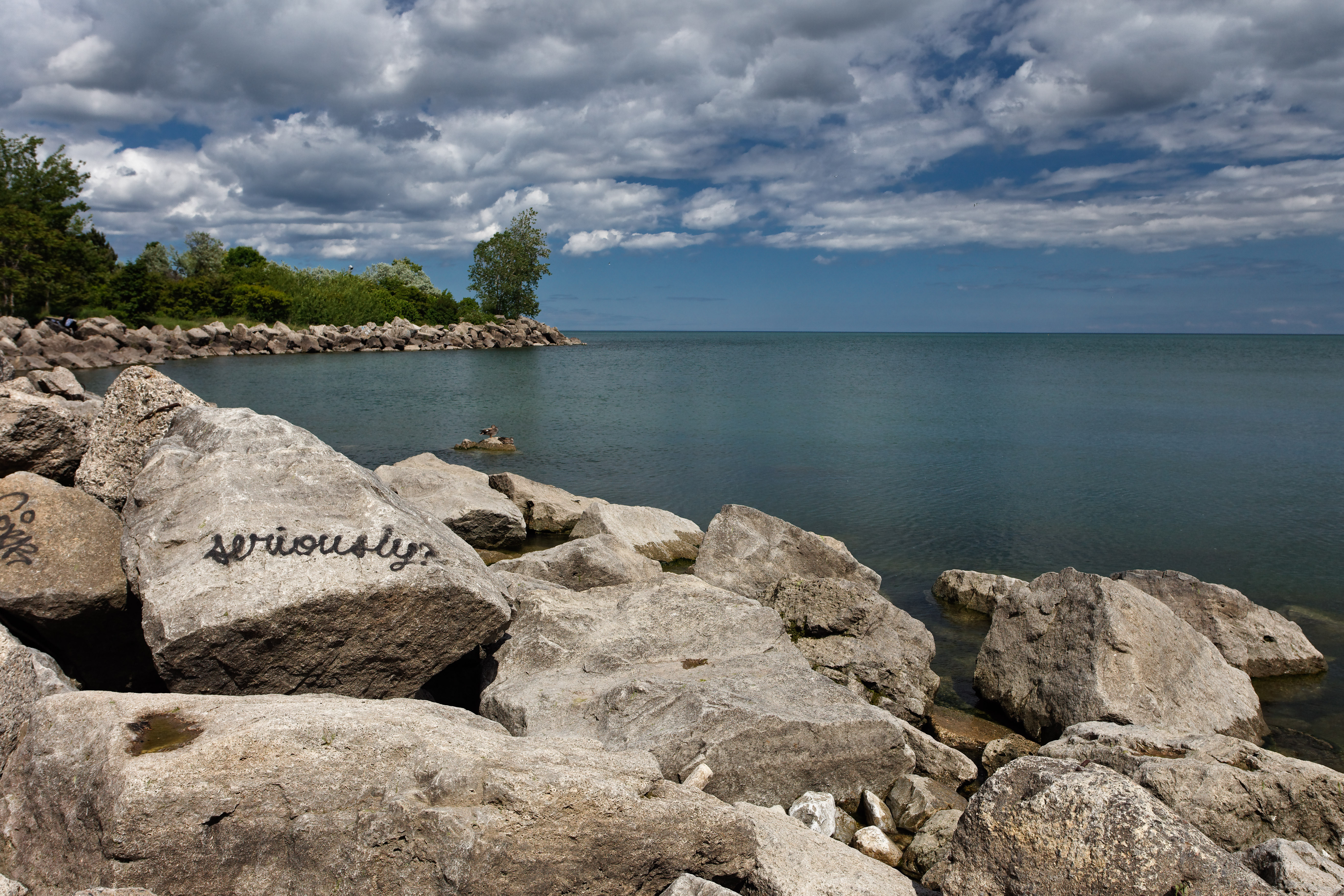
Rock graffiti at Ashbridges Bay

Ashbridges Bay is a bay and park in Toronto, Ontario, Canada. It is located along Lake Shore Boulevard next to Woodbine Beach in the Beaches. The Martin Goodman Trail and boardwalk run through the park along the bay. The boardwalk runs 3 kilometres (1.9 mi) from Ashbridges Bay in the west to the R. C. Harris Water Treatment Plant in the east along Lake Ontario. It was once part of the marsh that lay east of Toronto Islands and Toronto Harbour.

== History ==
=== Namesake ===
The bay is named for Sarah Ashbridge, a British loyalist from Philadelphia whose family once lived nearby on a farm. It was once a five square kilometre marsh on the Don River delta and one of the largest wetlands in Eastern Canada.

A breakwall formed on the western end with an outlet into Toronto Bay.

=== Fisherman’s Island and reclamation ===
Unwin Avenue follows the former sandbar or chain of islands once called Fisherman’s Island that once sheltered the bay from the western end of the current Inner Portlands to beyond Leslie Street to near Woodbine Avenue where an outlet once existed. During its existence as the sandbar was home fishing community (fish huts and homes) along with St. Nicholas Anglican Church, a school as well as 35 homes from 1911 to 1924. Historically it was a sandbar peninsula when Toronto Islands was still linked as 5.5 miles (8.9 km) long by 0.25 miles (0.40 km) wide landform.

Before 1900, the bay was used to obtain ice during the winter months. These operations stopped after the bay became polluted to the point the water became unsafe:

- Samuel Hill's Ice House at Leslie Street and Eastern Avenue
- Graham's Ice House at Lake (now Knox) and Eastern Avenue
- Martin McKee's Ice House at the foot of Carlaw Avenue (now an infill area near Lake Shore Boulevard)

Due to industrial development and sewage disposal into the marsh, in 1910 a Toronto Board of Trade proposal for Ashbridges Bay was for an industrial district for industrial offices and sites served by railway lines, public warehouses alongside docking facilities south of Keating Channel to the Eastern Gap and a parkland/recreational strip at the south end. In 1912, the Toronto Harbour Commission drained it and reclaimed the land. The Ashbridges Bay Reclamation Scheme was the largest engineering project in North America at that time, filling in an area from Cherry Street to Leslie Street to create the Port Lands Industrial District and building the Ashbridges Bay Wastewater Treatment Plant. When it was completed in the 1920s, only a fragment of the original Ashbridges Bay remained, and the mouth of the Don River had been dramatically altered, instead flowing through the Keating Channel. The bay's size was shrunk to the area between the Port Lands and Woodbine Beach.

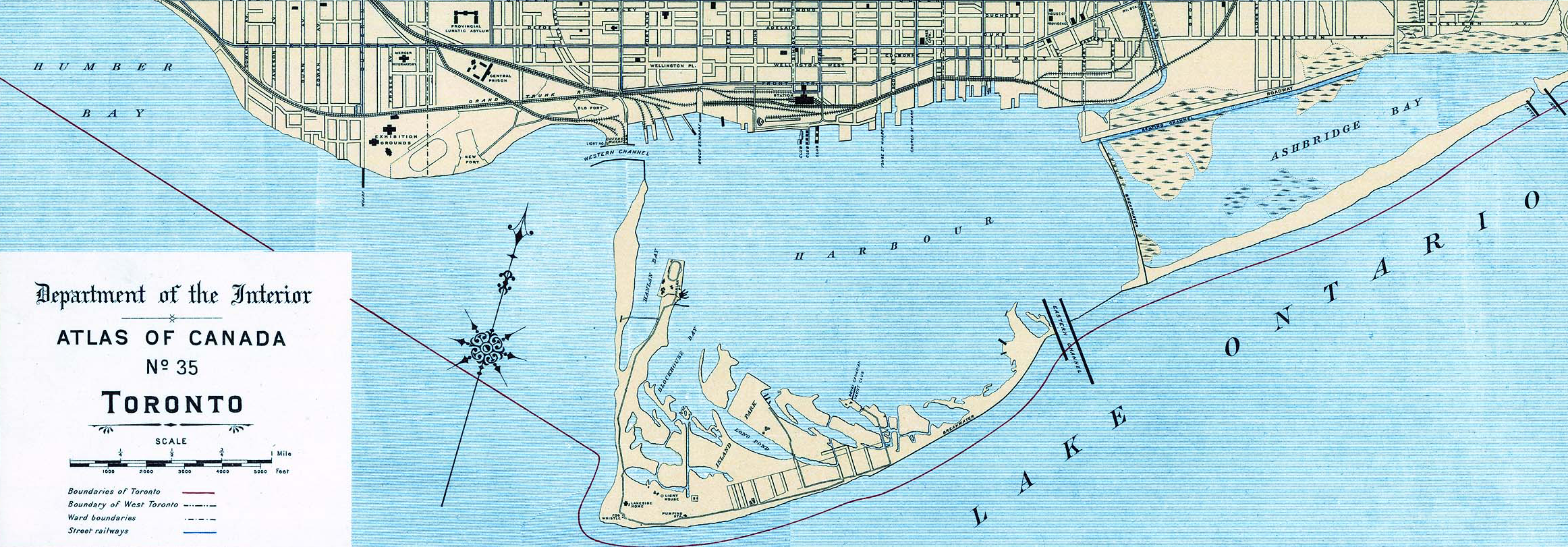
Map of the harbour in 1906 before the infilling of Ashbridge's Bay

Ashbridges Bay Park opened in 1977. In the early 2000s, the park was improved by Waterfront Toronto, including the building of a skateboard park. The current bay is surrounded by marinas, the treatment plant, and a small tree-lined section along Lake Shore Boulevard East such that the original natural shoreline has disappeared completely. Ashbridges Bay is also a popular location for fireworks on Canada Day and Victoria Day. Cherry Street Beach is the old remaining portion of the sandbar.
