= Lake Shore Drive (disambiguation) =

Lake Shore Drive is a roadway in Chicago, Illinois.

Lake Shore Drive or Lakeshore Drive may also refer to:

== Transportation ==
- Lake Shore Drive (Grosse Pointe) or Jefferson Avenue, a scenic road in the Detroit metropolitan area in Michigan
- Lake Shore Drive, part of County Route 16 in Suffolk County, New York
- Lakeshore Drive, New Orleans, a street in Lakeshore/Lake Vista, New Orleans
- Tennessee State Route 375, known as Lakeshore Drive

== Popular culture ==
- Lake Shore Drive (album), a 1973 album by Aliotta Haynes Jeremiah
  - "Lake Shore Drive" (song)
- "Lake Shore Driving", a song by Duran Duran from the 1988 album Big Thing

== See also ==
- Lake Shore Drive Bridge (disambiguation)
- M-185 (Michigan highway) or Lake Shore Road, Mackinac Island, Michigan
- Lake Shore Boulevard, Toronto, Canada
