= Woodbine Beach =

Beach in Toronto, Ontario, Canada

Woodbine Beach Park
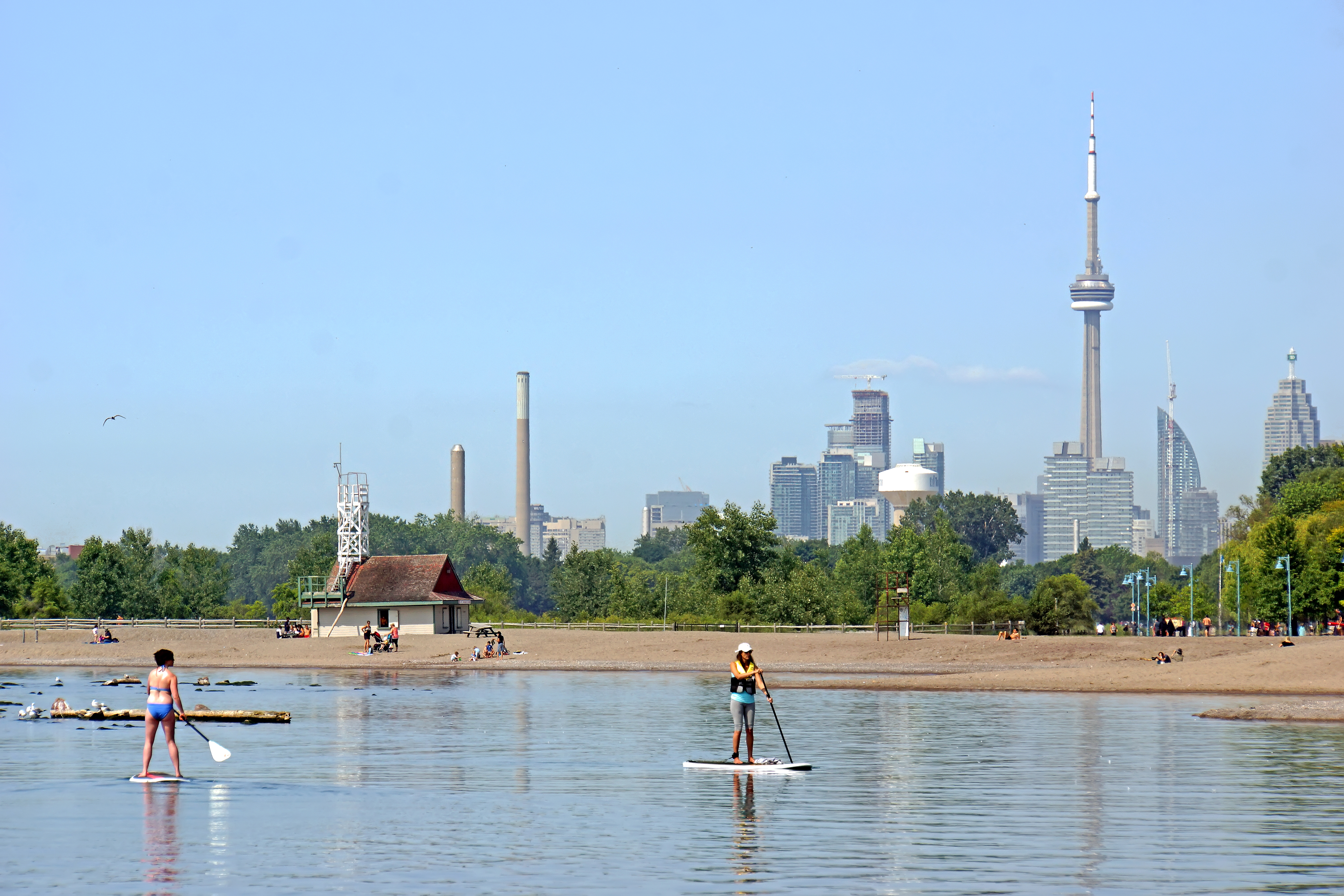
- Woodbine Beach in July 2014

- Location within Toronto
- Type: Park and beach
- Location: Toronto, Ontario
- Coordinates: 43.662470°N 79.307492°W
- Area: 15.2 hectares (38 acres)
- Created: 1950
- Operator: City of Toronto

Woodbine Beach is situated along Toronto waterfront's with Lake Ontario and is the largest beach in Toronto. It is located in the Beaches neighbourhood of Toronto, south of Lake Shore Boulevard at the foot of Woodbine Avenue, and is next to Ashbridge's Bay and Kew-Balmy Beach. Woodbine Beach, together with Kew Balmy Beach and Balmy Beach Park, formed the eastern shoreline of Old Toronto.

The beach is part of Woodbine Beach Park, a larger recreational area that features a boardwalk and the Martin Goodman Trail that runs parallel to the shoreline.

== History ==
The area around Woodbine Beach was once a cottage community in a similar style to the communities on the Toronto Island, today it is a popular beach. Until Lake Shore Boulevard was extended to Woodbine Avenue in the 1950s, Woodbine Beach was not a bathing beach, but rather a wooded area known as 'The Cut'. Woodbine Beach and neighbouring Ashbridge's Bay are a popular place to visit to see the fireworks for Victoria Day. There are over 90 volleyball courts, and various outdoor leisure activity rentals, such as bicycles, canoes, kayaks, and standup paddle boards. Next to the beach is the Donald D. Summerville Outdoor Olympic Pool, an outdoor elevated Olympic-sized swimming pool, overlooking the beach. Construction for the pool started in 1961, and it was designed to add temporary scaffolding for the spectator seats in the event Toronto was to ever host the Olympics. The Martin Goodman Trail runs along the boardwalk.

== Maintenance and water quality ==
Woodbine Beach and Kew-Balmy Beach are Blue Flag certified for cleanliness and are suitable for swimming, with this distinction being awarded to Woodbine since 2005. The beach is maintained by Toronto Parks, Forestry and Recreation. Since 1990, the quality of the water and sand has improved dramatically. The water quality at the beach is tested daily, and is clean to swim on most days, including after storms. In addition, the sand is machine groomed daily. Besides, the terrain is gentle to far offshore, and there is not much seaweed, which is ideal for swimming. However, water temperature can be highly unpredictable. While warm water around 20C can often be experienced from July to early September, occasionally water temperature can drop to the lower teens celsius for days, due to upward swirl of chilly deep-lake water known as upwelling, which is driven by strong westerly wind (thus unrelated to air temperature).
