= The Beaches, Toronto =

The Beaches
- Neighbourhood
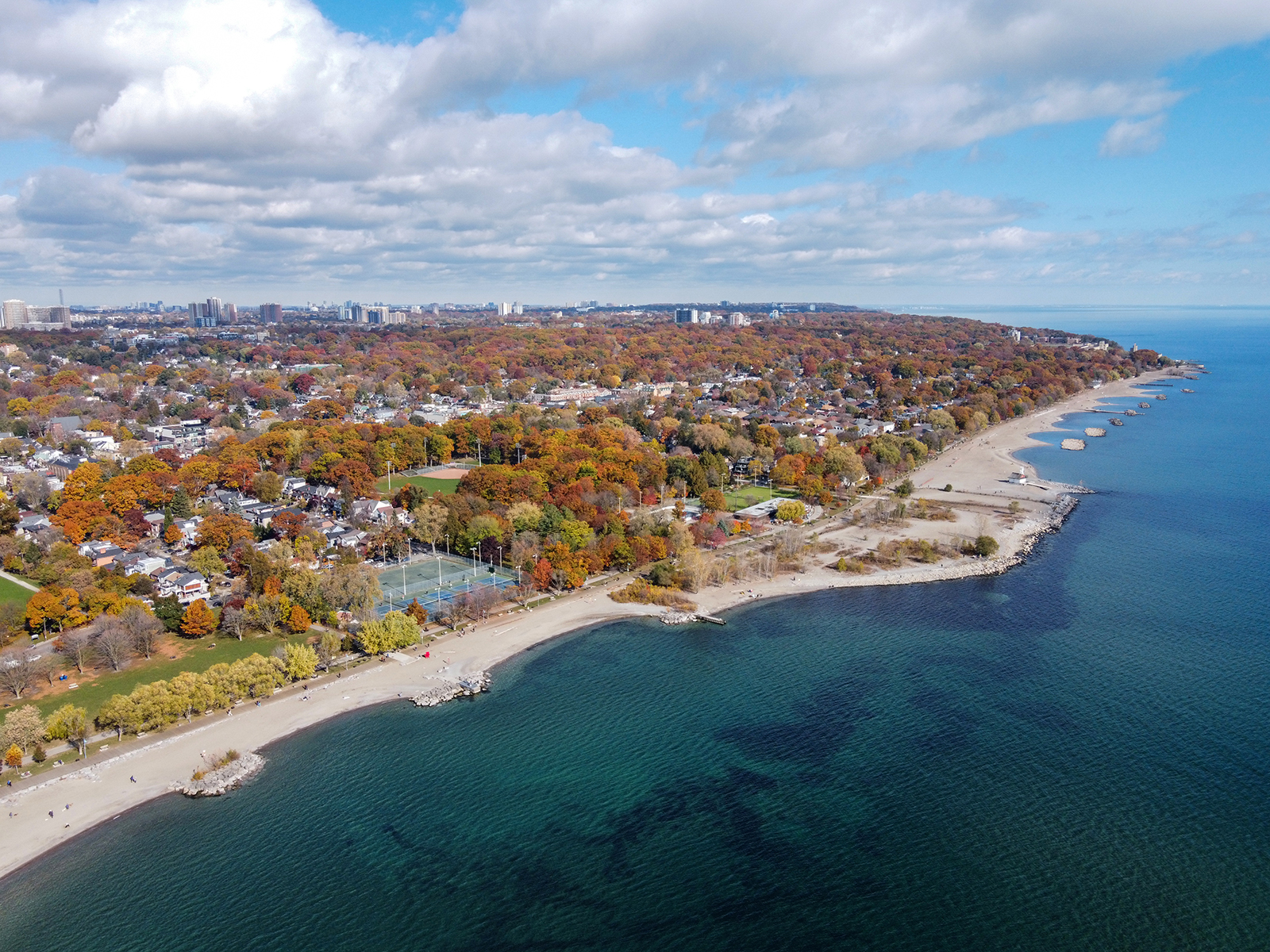
- Aerial view of the Beaches in 2023

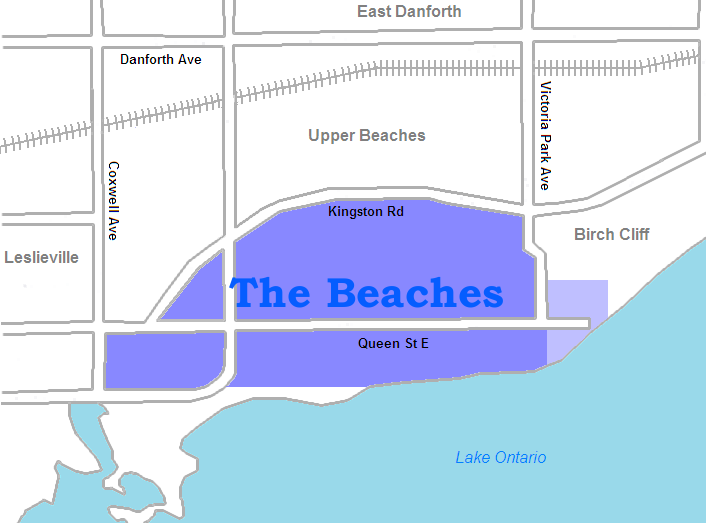
- Vicinity

- Location within Toronto
- Coordinates: 43°40′02″N 79°17′50″W
- Country: Canada
- Province: Ontario
- City: Toronto

Government
  - City Councillor: Nathaniel Erskine-Smith
  - Federal M.P.: Tanveer Shahnawaz
  - Provincial M.P.P.: Mary-Margaret McMahon

The Beaches (also known as "the Beach") is a neighbourhood in Toronto, Ontario, Canada. It is so named because of its four beaches situated on Lake Ontario. It is located east of downtown within the "Old" City of Toronto. The approximate boundaries of the neighbourhood are from Victoria Park Avenue on the east to Kingston Road on the north, along Dundas Street to Coxwell Avenue on the west, south to Lake Ontario. The Beaches is part of the east-central district of Toronto.

== Character ==
The commercial district of Queen Street East lies at the heart of the Beaches community. It is characterized by a large number of independent speciality stores. The stores along Queen are known to change tenants quite often causing the streetscape to change from year to year, sometimes drastically.

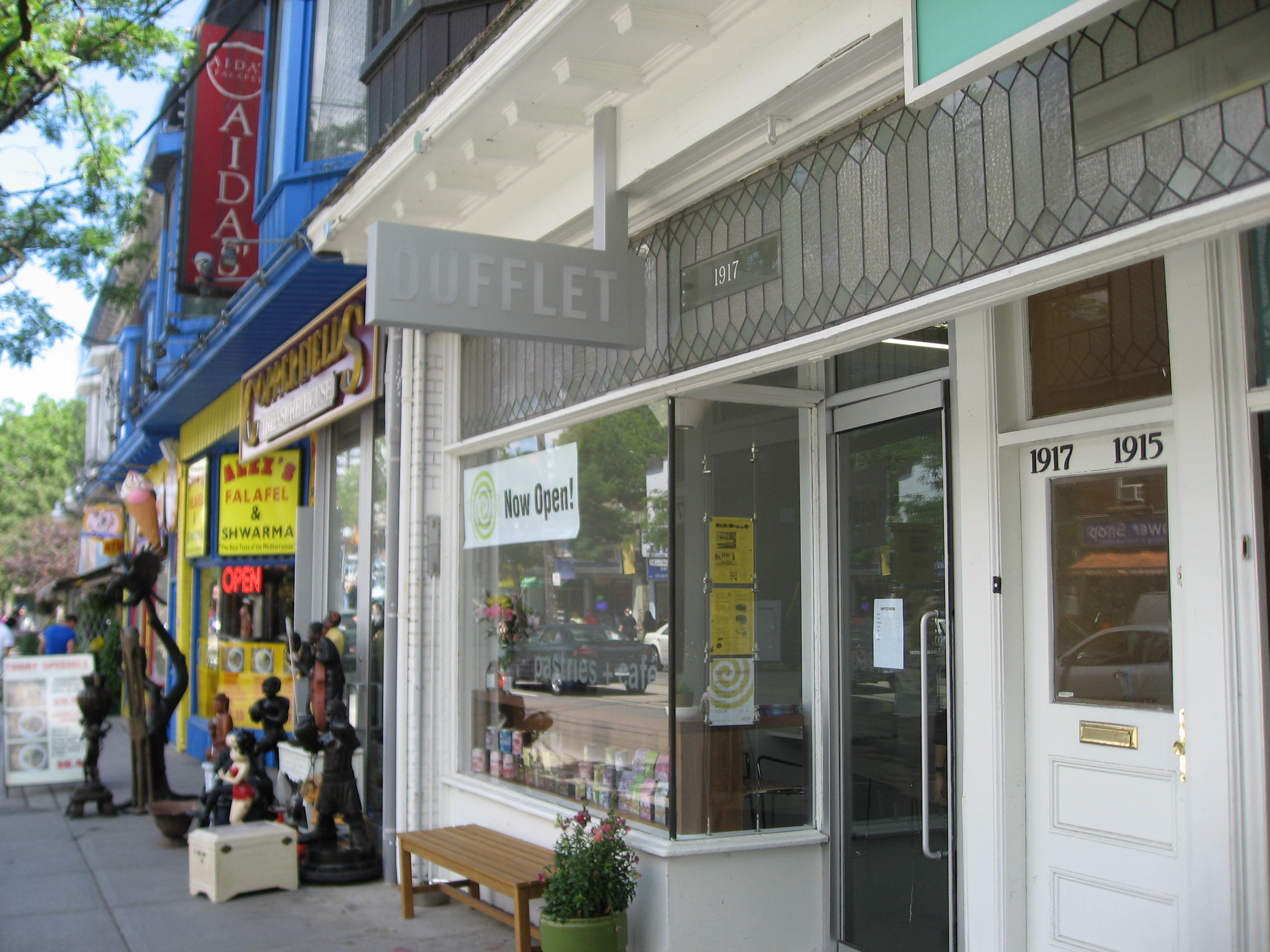
The Beaches is characterized by a large number of independent boutiques along the neighbourhood's portion of Queen Street East.

The side streets are mostly lined with semi-detached and large-scale Victorian, Edwardian, and new-style houses. There are also low-rise apartment buildings and a few row-houses. Controversy has risen in recent years over new development in the neighbourhood that is changing the traditional aesthetic, with denser housing causing some residents to protect the traditional cottage-like appearance of the homes with heritage designations for some streets.

There is an extensive park system along the Waterfront (with Kew Gardens being the only one that extends up to Queen Street) as well as a parks that follow a ravine (partially buried) that bisects the neighbourhood from North to South at Glen Manor Road. Kingston Road is a four-lane road along the northern section of the neighbourhood. Woodbine Avenue is a five-lane road originating from Lake Shore Boulevard at the Lake Ontario shoreline, running north. It is primarily residential.

The beach itself is a single uninterrupted stretch of sandy shoreline bounded by the R. C. Harris Water Treatment Plant (locally known as the water works) to the east and Woodbine Beach Park (a small peninsula in Lake Ontario) to the west. A long boardwalk runs along most of its length with a portion of the Martin Goodman Trail bike path running parallel. Although it is continuous, there are four names which correspond each to approximately one quarter of the length of the beach (from east to west): Balmy Beach, Scarboro Beach, Kew Beach and Woodbine Beach. Woodbine Beach and Kew-Balmy Beach are Blue Flag certified for cleanliness and are suitable for swimming. The park and beach areas of the neighbourhood are known to be animal friendly and offer both on and off-leash dog parks. The neighbourhood also serves as a home to Toronto wildlife. Most recently, Woodbine Beach has become a home to a family of red foxes that have made their den underneath the boardwalk.

In the 2006 Canadian census the Beach was covered by census tracts 0020.00, 0021.00, 0022.00, 0023.00, and 0024.00. According to that census, the neighbourhood has 20,416 residents, a 7.8% increase from the 2001 census. Average income is $67,536, well above the average for Toronto.

=== Location ===
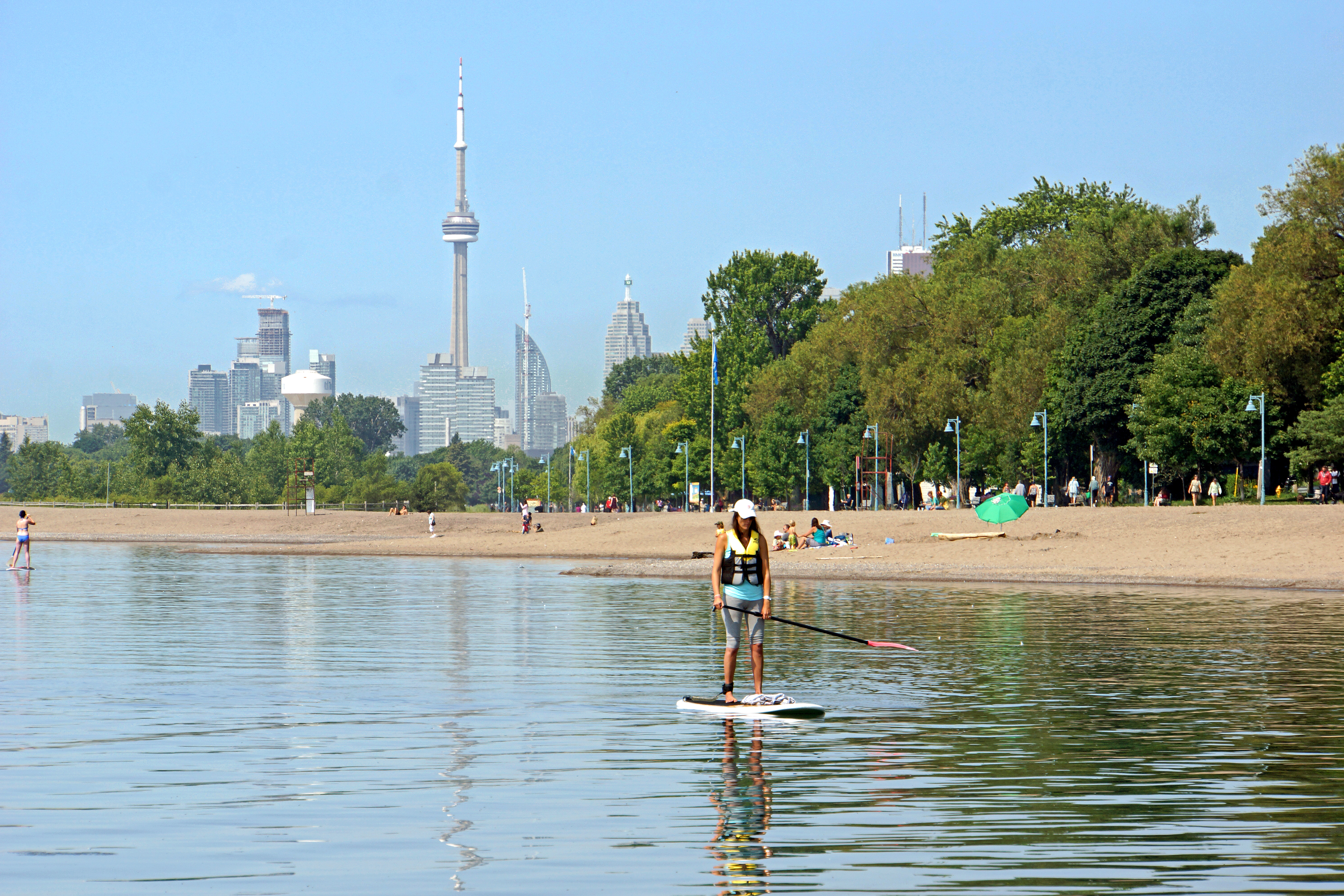
View of Woodbine Beach, one of the four beach sections that make up the neighbourhood's waterfront.

The neighbourhood is located to the East of Toronto's downtown, from Coxwell east to Victoria Park. The lakefront is divided into four sections; Woodbine Beach to the west, Kew Beach and Scarboro Beach in the centre, and Balmy Beach to the east. It is four beaches which give the neighbourhood its name and defining principal characteristic. Until Lake Shore Boulevard was extended to Woodbine Avenue in the 1950s, Woodbine Beach was not a bathing beach, but rather a desolate wooded area known as The Cut. And Woodbine Avenue was the western boundary of the neighbourhood. While the official City northern boundary ends at Kingston Road, the area to the north has become known as the 'Upper Beaches' according to real estate marketers. The area bounded by Queen Street, Woodbine and Kingston Road is nicknamed the 'Beach Triangle'.

==== Ashbridge's Bay ====
Ashbridge's Bay is a small body of water that was once part of the marsh that lay east of Toronto Islands and Toronto Harbour. The bay is named for the Ashbridge family that once lived nearby on a farm. Infill to form the Port Lands and building of the water treatment plant shrunk the size of the bay to the area between the Port Lands and Woodbine Beach. The current bay is surrounded by marinas, the treatment plant and a small tree lined section along Lake Shore Boulevard East such that the original natural shoreline has disappeared completely.

=== Name ===
The name of the community is the subject of a long-standing dispute. Some long-time local residents assert that "the Beach" is the proper historical name for the area, whereas others are of the view that "the Beaches" also has at least equal historical provenance and is additionally the more universally recognized neighbourhood name, particularly by non-residents. All government levels refer to the riding, or the ward in the case of the municipal government, as Beaches-East York. As well, for research and information management purposes, the City of Toronto government officially categorizes the neighbourhood as "the Beaches".

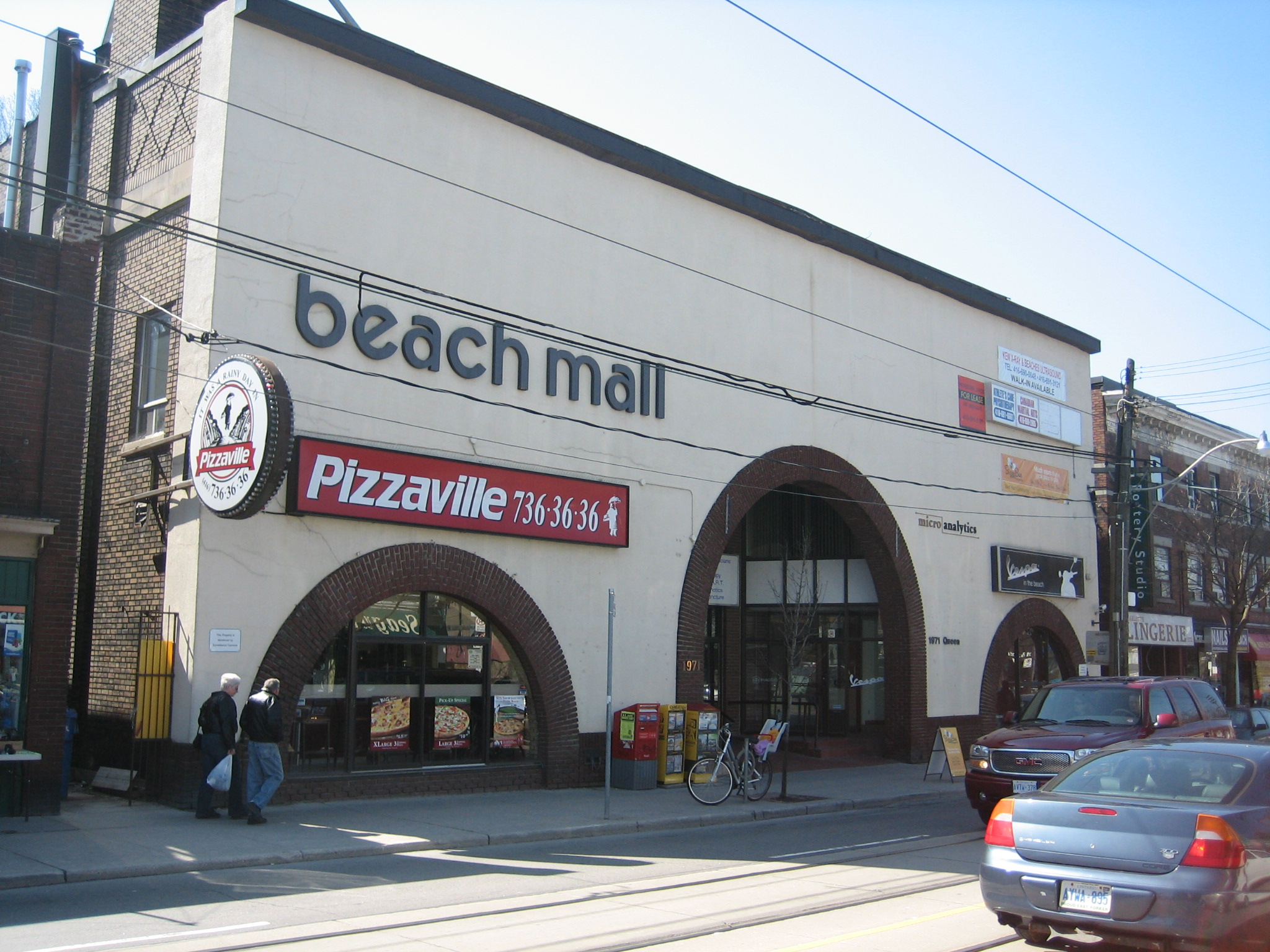
The former Beach Theatre, presently Beach Mall. A long-standing issue in the community has been the area's name, whether its proper name is "the Beach" or "the Beaches".

The dispute over the area's name reached a fever pitch in 1985, when the City of Toronto installed 14 street signs designating the neighbourhood as "the Beaches". The resulting controversy resulted in the eventual removal of the signs, although the municipal government continues to officially designate the area as "the Beaches". In early 2006 the local Beaches Business Improvement Area voted to place "the Beach" on signs slated to appear on new lampposts over the summer, but local outcry caused them to rescind that decision. The Beaches Business Improvement Area board subsequently held a poll (online, in person and by ballot) in April 2006 to determine whether the new street signs would be designated "the Beach" or "the Beaches", and 58% of participants selected "the Beach" as the name to appear on the signs.

In fact, the two names have been used to refer to the area since the first homes were built in the 19th century. In his book, Accidental City: The Transformation of Toronto, Robert Fulford, himself a former resident, wrote: "the historical argument for 'the Beaches' as a name turns out to be at least as strong as the historical argument for 'the Beach'". "Pluralists" hold that since the area had four distinct beach areas, using the singular term is illogical. Those preferring the singular term "Beach" hold that the term has historically referred to the area as the four distinct beach areas merged.

Historically, there are or were a number of institutions that used the term "Beach" in the singular, including the original Beach telephone exchange (1903 - 1920s), the Beach Hebrew Institute (1920), the Beach Theatre (1919 to the 1960s), and the Beach Streetcar (1923–1948). The singular form has also been adopted by the local historical society, which is called the Beach and East York Historical Society (from 1974). There are also numerous examples of early local institutions that use the plural form "Beaches", such as the Beaches Library (1915), the Beaches Presbyterian Church (1926), the Beaches Branch of the Canadian Legion and a local war monument in Kew Beach erected post WWII by the "Beaches Business Men's Association".

In May 2009, the City of Toronto started the installation of "the Beach" signs along Queen Street.

Despite the naming controversy, most Torontonians recognize either name as referring to this particular neighbourhood, even though there are several other beaches located elsewhere in the city.

== History ==
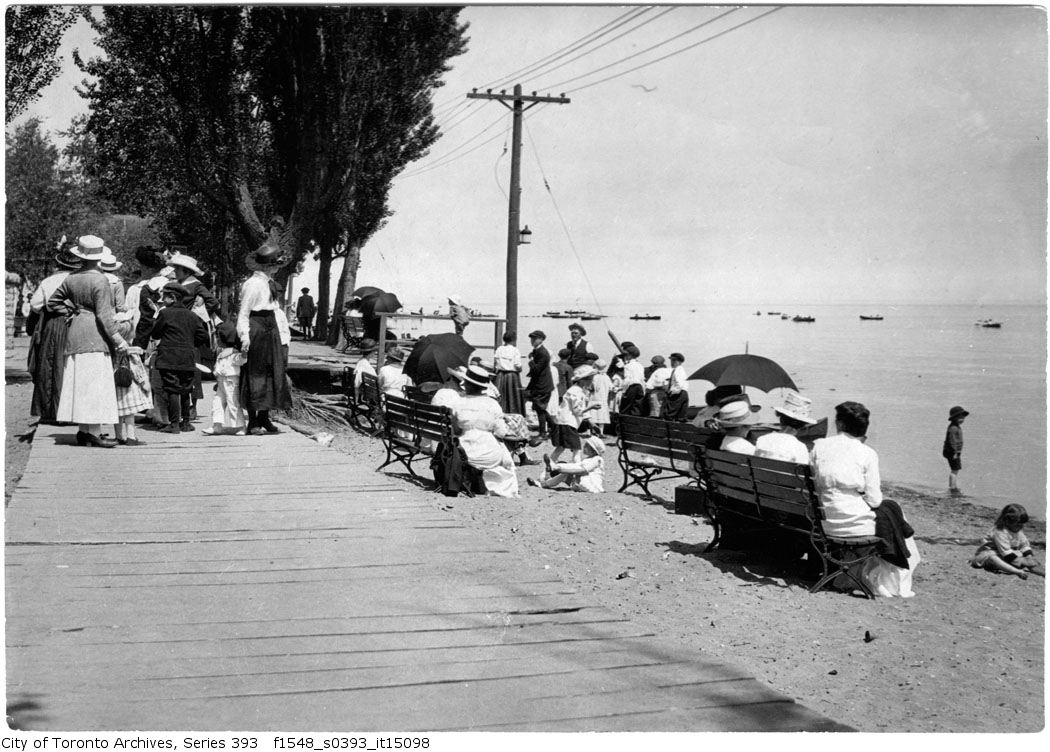
Kew Beach in 1918. Kew Gardens, which sat north to the beach, were appropriated by the Toronto Harbour Commission in the early 20th century.

Originally a heavily wooded area dotted with private homes and swampland, the current shoreline and the Kew Gardens private park grounds were appropriated by the Toronto Harbour Commission in the early 1900s. The current beach was artificially enlarged and made continuous in 1930 with the use of wooden groynes. The public boardwalk and facilities were officially opened to the public in 1932.

The beach is diminishing as the sand is continuously pushed by lake currents from east to west. Historically, the sand was, and to a lesser degree still is, replaced by new sand generated by the erosion of the Scarborough Bluffs to the east. This source of sand has been diminished by municipal efforts to reduce erosion of the bluffs, and groynes constructed of rocks have been used to stabilise the shoreline.

== Attractions and landmarks ==
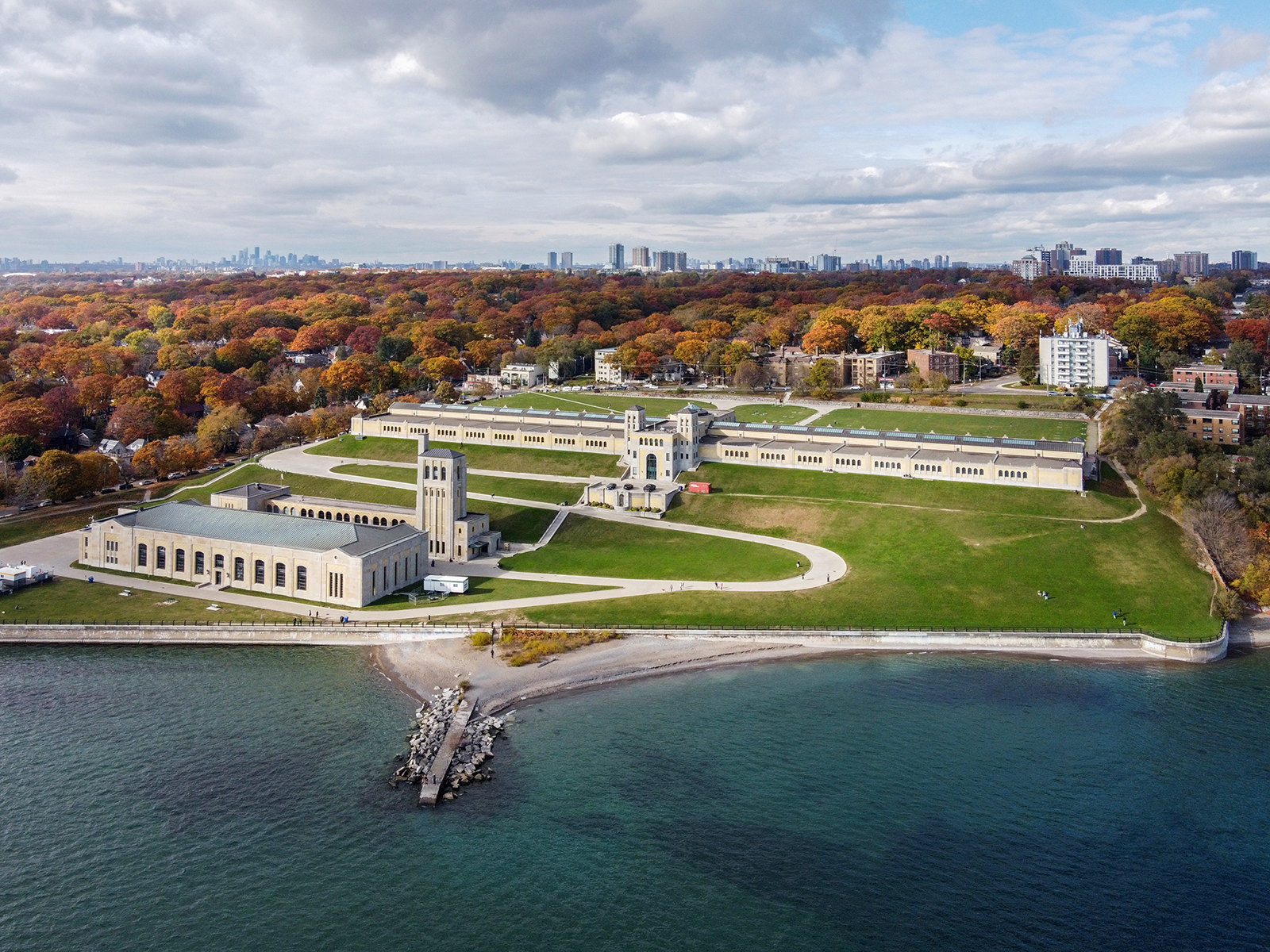
Built in the 1930s, R. C. Harris Water Treatment Plant is a local landmark.

In the early 1900s, the neighbourhood was the site of several amusement parks - Victoria Park (1878-1906), Munro Park (1896-1906), and Scarboro Beach Park (1907-1925). Today, their namesakes remain as streets. Beginning in 1890s there was a ferry service (Victoria Park Ferry) to the area (in addition to streetcar service on Queen Street) from Yonge Street and ended after the closure of the parks.

Kew Gardens is a medium-sized park in the neighbourhood running from Queen Street to Lake Ontario, and includes the Alex Christie Bandstand for concerts. Every July, the neighbourhood celebrates the Beaches International Jazz Festival, drawing thousands to the area. However, now most of the performances occur at Woodbine Beach Park.

Another notable site in the area is the R. C. Harris Water Treatment Plant, which has been featured in several television programs, as well as in the films "Half Baked", "In the Mouth of Madness", "Four Brothers" and "Undercover Brother", and in Michael Ondaatje's novel In the Skin of a Lion.

The Beaches contains a number of heritage buildings that are either designated under the Ontario Heritage Act, or listed in the City of Toronto's inventory of heritage buildings, including:

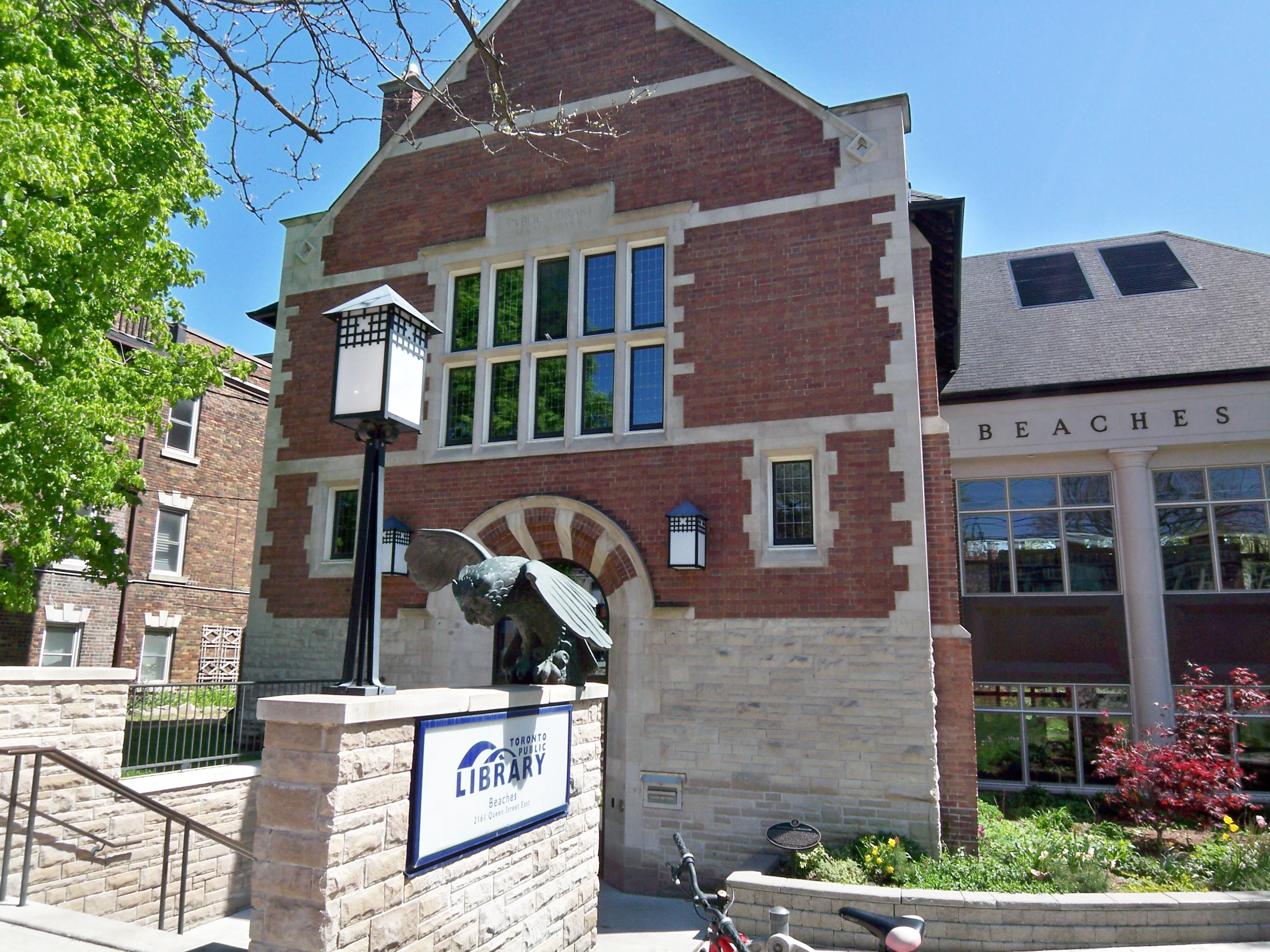
Beaches branch of the Toronto Public Library. Built in 1916, it was one of eight Carnegie libraries in Toronto.

- the Bank of Toronto building, 1958 Queen Street East, now "The Stone Lion" pub, built in 1950;
- Beaches Branch of the Toronto Public Library, one of four original Carnegie Libraries and identical to two others (one in Northern Toronto at Wychwood, one in Western Toronto at High Park), 2161 Queen Street East, originally built in 1916, revamped in 1980 and 2005;
- the Dominion Bank building, at Queen and Lee streets, built in 1911;
- the Dr. William D. Young Memorial, located in Kew Gardens, erected in 1920 and partly designed by Ivor Lewis;
- the Fox Theatre on Queen St. at Beech Ave, built in 1914, which is North America's oldest continuously operated movie theatre;
- Glenn Gould's family home, 32 Southwood Drive;
- The Goof – officially the Garden Gate Restaurant, a well-known Canadian Chinese restaurant in the Beach since 1952, located at 2379 Queen Street East.
- the Kew Beach Firehall No. 17, still in use today as a working firehall (now as Toronto Fire Services Station 227), built in 1905;
- the Kew Williams House, 30 Lee Avenue, aka "the Gardener's Cottage," built in 1901–1902;
- the Leuty Lifeguard Station, foot of Leuty Avenue, built in 1920;
- Inglenook, at 81 Waverley Road;
- Whitelock's Grocery Store, now Whitlock's Restaurant, built between 1906 and 1908; and
- George Davis House on Kingswood Road.

== Education ==
Secular English first language public schools are operated by the Toronto District School Board (TDSB). Publicly funded English first language separate schools are operated by the Toronto Catholic District School Board. In addition to TCDSB/TDSB, applicable residents of the Beaches may also attend schools operated by the Conseil scolaire Viamonde (CSV), and the Conseil scolaire catholique MonAvenir (CSCM). Both school boards are a French first language public school boards, the former being secular, the latter being be a separate school board. However, neither CSCM/CSV operate a school in the Beaches. There are also a number of privately funded and Montessori schools in the neighborhood.

=== Toronto District School Board ===
==== Secondary ====
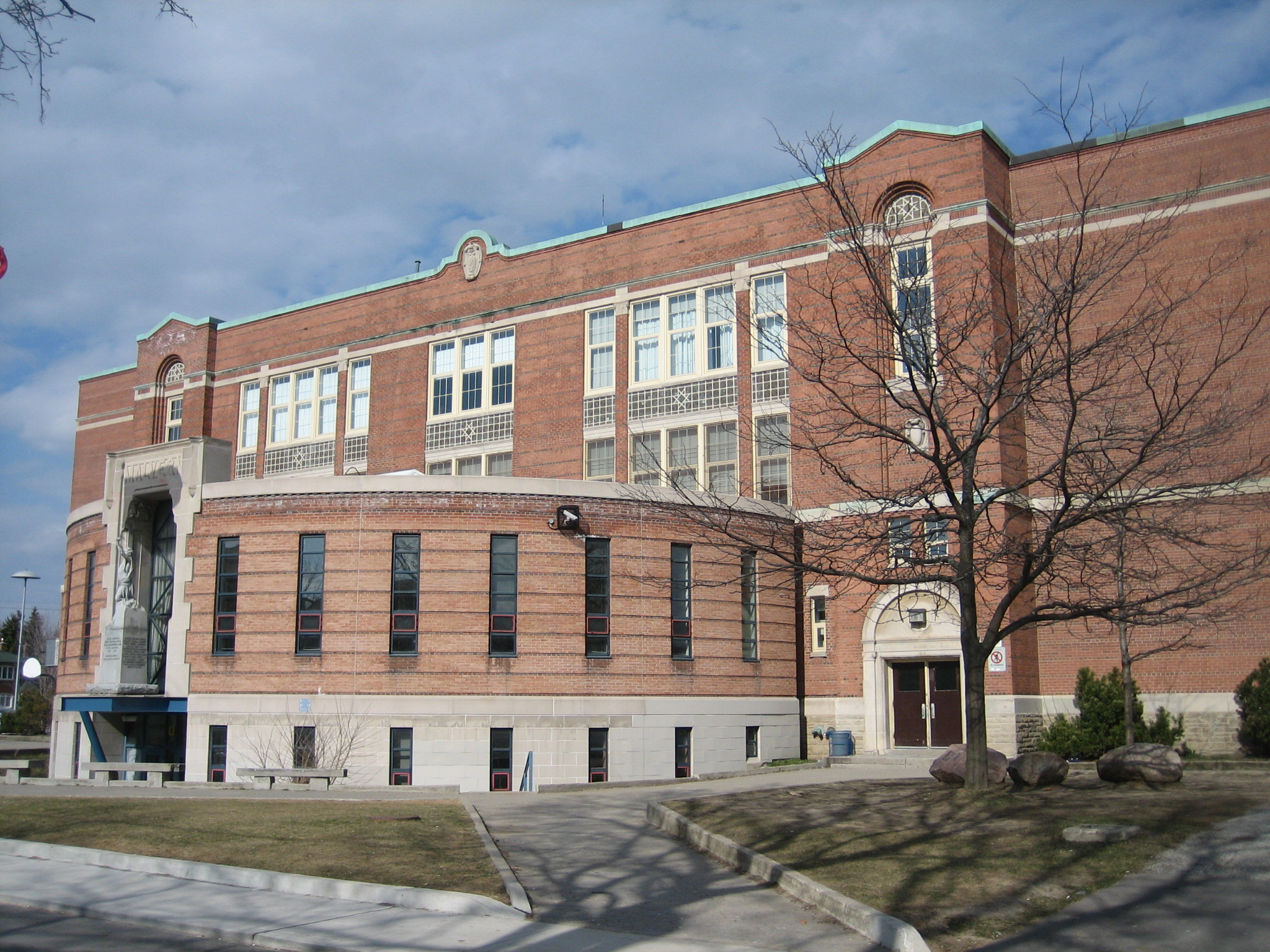
Malvern Collegiate Institute is a public secondary school operated by the Toronto District School Board.

- Malvern Collegiate Institute, located on Malvern Avenue, one block north of Kingston Road.

==== Primary ====
The following schools operated by the Toronto District School Board that offers primary education:

- Glen Ames Senior Public School, a middle school (grades 7 and 8) located on Williamson Road at Hambley Ave, north of Queen St.
- Adam Beck Junior Public School, located on Scarborough Road, one block north of Kingston Road.
- Balmy Beach Community School, located at corner of Pine Avenue and Beech Avenue. The school dates from 1906; the current building was erected in 1975.
- Beaches Alternative School, located entirely within Kimberley Jr. PS (see below) in the "Upper Beaches".
- Kew Beach Junior Public School, located on Queen Street East at Kippendavie, one block east of Woodbine Avenue.
- Kimberley Junior Public School, located at Main Street and Swanwick Avenue in the "Upper Beaches".
- Norway Junior Public School, located on Kingston Road, one block east of Woodbine in the "Upper Beaches".
- Williamson Road Junior Public School, located on Williamson Road at Hambley Ave and Wineva Ave, north of Queen St., attached to Glen Ames Sr PS.

The following schools are technically outside of the Beaches neighbourhood, but due to their close proximity to the area serve many Beaches residents. They include:

- Blantyre PS, located on Blantyre Avenue, near the intersection of Victoria Park Avenue and Gerrard Street East in Scarborough.
- Bowmore Road PS, located on Bowmore Road, south of Gerrard Street East between Woodbine and Coxwell.
- Courcelette PS, located on Fallingbrook Road, south of Kingston Road in Scarborough.

=== Toronto Catholic District School Board ===
==== Secondary ====
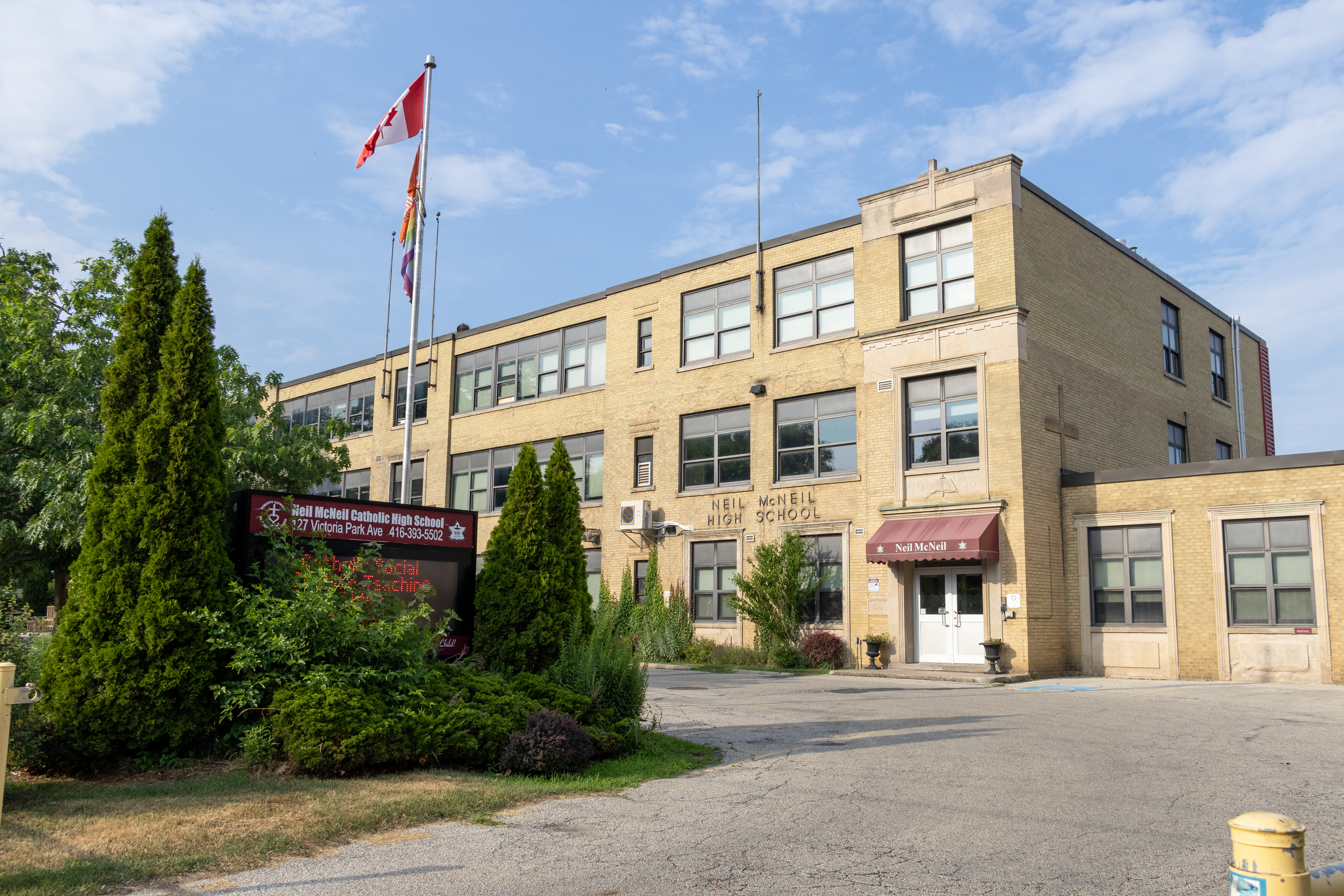
Neil McNeil Catholic Secondary School is a Catholic secondary school operated by the Toronto Catholic District School Board.

The following schools operated by the Toronto Catholic District School Board that offers secondary education include:

- Neil McNeil Catholic Secondary School, located on Victoria Park Avenue, just south of Kingston Road in Scarborough.
- Notre Dame High School (Toronto), located on Malvern Avenue, just north of Kingston Road.

==== Primary ====
The following schools operated by the Toronto District School Board that offers primary education include:

- St. Denis CS, located on Balsam Avenue, just north of Queen Street East.
- St. John's CS, located on Kingston Road, just west of Malvern Avenue.

The following Catholic school is technically outside of the Beaches area, but serves many Beaches residents:

- Georges Etienne Cartier, Catholic French Elementary School, located at 250 Gainsbourough Ave, off Upper Gerrard, East of Coxwell.

== Local media ==
The Beaches community is served by several locally distributed newspapers including the Beach Metro Community News and the East York Mirror (run by the Metroland subsidiary of the Toronto Star) and the "Beaches Living" magazine.

== Politics ==
The area is in the political riding of Beaches—East York, and is represented in the Legislative Assembly of Ontario by Mary-Margaret McMahon, since June 2022. Federally, the riding elected Liberal Tanveer Shahnawaz in 2025.

The area's City Councillor is Nathaniel Erskine-Smith and the area's TDSB school trustee is Karen Emerson. Both were elected in October 2026.

== Public transportation ==
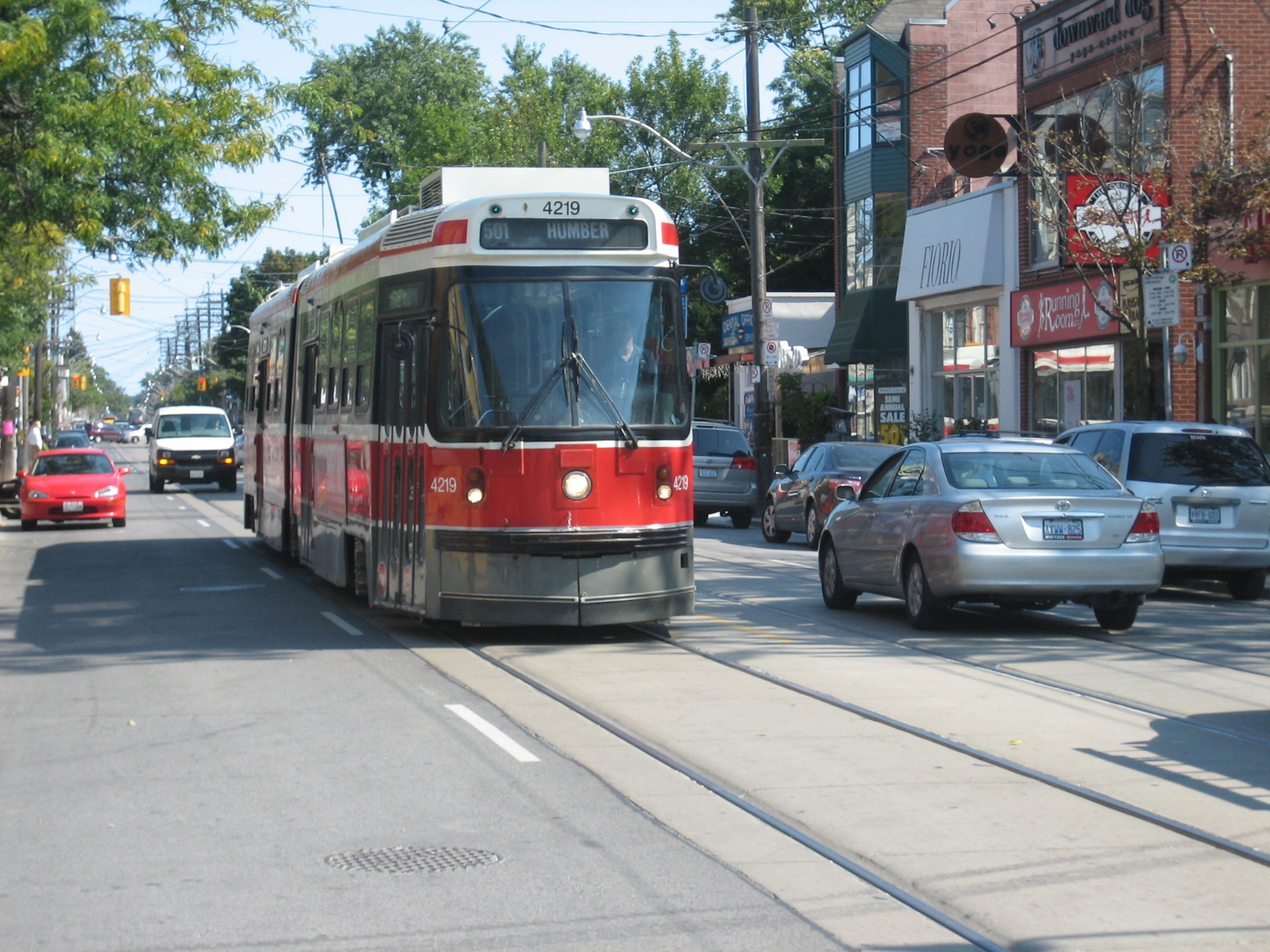
A streetcar of the 501 Queen line at the Beaches. The Toronto Transit Commission operates several streetcar lines in the area.

Streetcars heading to and from downtown Toronto run east-west along Queen Street East (route 501) as well as along Kingston Road (routes 502 and 503) and Gerrard Street East (route 506), and a bus line runs north-south along Woodbine Avenue to Woodbine subway station (route 92). Another north-south bus line snakes its way along several side streets before making its way to the Main Street subway station (route 64). A third bus line runs north-south down Coxwell Avenue from Coxwell subway station and then turns east travelling the entire length of Kingston Road as far as Victoria Park Avenue (only from 7PM-5AM on weekday evenings, and 24hrs on weekends) (route 22A).

== Notable people ==
=== Grew up in the neighbourhood ===
- Academy Award-winning director Norman Jewison
- Sports magnate Jack Kent Cooke
- Olympic sprinter Aaron Brown
- World-renowned concert pianist Glenn Gould
- Musician Saya Gray
- Author Robert Fulford
- Actor/singer Miley Cyrus, while her father was in town for four years filming Doc
- Band Down with Webster
- Disc sports Ken Westerfield, started the first disc ultimate league in Canada on Kew Beach in 1979
- Olympic swimmer Penny Oleksiak
- Actor/director/producer Patrick J. Adams
- Band the Beaches
- Iconic Canadian artist, William Kurelek
- Professional hockey player Jack McBain
- Canadian public address announcer Herbie Kuhn
- Professional soccer player Kobe Franklin

=== Current residents ===
- Author Peter Robinson
- Hockey player Rich Clune
- Actor Jamie Johnston
- Songwriter Dan Hill
- TV Producer Stephen Stohn (Degrassi)
- Flutist and Composer Ron Korb
- Actor Jay Baruchel

== Bibliography ==
- The Beach in Pictures: 1793–1932. Mary Campbell and Barbara Myrvold. 1988. Toronto Public Library Board.
- The Boardwalk Album. Barbaranne Boyer. 2000. Boston Mills Press.
- Historical Walking Tour of Kew Beach. Mary Campbell and Barbara Myrvold. 1995. Toronto Public Library Board.
- Cochrane, Glenn & Jean. The Beach - An Illustrated History from the Lake to Kingston Road. Toronto: ECW Press, 2009.
