= The Goof =

Restaurant in Toronto, Canada

Coordinates: 43.672493°N 79.287273°W

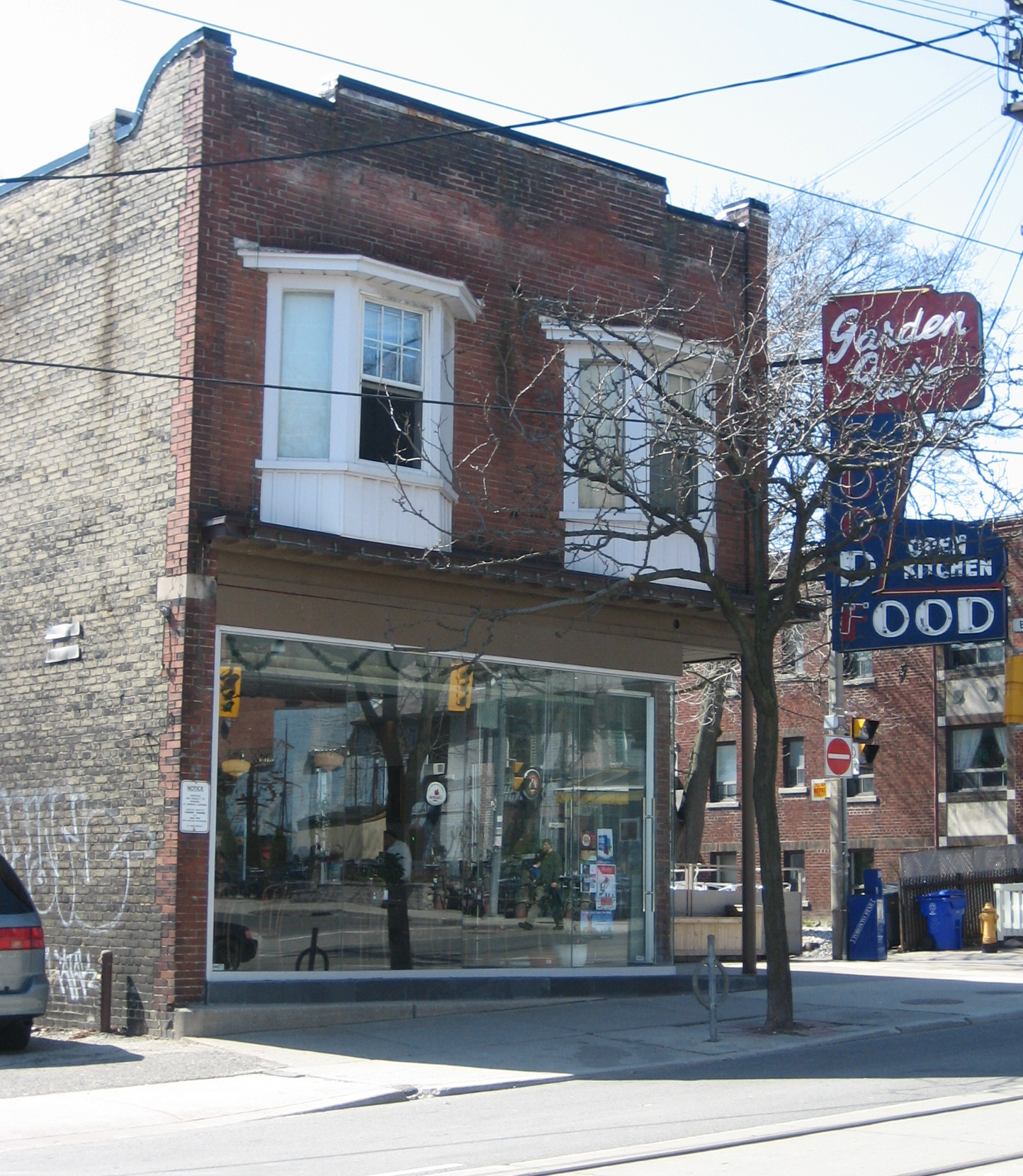
The Goof

The Goof, officially the Garden Gate Restaurant, is a well known eatery in the Beaches neighbourhood of Toronto. Founded in 1952, it serves Canadian Chinese cuisine as well as diner fare such as breakfast and hamburgers. Its nickname comes from the restaurant's neon sign. The word "good" is vertical on the sign and "food" horizontal, so when at some point in its history the "d" in "good" burnt out, it read "Goo F". It is today near universally referred to as The Goof by media and locals, while the official name remains Garden Gate.

After remaining almost unchanged for more than 50 years, the Goof was thoroughly renovated in 2006. The 1950s decor, including the jukeboxes, was removed and a modernist interior, done by local designer Bennett Lo, was put in place. The menu remained unchanged, as did the well known sign outside. Another well known fixture was waiter Hazel Hoeg, who announced her retirement in 2020, having worked at the restaurant since it opened in 1952, a span of 68 years. The restaurant is today owned by Keith Chau, who purchased it in the early 1990s.

In 2017 they updated their webspace to include a unique online ordering application.

The restaurant has also been a filming location for two movies: Frequency with Dennis Quaid and Angel Eyes with Jennifer Lopez.

The song "Pinch Me" by Toronto/Scarborough band Barenaked Ladies makes reference to The Goof with these lines "there's a restaurant down the street/where hungry people like to eat."
