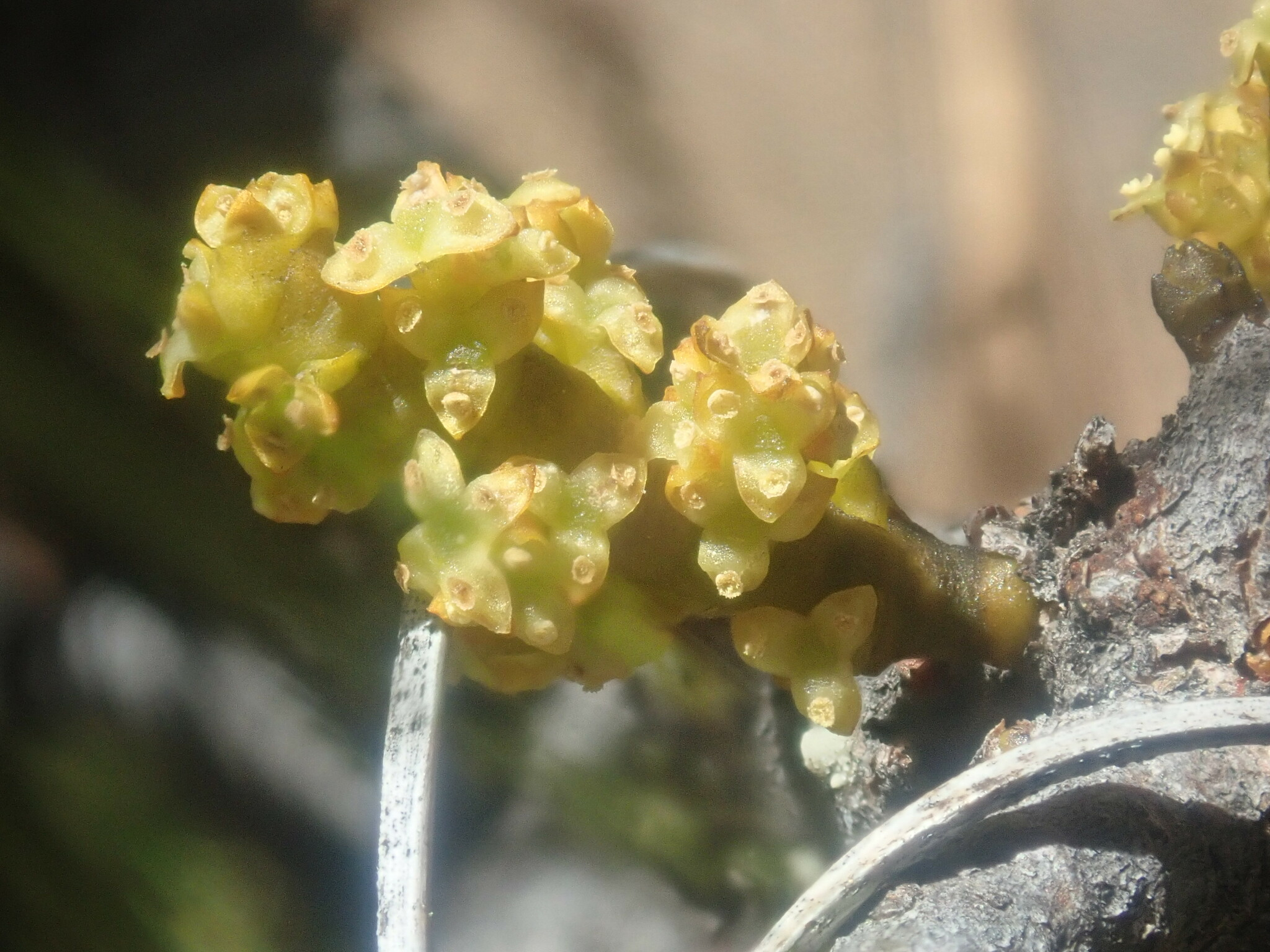

Conservation status
- Apparently Secure (NatureServe)

Scientific classification
- Kingdom: Plantae
- Clade: Embryophytes
- Clade: Tracheophytes
- Clade: Angiosperms
- Clade: Eudicots
- Order: Santalales
- Family: Santalaceae
- Genus: Arceuthobium
- Species: A. gillii

Binomial name
- Arceuthobium gillii Hawksw. & Wiens

= Arceuthobium gillii =

Species of dwarf mistletoe

Arceuthobium gillii, common name "Chihuahua pine dwarf mistletoe," is a parasitic plant found in Arizona, New Mexico, Chihuahua, Sonora and Sinaloa. It is found mostly on the Chihuahua pine, Pinus leiophylla var. chihuahuana.

Flowers and fruit of Arceuthobium gillii

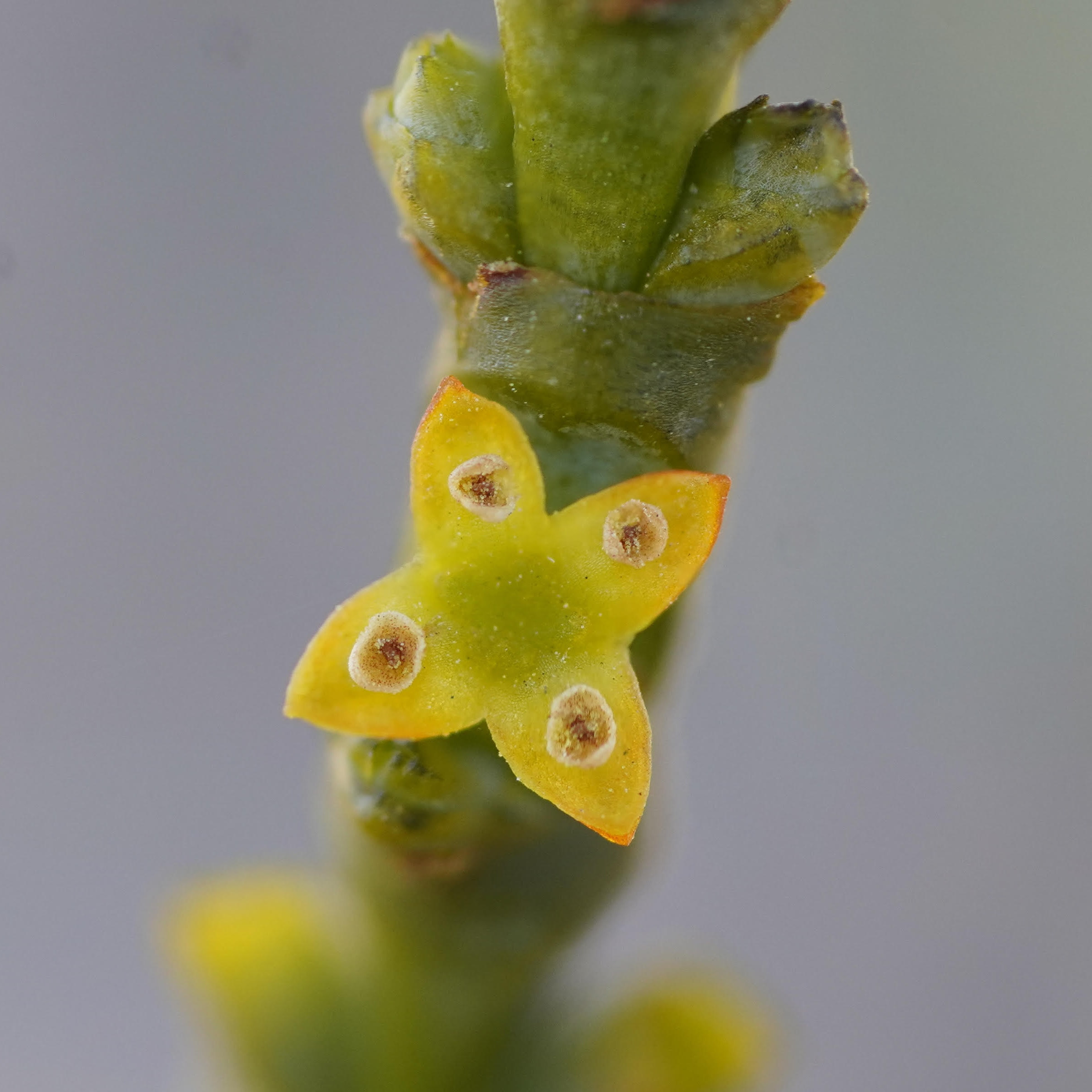
a staminate (male) flower

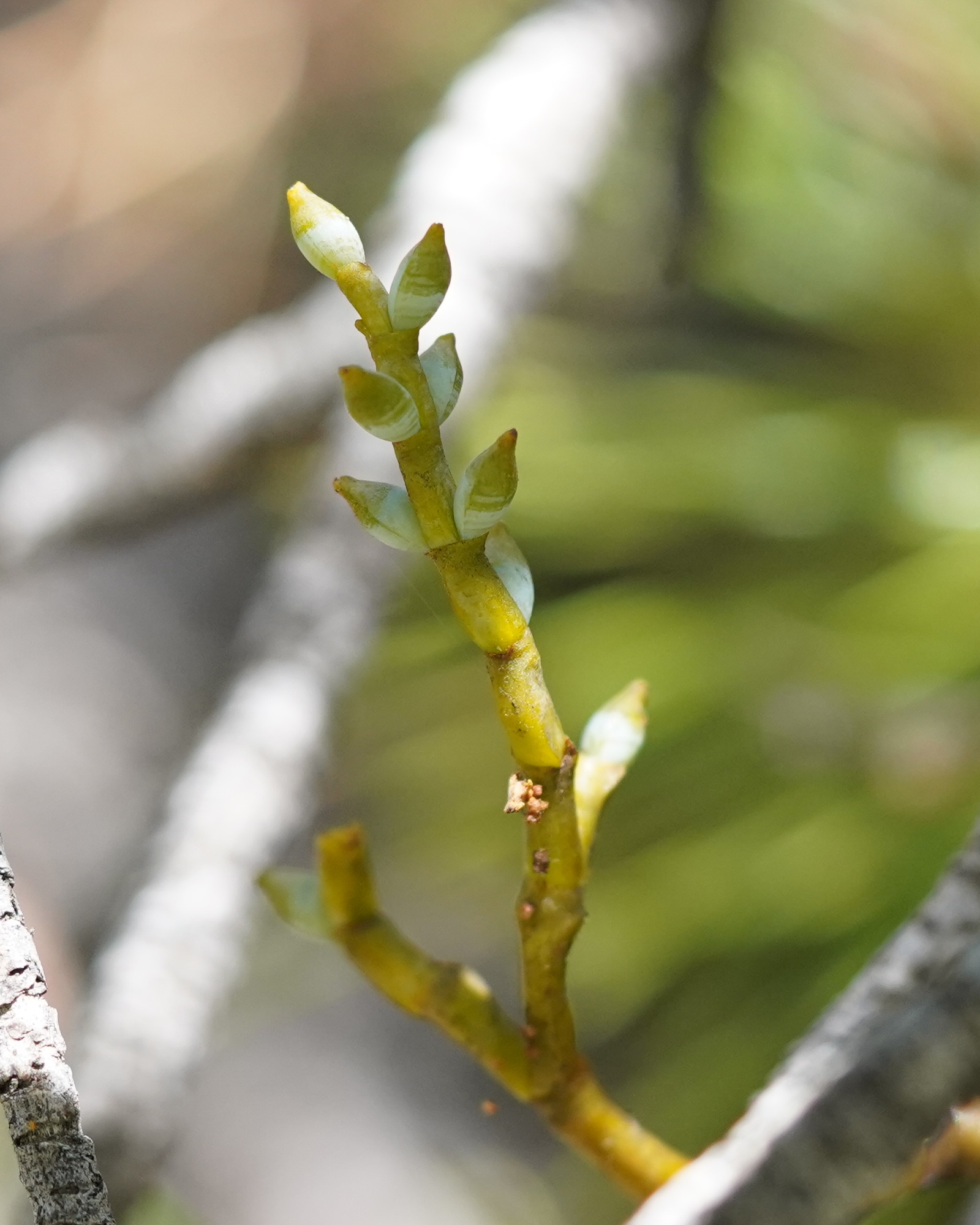
a pistillate (female) plant

== Taxonomy ==
In 1964 Frank Goode Hawksworth and Delbert Wiens described a new species in the Arceuthobium genus, which they named Arceuthobium gillii. Together with its genus it is part of the Santalaceae family and has no botanical synonyms. The species was named in honor of Lake Shore Gill, an authority on the genus.
