= Martin Goodman Trail =

Multi-use path along the waterfront in Toronto, Canada

Coordinates: 43.63339°N 79.40444°W

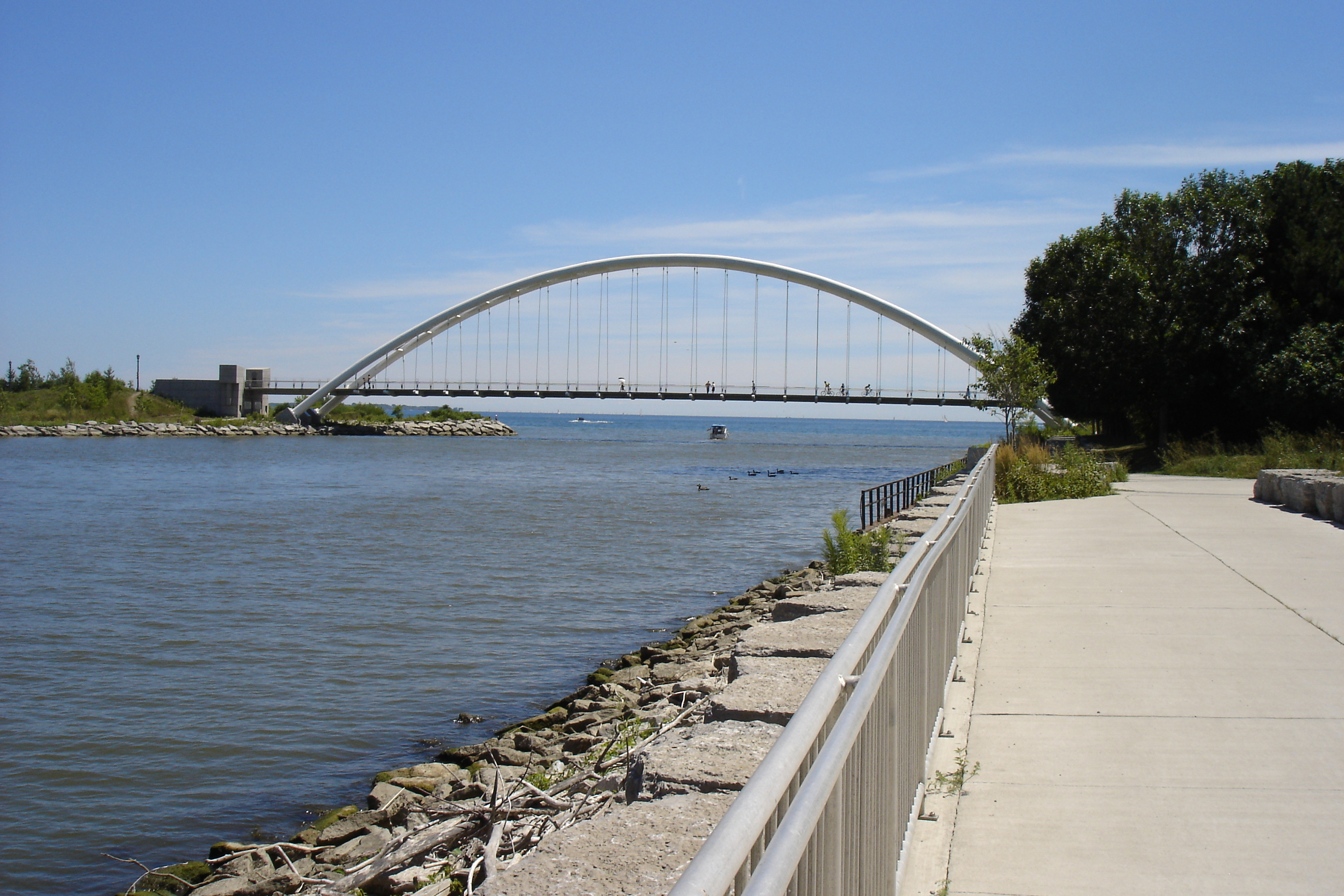
- The Humber Bay Arch Bridge is part of the trail
- Length: 56 km (35 mi)
- Location: Toronto
- Established: 1984
- Use: running, jogging, cycling and inline skating
- Season: Year-round

The Martin Goodman Trail is a 56 km (35 mi) multi-use path along the waterfront in Toronto, Ontario, Canada. It traverses the entire lake shore from one end of the city to the other, from Humber Bay Arch Bridge in the west to the Rouge River in the east. The Martin Goodman Trail is part of the 730 km Waterfront Trail around Lake Ontario.

== History ==
The trail, opened in 1984, was named for Martin Wise Goodman, the president and editor-in-chief of the Toronto Star, who died three years previously. In March 1992, the Toronto Star reported that the then-18 km trail was in the need of repairs, having potholes and a lack of signage where the trail did not yet have dedicated lanes. Repairs started in June 1992 with a $200,000 facelift.

Since 2005, Waterfront Toronto has been responsible for filling in gaps in the trail, particularly along the central waterfront, and maintenance. In 2006, they added an extension to connect to Tommy Thompson Park on the Leslie Street Spit, as first proposed in 1989. Starting in 2008 and finishing in 2009, a new 1.3 km section of the trail opened up along Lake Shore Boulevard at Ontario Place The new section of trail converted 8,000 m^{2} of Ontario Place parking lots into green space and trail.

== Path ==
In Sunnyside, west of the centre of the city, the trail runs where the old boardwalk is, and parallel to the current one. Similarly, in the Beaches, on the east side of the city, the trail also runs parallel to the boardwalk. The trail also passes through Cherry Beach.

== See also ==
- Waterfront Trail

== Gallery ==
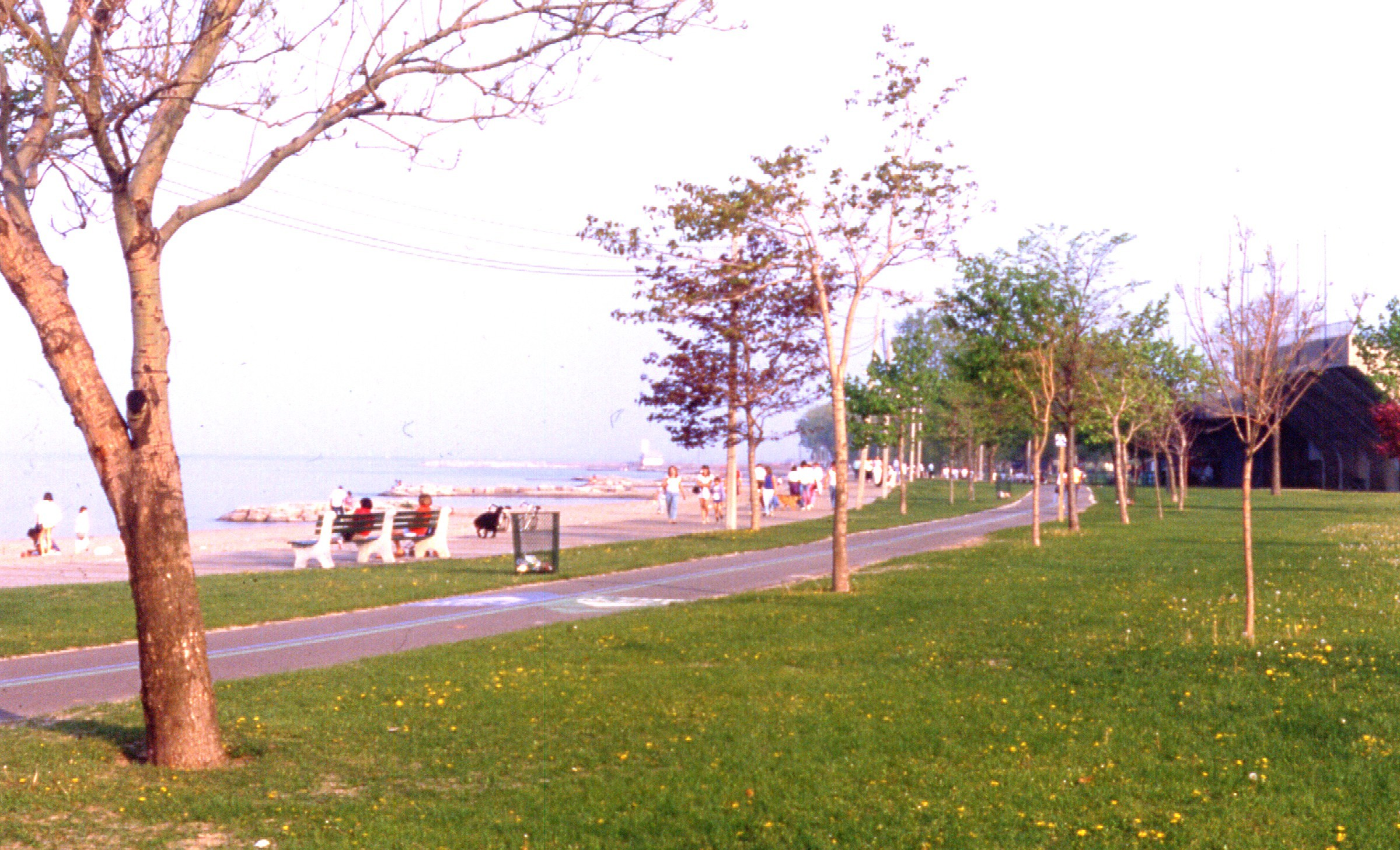
The Beaches in 1984. The boardwalk and the Martin Goodman Trail are seen.

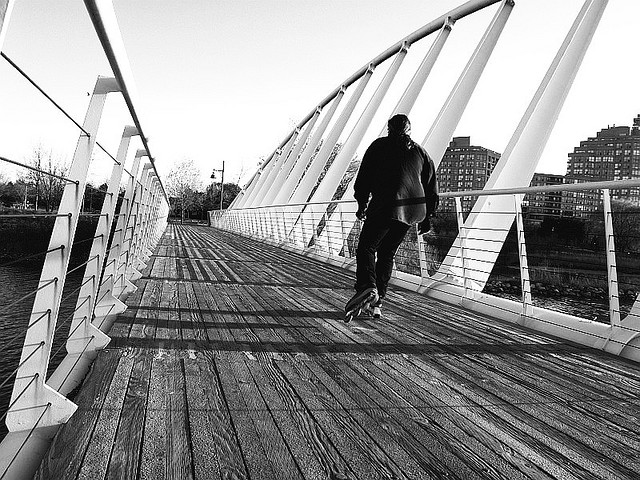
The bridge over Mimico Creek, part of the trail
