= Lake Shore Gill =

American botanist and pathologist

Lake S. Gill
- Born: 1900
- Died: July 5, 1969 (aged 68–69)
- Education: Stanford University; Yale University
- Scientific career
- Fields: Botany
- Author abbrev. (botany): L.S.Gill

Lake Shore Gill (1900 – July 5, 1969) was a botanist and forest pathologist for the U.S. Department of Agriculture. He was a definitive authority on the genus Arceuthobium.

== Career ==
Gill received his bachelor's degree from Stanford University in 1922, and his master's in 1931. He earned his Ph.D. from Yale University in 1934. In the 1930s, he began studying Arceuthobium species in the American Southwest, specifically the effect of forest infestations. In 1935, Gill published the monograph, "Arceuthobium in the United States", which was a seminal treatment of dwarf mistletoe taxonomy and research.

Gill pursued a career with the USDA starting in 1923. He eventually held a senior administrative position in the Albuquerque office. He retired from the USDA in 1960. He died on July 5, 1969.

== Legacy ==
The species Arceuthobium gillii was named in honor of Gill.
