= Lake Shore Drive Bridge =

Lake Shore Drive Bridge may refer to:

- Lake Shore Drive Bridge (Michigan), a pedestrian bridge in Eagle River, Michigan
- Lakeshore Drive Bridge, a bridge in North Little Rock, Arkansas
- Outer Drive Bridge, a bridge that carries Lake Shore Drive in Chicago, Illinois
