= Lake Shore Railway =

Lake Shore Railway or Lake Shore Railroad may refer to:

- Lake Shore Railway (1868–1869), formerly the Cleveland, Painesville and Ashtabula Railroad
- Lake Shore and Michigan Southern Railway, along Lake Erie and across northern Indiana
- Lake Shore Electric Railway, an interurban between Cleveland and Toledo, Ohio
