= Lakeshore, California =

Lakeshore, California may refer to:

- Lakeshore, Fresno County, California
- Lakeshore, Placer County, California, Placer County, California
- Lakeshore, Shasta County, California, Shasta County, California

== See also ==
- Lakehead-Lakeshore, California, Shasta County, California
