= Lake Shore Boulevard =

Street in Toronto

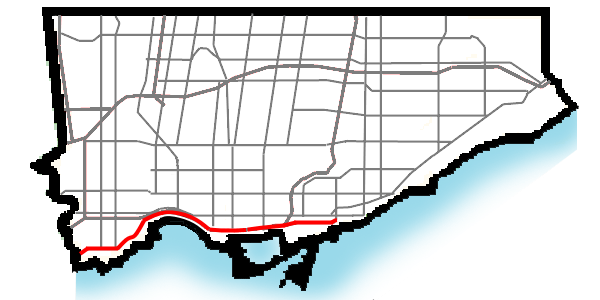
- Lake Shore within Toronto
- Maintained by: City of Toronto
- Location: Toronto
- West end: Toronto-Mississauga boundary (continues as Lakeshore Road)
- Major junctions: Browns Line; Kipling Avenue; Islington Avenue; Royal York Road; Parklawn Road; Gardiner Expressway; Parkside Drive; Bathurst Street; Spadina Avenue; Bay Street; Yonge Street; Jarvis Street; Sherbourne Street; Parliament Street / Queens Quay; Leslie Street
- East end: Woodbine Avenue (continues north as Woodbine)

Other
Nearby arterial roads in Toronto
Gardiner Expressway →

Lake Shore Boulevard (often incorrectly compounded as Lakeshore Boulevard) is a major arterial road running along more than half of the Lake Ontario waterfront in the city of Toronto, Ontario, Canada. Prior to 1998, two segments of Lake Shore Boulevard (from the Etobicoke–Mississauga boundary to the Humber River and from Leslie Street to Woodbine Avenue) were designated as part of Highway 2, with the highway following the Gardiner Expressway between these two sections.

Lake Shore Boulevard's western terminus is Etobicoke Creek, the western boundary of Toronto. Its western section is a redesignation of the old Lakeshore Road, which still runs from Burlington to Mississauga. From here its route follows closely, though not always within sight of, the shoreline of Lake Ontario eastward through the city to Ashbridges Bay, where it curves north and becomes Woodbine Avenue at Woodbine Beach. The former route of Highway 2 briefly follows Woodbine then turns right onto Kingston Road east.

== Route description ==
=== Etobicoke section ===
From the western city limit, Lake Shore Boulevard (designated Lake Shore Boulevard West), originally part of Lakeshore Road, is a four-lane arterial road through the neighbourhoods of Long Branch, New Toronto and Mimico. This section is lined with commercial and retail uses and served by streetcars. The area furthest to the west was more industrial in character, which continues to be converted to other uses. As the street gets nearer to Humber Bay, the Mimico area becomes almost entirely residential and somewhat older as it was one of the first areas of cottage development for city dwellers. East of Park Lawn Road, the street is lined to the south with recently built condominium towers on the former stretch of motels known as "The Motel Strip". No motels now remain from the period when travelers would stay at motels here, which was then just outside the Toronto city limits.

=== Gardiner Expressway interchange section ===
East of Brookers Lane, the route geometry of Lake Shore becomes complicated due to the interchange with the parallel Gardiner Expressway; which runs tight up against it to the north near the Humber River crossing: The westbound lanes cross the Gardiner (running along the north side of it) and are intertwined with the ramp from the westbound expressway which meets the street opposite Brookers Lane after crossing back to the south side; although Lake Shore still has an overlapping two-way section east of this point entirely south of the Gardiner. The streetcar line runs along this segment for a short distance before leaving the street to enter Humber Loop via a short tunnel under the expressway. Lake Shore then briefly downgrades to a two-lane local street and then becomes one lane (and one way) eastbound as it merges with the eastbound offramp from the expressway (which provides the large majority of the traffic along Lake Shore east of this point). on the Humber River bridge.

The splitting of Lake Shore was done at the time of the expressway's construction, as new bridges were built to connect to the terminus of the Queen Elizabeth Way highway. The highway to the west has become part of the Gardiner, and the Lucky Lion monument which designated its starting point was relocated nearby to the south of the Lake Shore Boulevard, just east of the Humber.

=== Sunnyside/Exhibition section ===
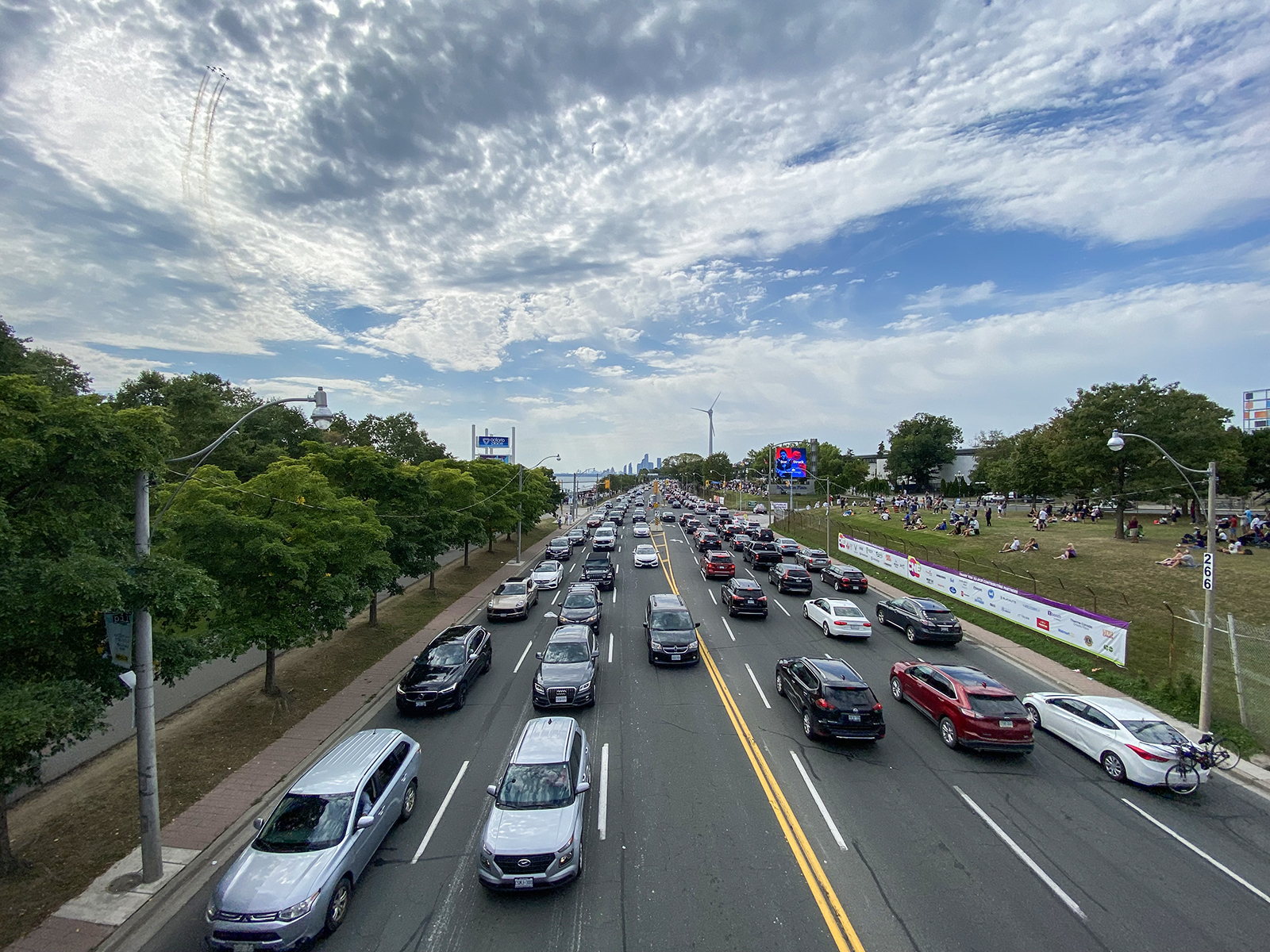
Lake Shore Boulevard immediately south of Exhibition Place, looking west

East of the river, Lake Shore becomes a six-lane parkway-like arterial along Lake Ontario, with vistas of the city and lake. From the to Bathurst Street, the roadway is built on land infilled into the lake. The section east of the Humber was infilled in the 1910-1920s and was part of the Sunnyside Amusement Park development, which the road travelled through. The section south of Exhibition Place was infilled in the 1950s, at the same time as the Gardiner Expressway project. The original shoreline is elevated along the north side of the street. The area east of the Exhibition was infilled earlier. The original shoreline is north of the Boulevard, and the Queen's Wharf lighthouse is on the north side of the street. The Sunnyside/Exhibition section has much open space with some development, including recreation facilities, such as Ontario Place, Sunnyside Bathing Pavilion, Palais Royale and the Boulevard Club.

=== Downtown section ===
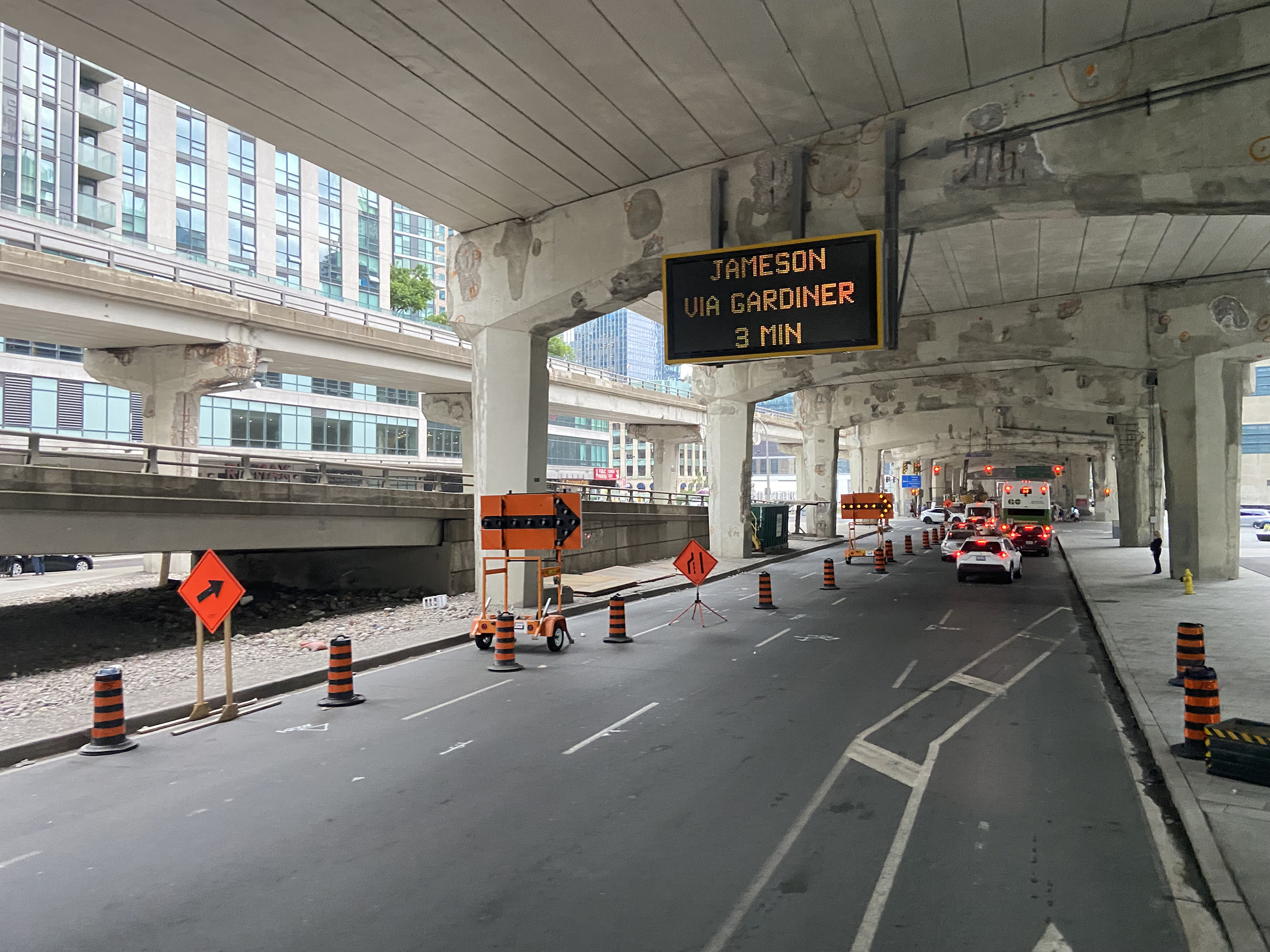
Westbound Lake Shore Boulevard under the Gardiner Expressway

In the downtown section, Lake Shore criss-crosses, runs parallel and underneath the elevated section of the Gardiner Expressway. It is designated Lake Shore Boulevard East east of Yonge Street. This section travels through the old rail lands and port district. The streets in this area predate the designation as Lake Shore Boulevard but were connected in the 1950s prior to being renamed in 1959. From Dan Leckie Way to Yonge Street, the south side of the street has been entirely converted to high-rise condominium development. West of Yonge, Lake Shore is one-way westbound, while eastbound traffic travels along Harbour Street. East of Yonge, Lake Shore is one single road under and alongside the Gardiner.

The 509 Harbourfront and 511 Bathurst streetcars serve the adjacent Fleet Street from Exhibition Place to Bathurst Street, but there are no regular service transit routes along Lake Shore in this area.

=== East of Don River ===
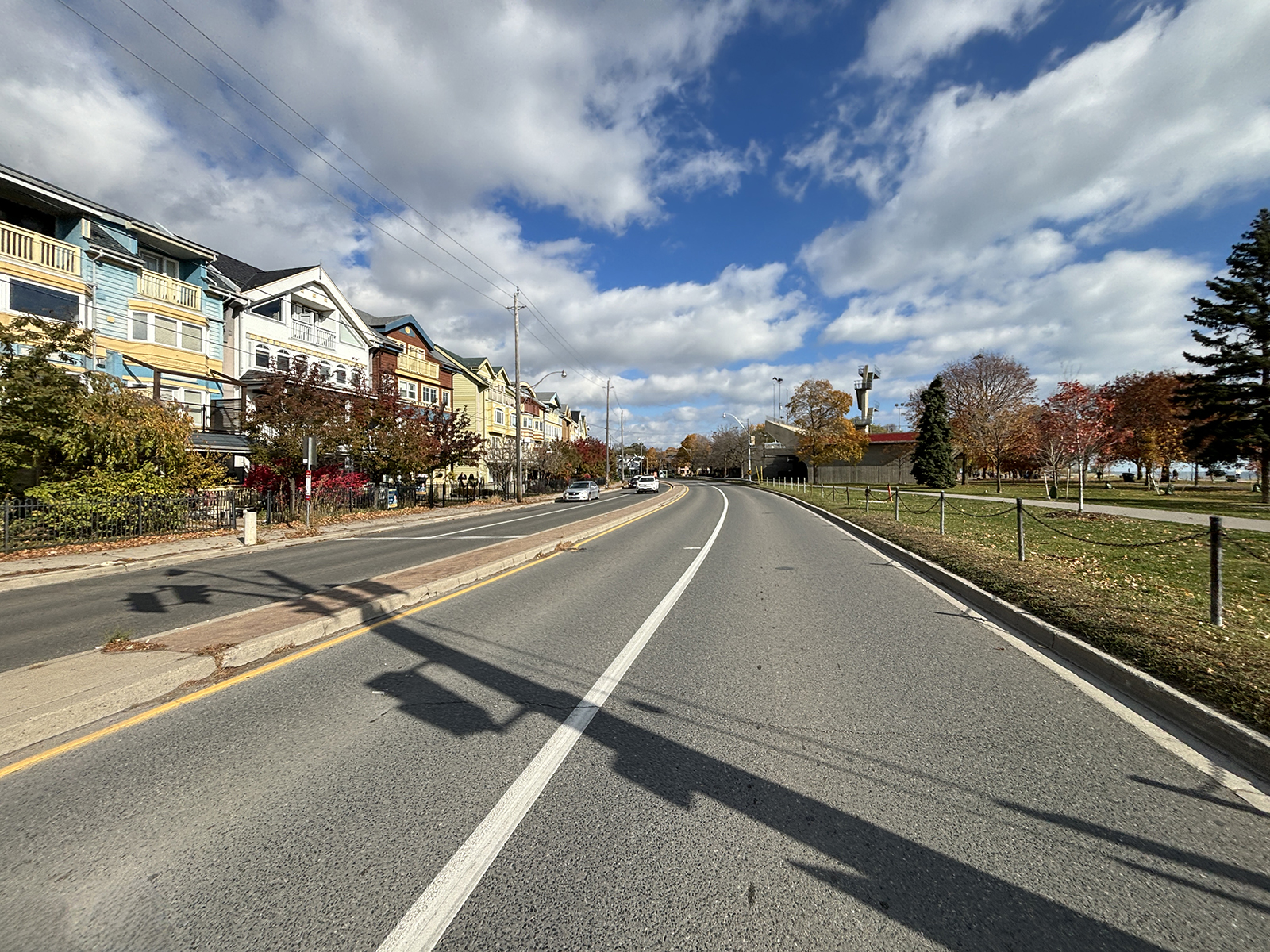
Lake Shore Boulevard East near Woodbine Beach Park, where it curves north to become Woodbine Avenue

.

East of downtown, Lake Shore Boulevard continues as a six-lane arterial road to the Don Roadway, where it curves onto the former Keating Street and continues east to Woodbine Avenue, eventually becoming a four-lane arterial road. The Keating section is straight from Cherry Street to Woodbine. It is an older industrial area that is in transition in the western part. Housing and retail has been built along the road further to the east.

== History ==
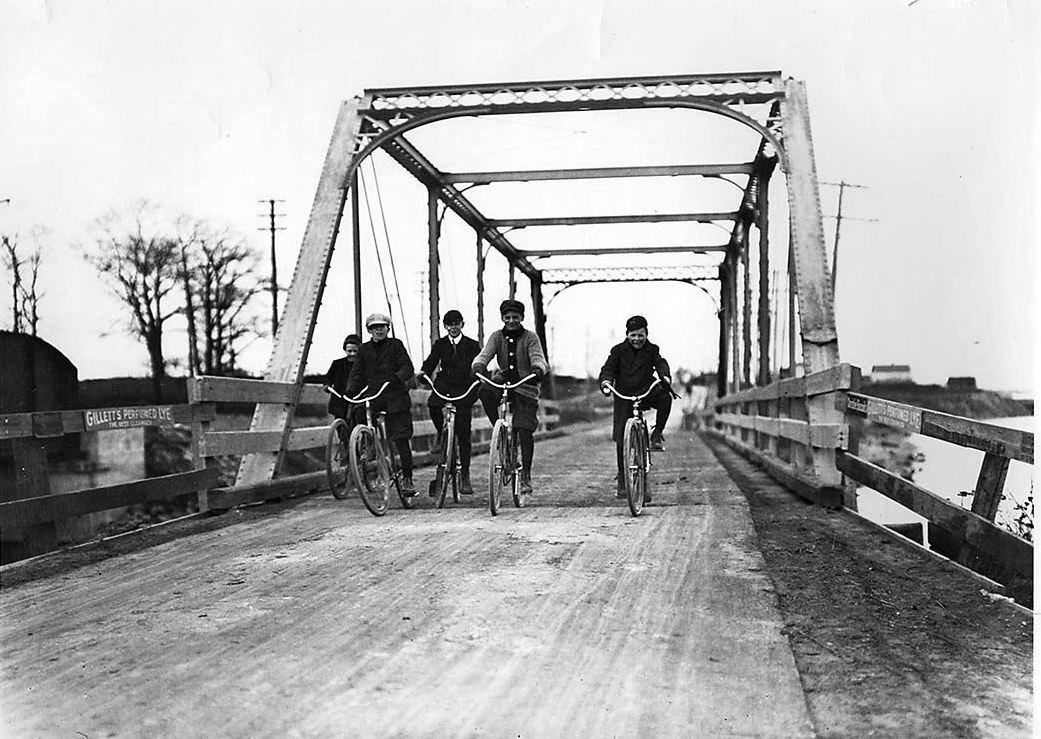
Boys cycling across Lakeshore Road bridge at Mimico (ca. 1907)

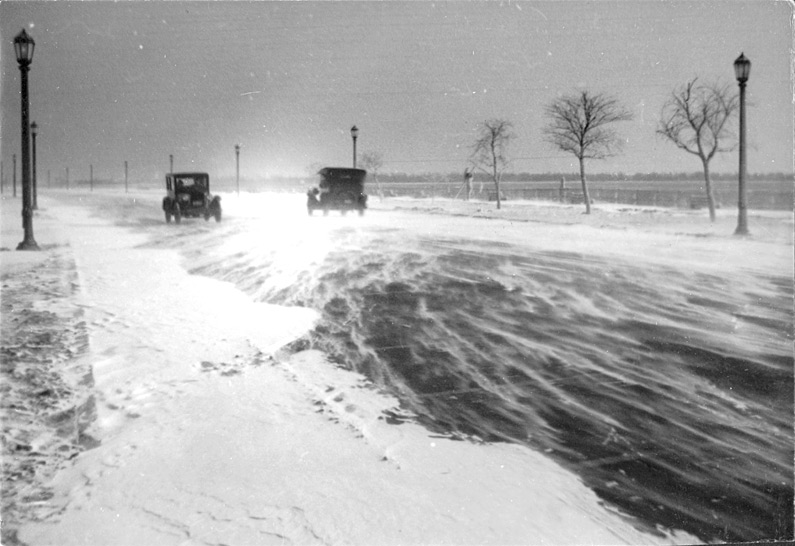
Lake Shore Boulevard during a snowstorm, 1925

Lake Shore Boulevard was constructed in sections; partly through the building of new roads east of the Humber River, partly through connecting existing roads. West of the Humber River, Lake Shore Boulevard was part of the old Provincial Highway. The road east of the Humber was built in sections, the first being a separate road parallel with Lakeshore Road, in conjunction with the development of the Sunnyside Amusement Park waterfront infill. Previously, the Lakeshore Road connected to Queen Street just west of today's St. Joseph's Health Centre. In the 1910s, an overpass over the waterfront rail lines was built to connect Queen Street to the Lakeshore Road at Roncesvalles Avenue. At the same time, Lake Shore Boulevard was extended as a four-lane roadway east to the Exhibition Place area.

In October 1954, the Lake Shore Boulevard bridge over the Humber was destroyed by debris floating downstream in the flooding caused by Hurricane Hazel. A two-lane bailey bridge was quickly put in place and used for several months. A bus shuttled TTC passengers across the bridge as the streetcar line from downtown to Long Branch was severed. The original bridge was repaired and used until new bridges were built as part of the Gardiner Expressway project.

In the 1950s, as part of the Gardiner project, Lake Shore Boulevard east of the Humber was doubled in width by widening into the right of way of Lakeshore Road, replacing it, which resulted in the demolition of the rail overpass leading to the Queen/Roncesvalles intersection by 1960. East of Sunnyside, a six-lane road was constructed to the area of Bathurst and Fleet Streets. Lake Shore Boulevard in the downtown was built to connect Fleet and Harbour Streets and was a service road for the Gardiner. East of downtown, Keating Street was built east to Woodbine as part of the project. When the Gardiner was completed to the Don River, Lake Shore Boulevard was re-routed to Keating and the Keating Street section was renamed Lake Shore Boulevard.

== Spelling ==
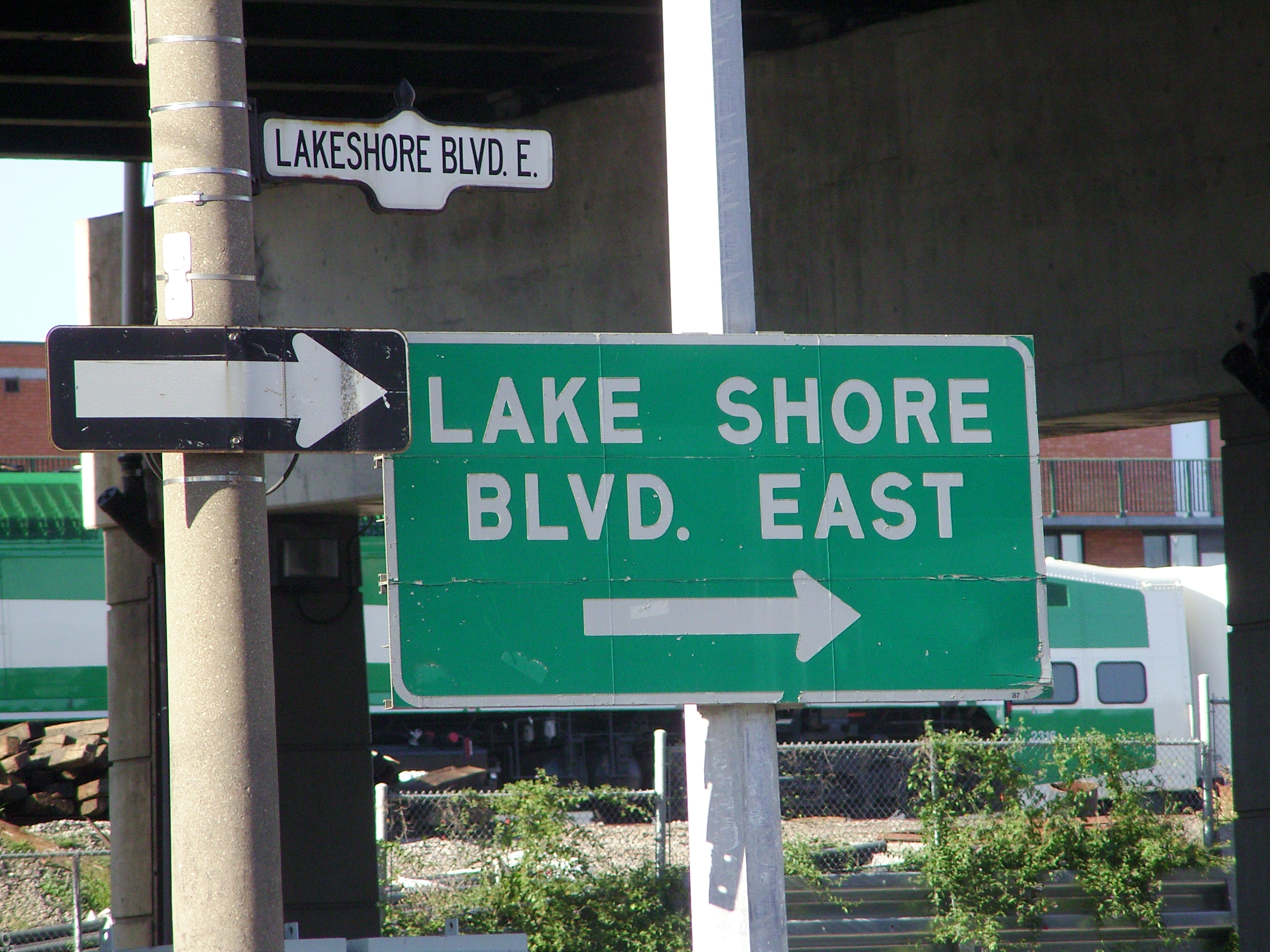
Signs with conflicting spelling along the road

Lake Shore Boulevard is commonly compounded as Lakeshore Boulevard. Many traffic signs, transit shelters and other signs contradict each other, sometimes on the same corner, as illustrated in the photograph. According to the official bylaws that designated the road, the correct format is "Lake Shore Boulevard". This mistake is likely due to confusion with Lakeshore Road to the west, where the single word format is actually correct.

== Public transit ==
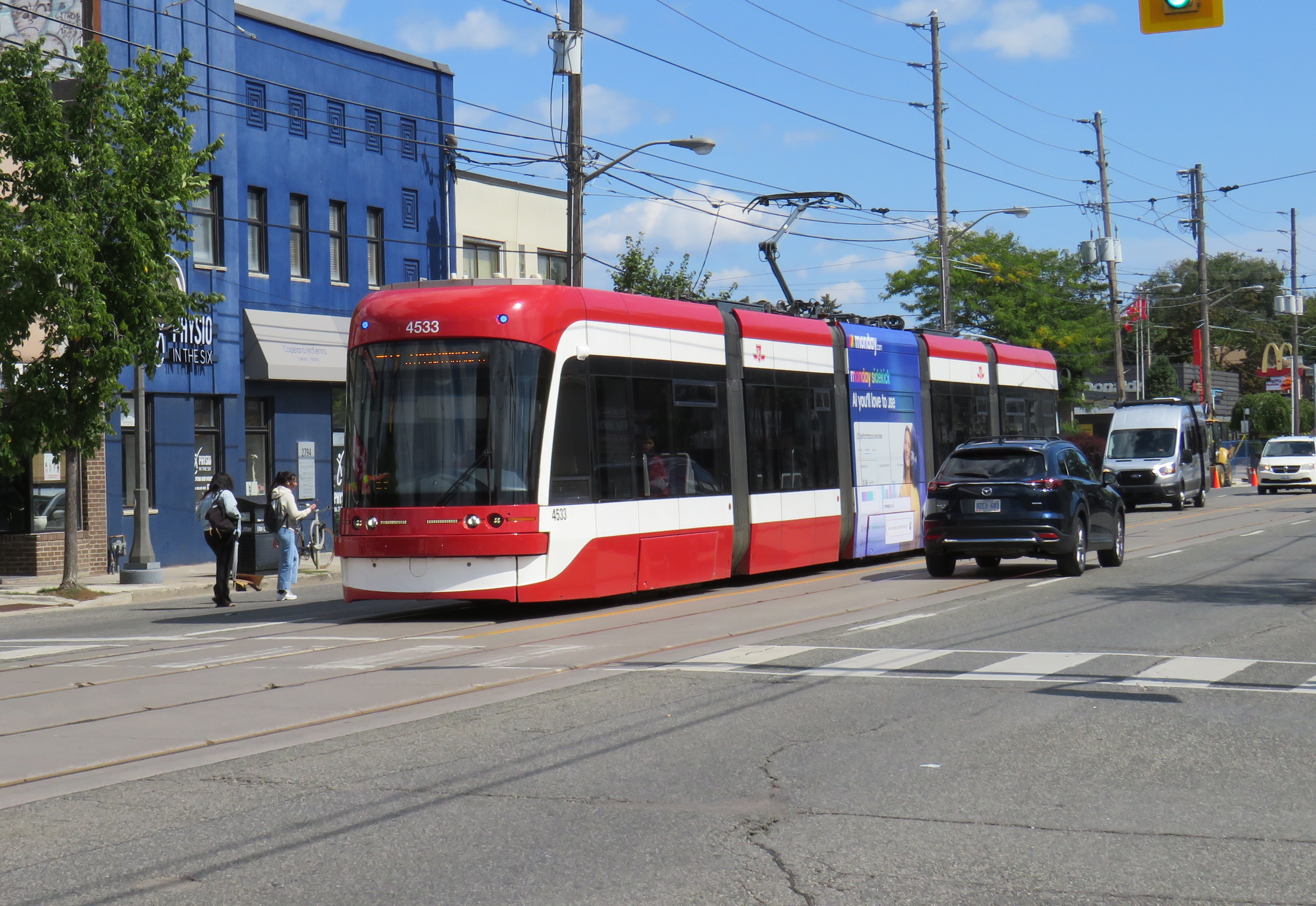
507 Long Branch streetcar on Lake Shore in Etobicoke

In Etobicoke, from just east of the Etobicoke Creek (Long Branch Loop) to the Humber River (Humber Loop), the street is served by the Toronto Transit Commission's 507 Long Branch streetcar route and the rush-hour 508 Lake Shore, the 110B limited service branch of the Islington South bus route runs along the street between Long Branch Loop and 30th Street.

== Landmarks ==
Landmark	Cross street	Notes	Image
Long Branch GO Station	Browns Line		
St. Demetrius Sobor	Kipling Avenue		
Humber College Lakeshore Campus	Kipling Avenue	Formerly Lakeshore Psychiatric Hospital c. 1889	
Colonel Samuel Smith Park	Kipling Avenue		
St. Teresa Roman Catholic Church	Islington Avenue	Roman Catholic Church	
Grand Harbour	Park Lawn Road	Condominium	
Humber Bay Park	Park Lawn Road	City park	
The Palace Pier	Humber River	Condominium	
Humber Bay Arch Bridge	Humber River	Bike and pedestrian bridge	
Queen Elizabeth Way Monument	Humber River	Commemorative monument relocated in 1975 to give way to widening of the then QEW	
Joy Gas Station	Windermere Avenue	Historic gas station structure to be repurposed as an eatery and tourist information centre	
Sunnyside Park	Colborne Lodge Drive	City park and beach	
Sunnyside Bathing Pavilion	Parkside Drive	Historic outdoor swimming pool	
Palais Royale	Roncesvalles Avenue	Social club	
Exhibition Place	New Brunswick Way	Exhibition grounds	
Lake Shore Boulevard Bailey Bridge	New Brunswick Way	Pedestrian bridge over Lake Shore Boulevard	
Ontario Place	Ontario Drive	Former amusement park / entertainment venue	
Queen's Wharf Lighthouse	Bastion Street	Historic lighthouse	
Tip Top Tailors Building	Bathurst Street	Former industrial/office building converted to condominium lofts	
Malibu	Bathurst Street	Condominium	
545 Lake Shore Boulevard West	Bathurst Street	Formerly Crosse and Blackwell Building and studio space	
CityPlace	Spadina Avenue	Condominium development	
Roundhouse Park	Simcoe Street	Historic railway roundhouse located within park	
Old Ontario Provincial Police Headquarters	York Street	Former office complex also used as Workmen's Compensation Board Building and demolished 2011	
Toronto Harbour Commission Building	York Street	Office building	
Scotiabank Arena	Bay Street	Façade of the former Toronto Postal Delivery Building incorporated in hockey arena	
Pinnacle Centre	Yonge Street	Condominium	
Victory Soya Mills Silos	Parliament Street	Abandoned industrial silos	
Keating Channel	Cherry Street	Waterway connecting Don River to Toronto Harbour	
Ashbridges Bay Wastewater Treatment Plant	Leslie Street	Water treatment facility	
Woodbine Beach	Woodbine Avenue	Part of The Beaches	
Greenwood Raceway	Eastern Avenue	Racetrack demolished in the 1990s	

== See also ==
- Queens Quay (Toronto) - actual lakeside road from Bathurst Street east to Parliament Street
- Front Street (Toronto) - former lakeside road until infill of harbour during the late 19th century.
