= Fort York =

Historic British garrison in Toronto, Canada

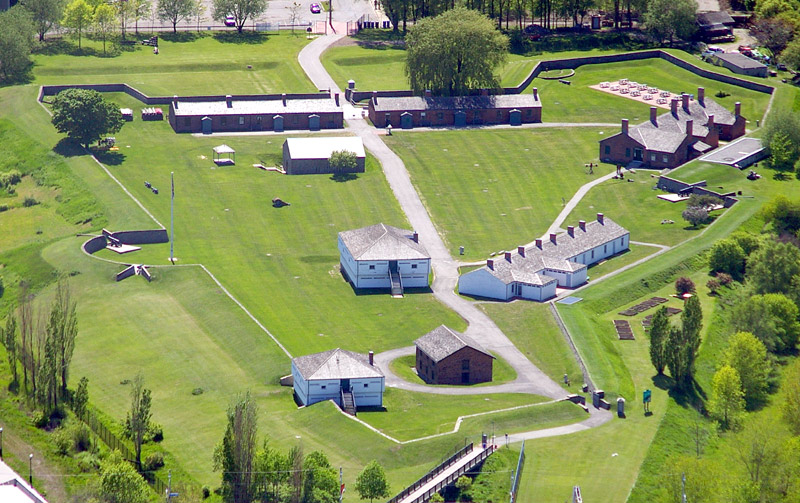
- Aerial view of Fort York from the southeast

- Location within Toronto
- 43°38′20″N 79°24′13″W
- Location: 250 Fort York Boulevard, Toronto, Ontario, Canada

History
- Built: 1793
- Original use: Military fortification
- Rebuilt: 1813–15

Site notes
- Restored: 1932–34; 1949
- Restored by: Municipal government of Toronto
- Current use: Museum
- Owner: Municipal government of Toronto
- Website: www.fortyork.ca

National Historic Site of Canada
- Official name: Fort York National Historic Site of Canada
- Designated: 25 May 1923

Ontario Heritage Act
- Official name: Fort York Heritage Conservation District
- Type: Heritage Conservation District
- Designated: 21 May 1985

Fort York is an early 19th-century military fortification in the Fort York neighbourhood of Toronto, Ontario, Canada. The fort housed members of the British and Canadian militaries and defended the entrance to Toronto Harbour. The fort features stone-lined earthwork walls and eight historical buildings within them, including two blockhouses. The fort forms a part of Fort York National Historic Site, a 16.6 ha (41-acre) site that includes the fort, Garrison Common, military cemeteries, and a visitor centre.

The fort originated from a garrison established by John Graves Simcoe in 1793. Anglo-American tensions resulted in the fort being further fortified and designated as an official British Army post in 1798. The original fort was destroyed by American forces following the Battle of York in April 1813. Work to rebuild the fort began later in 1813 over the remains of the old fort and was completed in 1815. The rebuilt fort served as a military hospital for the remainder of the War of 1812, although it briefly saw action against an American naval vessel in August 1814.

Fort York remained in use with the British Army and the Canadian militia, despite the opening of New Fort York to the west in the 1840s. In 1870, the property was formally transferred to the Canadian militia. The municipal government assumed ownership of the fort in 1909, although the Canadian military continued to make sporadic use of the fort until the end of the Second World War.

The fort and the surrounding area were designated as a National Historic Site of Canada in 1923. The fort was restored to its early-19th-century configuration in 1934 and reopened as a museum on the War of 1812 and military life in 19th-century Canada.

== Name ==
The name Fort York is a retronym, with the fortifications initially called the Garrison, the Garrison at York, or the Fort at York, the latter two taking their name from the settlement the fort protected. After new fortifications were built in 1841, residents of Toronto referred to the older fortifications as the Old Fort, in order to distinguish it from the new fort. Usage of the term Fort York to refer to the old fort emerged during the 1870s. The site was referred to as Old Fort York from the time it was converted into historic museum in the early 20th century to 1970 when the Toronto Historical Society re-branded the site as Historic Fort York.

== History ==
The British first examined Toronto as a potential settlement and military site during the 1780s, although a permanent military presence was not established in Toronto until 1793; during a period when Anglo-American relations had deteriorated. In the early 1790s, John Graves Simcoe, the lieutenant governor of Upper Canada, began to consider building a fort in Toronto; as a part of a larger effort to reposition isolated British garrisons in the U.S. Northwest Territory and near the Canada–United States border to more centralized positions, and to vacate British forces from U.S. territory in an attempt to reduce tensions with the Americans. (Note: Until the Jay Treaty went into effect in 1796, British forces occupied several fortifications in the American Northwest Territory.) Simcoe's decision to base a fort in Toronto was also influenced by his assessment that American forces could overrun its positions in the frontier, including its naval base in Kingston.

Simcoe selected Toronto (renamed York from 1793 to 1834) as the location of a new British Army military garrison, due to its proximity away from the border, and because its natural harbour only had one access point from water, making it easy to defend. (Note: The "western gap" was the only access point into Toronto's Inner Harbour prior to the 1850s. The harbour's second access point, the "eastern gap", was not formed until the 1850s; after the peninsula was severed from the mainland to form the Toronto Islands.) Once established, Simcoe envisioned the harbour as a base where British control over Lake Ontario could be exerted, and where they could repel a potential American attack from the west into eastern Upper Canada.

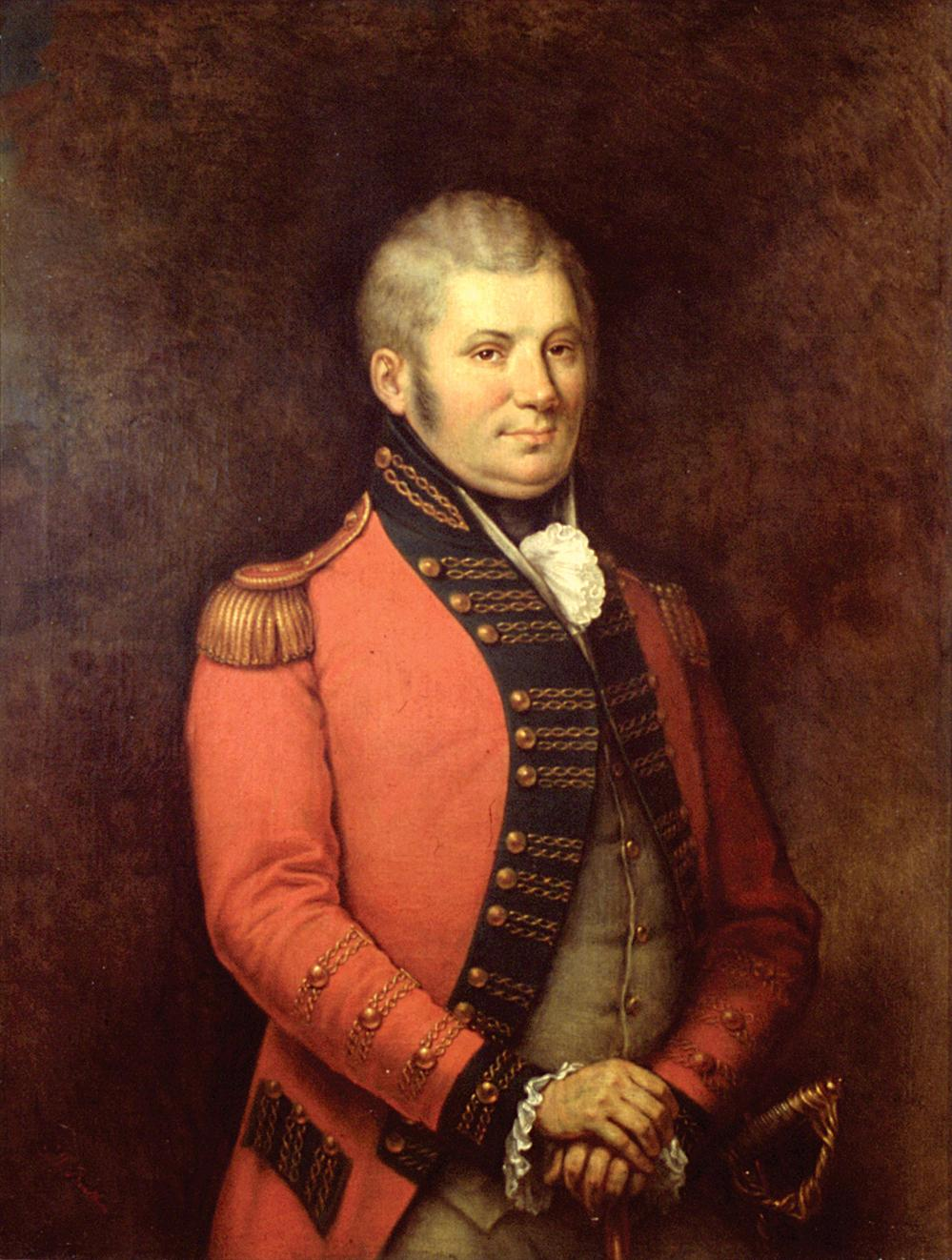
John Graves Simcoe, the lieutenant governor of Upper Canada. He first considered establishing a garrison in Toronto during the 1790s.

He also envisioned the fort serving as the centre of a transportation network where British forces could be dispatched throughout the colony. Simcoe planned for the fort to be connected to a network of subsidiary fortifications along a series of east-west roads acting as an alternate transportation route to the Great Lakes, and the north-south portage route that leads to the Georgian Bay. The latter route was vital for maintaining communication with British outposts in lakes Huron, Michigan, and Superior, in the event the routes through Lake Erie and the Detroit River become cut off by Americans forces. However, many of the planned subsidiary forts were never built, with Simcoe unable to procure the funds needed to build them.

=== Original fort (1793–1813) ===
The first permanent British garrison was established in Toronto on 20 July 1793, when 100 soldiers from the Queen's Rangers landed around Garrison Creek; and erected 30 cabins built from green wood on the site of the fort for wintering quarters; configured in a triangular shape similar to the present fort's shape. Simcoe planned for Fort York to be a part of a defence complex built around the settlement's harbour, with the fort situated north of another fortification planned at Gibraltar Point. However, his proposal to further fortify the settlement was rejected by the governor general of the Canadas, Lord Dorchester, who took the position that the money should instead be spent on improving the defences at the naval base in Kingston.

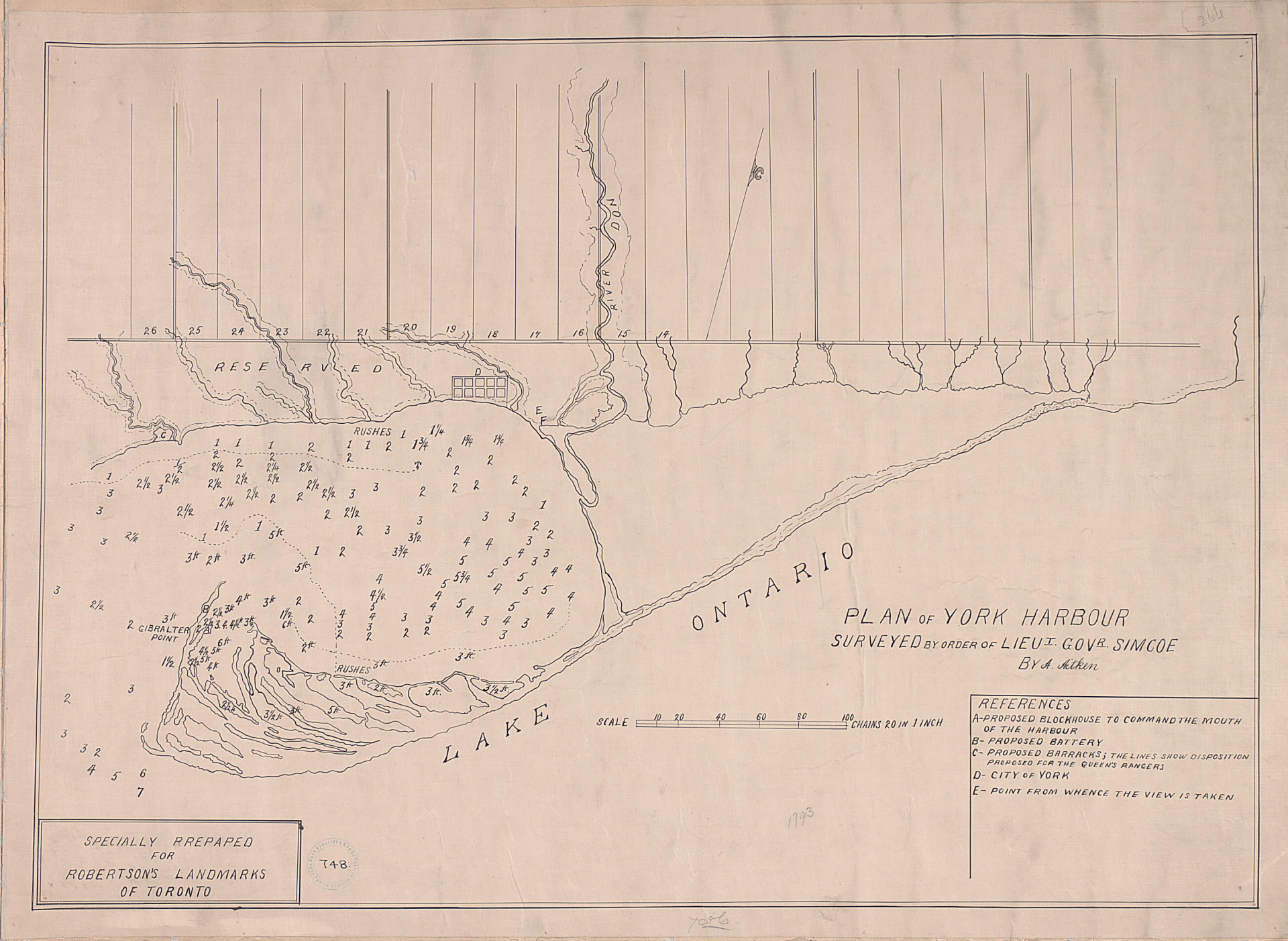
Plan for York, Upper Canada in 1793, with Fort York, labelled along the northwest shoreline as C., guarding the entrance to York Harbour.

Simcoe pressed forward with the construction of Fort York despite the governor general's objections; although he had to rely on funds from the provincial treasury as opposed to military funds, given that the fort was not an official army post. By November 1793, Fort York consisted of two log barracks, a stockade, and a sawmill to provide lumber. Over the next year, the Queen's Rangers erected a guard house, and two blockhouses near Gibraltar Point, albeit at a smaller scale than what was envisioned by Simcoe. The fort defended the harbour's access point, as well as the most likely landward approach the Americans would take towards the settlement; with British planners believing American forces would land west of the harbour, and advance towards the settlement with the support of its naval vessels. Simcoe continued to develop York's fortifications until the end of 1794 when he concluded that York could not be defended in its current state. In 1794, Simcoe took several artillery pieces from these fortifications after he was ordered to erect Fort Miamis in the Northwest Territory, leaving York with only a few condemned guns that were taken from Kingston.

By the time most of the colony's administration was relocated to York in 1796, the fort was manned by a 147-man garrison. As York's naval shipyards were based at Humber Bay, and no naval base existed in its harbour, the defensive capabilities of Fort York remained limited. However, two other blockhouses were erected around the settlement, including one at Fort York. The blockhouse at Fort York also featured a cupola, used to guide ships into the harbour.

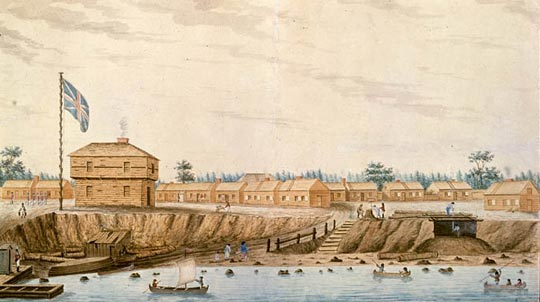
Fort York in 1804. Most of the fort's original structures were renovated or rebuilt at the end of the 18th century.

In late 1798, Fort York formally became an official British Army post, granting it access to funds reserved for military use. After the fort was made an official military post, a stockade was built around the fort. Many of its original structures were also replaced with new buildings, including barracks, carriage and engine shed, the colonial government house, guardhouse, gunpowder magazine, and storehouses. As Anglo-American tensions rose again at the beginning of the 19th century, Major-General Isaac Brock ordered the construction of three artillery batteries, and a wall and dry moat on the western boundary of the fort. The batteries were equipped with furnaces, allowing the batteries to fire heated shot, with further 12-pounder guns placed on mobile carriages used to respond to threats outside the fixed ranges of the batteries.

Simcoe's original proposal of using York as a naval base was also reconsidered during the early 19th century, with plans to expand the fort near Government House to accommodate a naval base. However, as the majority of the naval assets in Upper Canada were based in Kingston, the governor general of the Canadas, George Prevost, planned to make the move to York in phases.

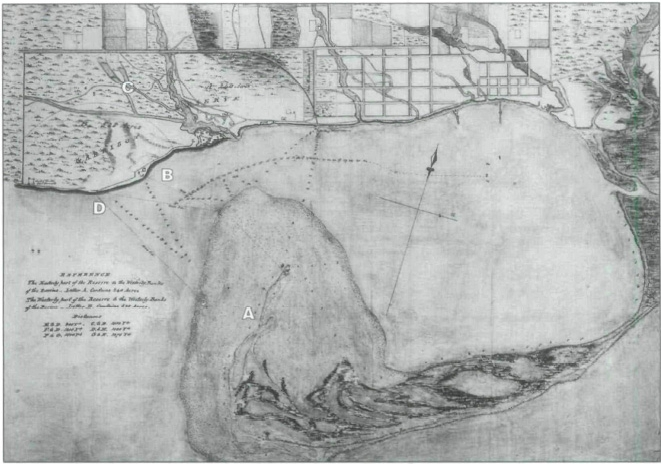
Map of York prior to the Battle of York in 1813. The fort is visible north of the harbour's entrance.

When news of the American declaration of war arrived at York, the regulars and military cavalry squad of the fort left for the Niagara peninsula, eventually participating in the Battle of Queenston Heights. While its garrison was deployed in the Niagara, Fort York was manned by the Canadian militia. However, it was apparent to the colonial administration that the settlement could not repel an attack without further improvements to its fortifications; something not possible due to wartime shortages.

==== Battle of York ====
The town of York was eventually attacked by American forces in April 1813. The attack formed the first part of Henry Dearborn's plan to take the Canadas by first attacking York, then the Niagara peninsula, Kingston, and finally Montreal. Fort York formed a part of the settlement's defences, which included batteries and blockhouses around the town and Gibraltar Point. After reports of approaching American ships reached the settlement, most professional troops in the area, First Nations-allied warriors, and some members of the local militia assembled at the fort. The regulars and militias stationed at the town's blockhouse were later ordered to reassemble at Fort York once it was made apparent that no landings would occur east of the settlement.

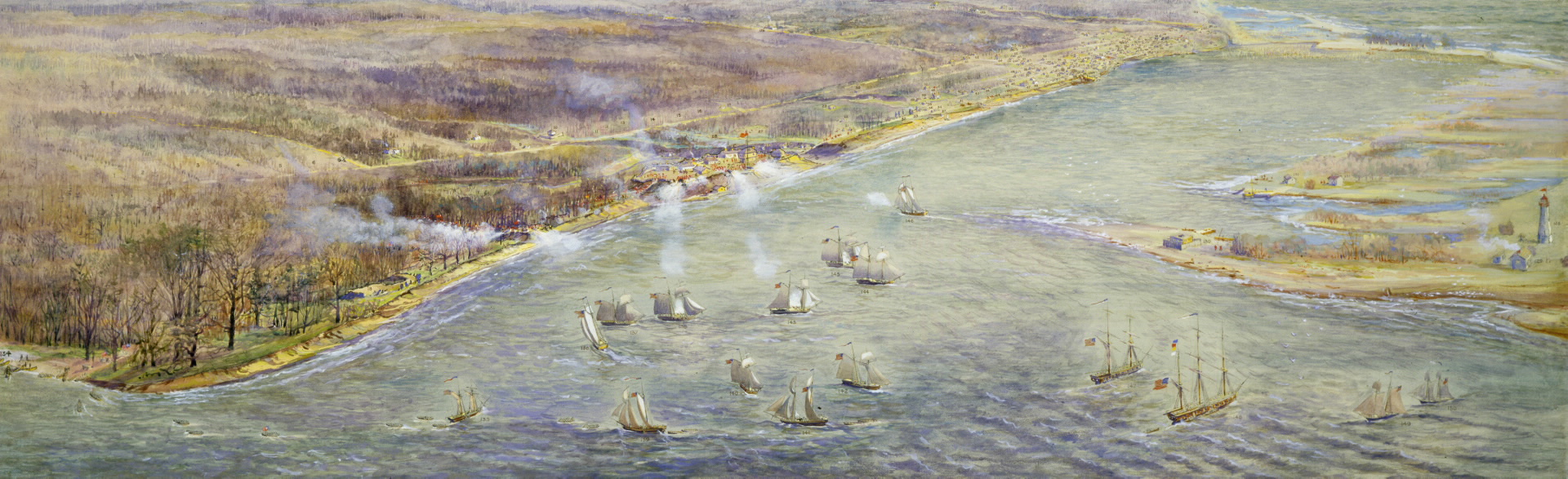
The American naval squadron exchanges fire with the fort during the Battle of York

Most of the fighting occurred during the American landing, approximately 2 km (1.2 mi) west of the fort. Unable to prevent the landings, and repel the force at the western battery, the British-First Nations force eventually retreated back to the fort. American forces advanced east towards the fort and assembled themselves outside its walls, exchanging artillery fire with the fort. The naval squadron also bombarded the fort, having re-positioned themselves directly south of the fort's stockade. Recognizing that the battle was lost, the British commanding officer, Roger Hale Sheaffe, ordered for a silent withdrawal from the fort, and to rig the fort's gunpowder magazine to explode to prevent its capture. The two sides continued to exchange artillery fire until Sheaffe's withdrawal from the fort was complete. Because the British flag was left on the flagpole of the fort, the Americans assembling outside its walls assumed the fort remained occupied.

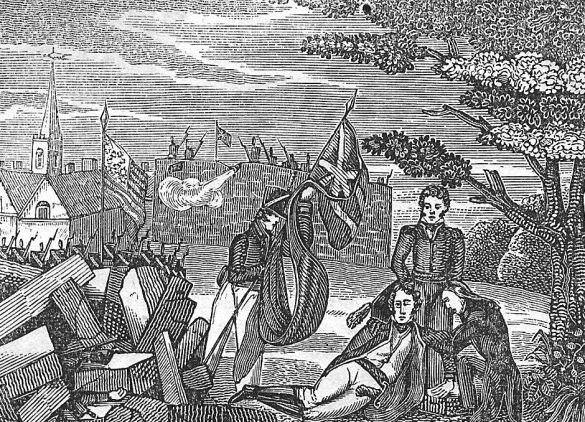
Death of US Brigadier General Zebulon Pike after the gunpower magazine at Fort York exploded.

As the gunpowder magazine contained 74 tons of iron shells and 300 barrels of gunpowder, a significant amount of debris was launched into the air once the gunpowder magazine was ignited and dropped onto the American forces still outside the fort. The following explosion resulted in over 250 American casualties, including Brigadier General Zebulon Pike. Fearing a counterattack after the explosion, American forces regrouped outside the wall and did not advance onto the abandoned fort until after British forces left York.

The fort was occupied by the American forces after the town's surrender. During the brief occupation, members of the militia were detained in the fort for two days before being released on "parole". The British dead were buried within the fort in shallow graves, although they were later reburied outside the fort after the Americans departed the town. Government House, already damaged by the gunpowder magazine explosion, was razed by American forces on 1 May 1813. Before they departed from York, the American forces razed several more buildings including most of the structures in the fort, except its barracks.

=== Rebuilt fort (1813–1932) ===
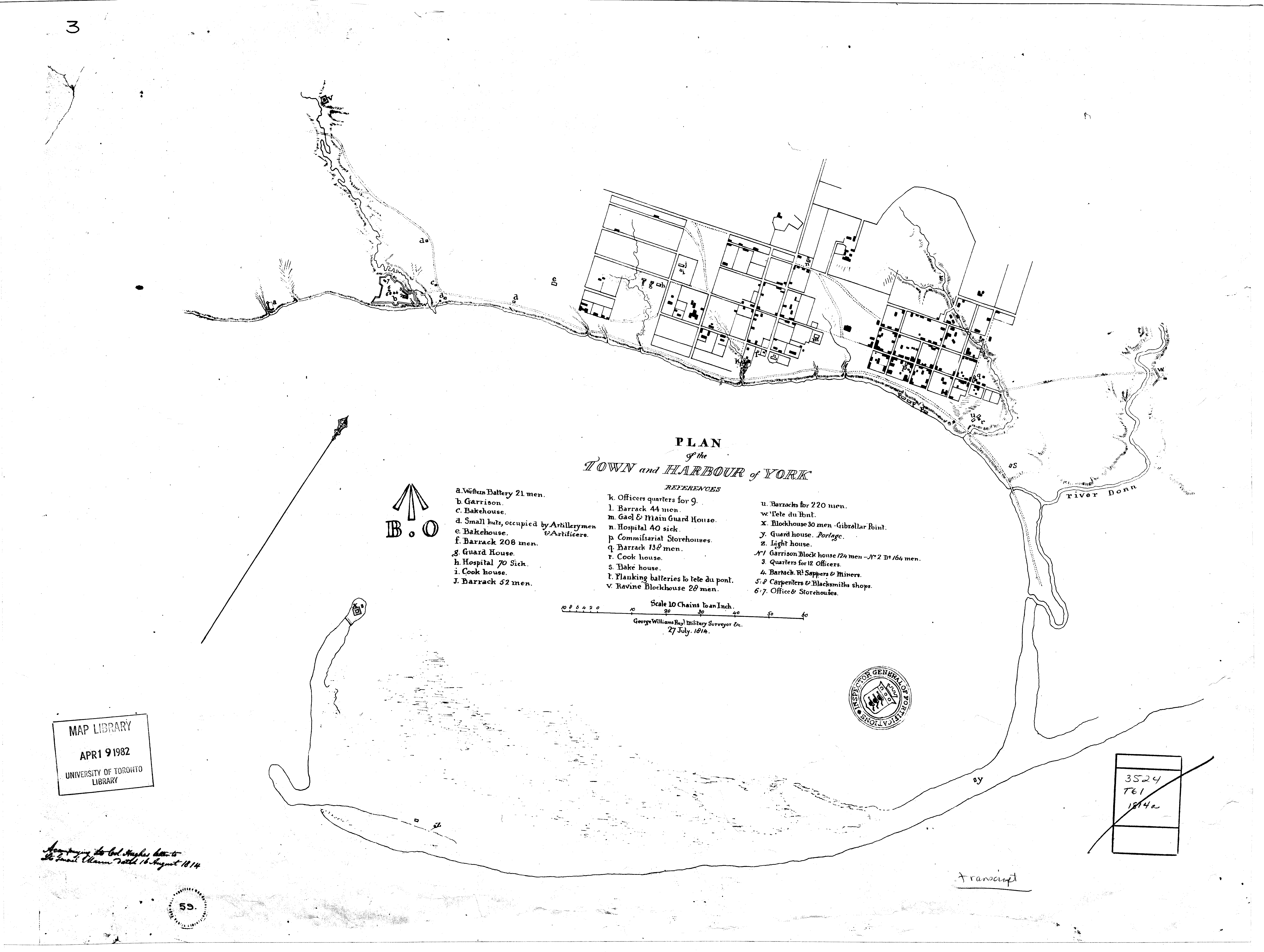
Map of Fort York and the settlement in 1814

Plans to rebuild the settlement's defences, including the fort, and the surrounding blockhouses were undertaken in the second half of 1813 to defend a four-vessel squadron the Royal Navy planned to station at York's harbour. Several structures were completed at the fort by November 1813, including the Government House Battery and the Circular Battery, each equipped with two 8 in (20 cm) mortars; with another two blockhouses nearing completion. The blockhouses were also designed to act as barracks for the town's garrison, in order to allow for the immediate garrisoning of troops in the settlement. In the following years, the forest around the fort was cleared to deprive Americans of cover in the event of another attack; and the defensive earthworks, barracks, and gunpowder magazine were rebuilt. The fort was not completed until around 1815; due to small numbers of artificer available at York, and a warm 1813–14 winter preventing the use of sleighs to transport supplies during that season.

The fort operated as a hospital centre from the latter half of 1813 to the end of the war, with the naval squadron stationed at York assisting in transporting wounded soldiers from the Niagara front to the town. On 6 August 1814, an American naval squadron arrived near York's harbour, under the suspicion that British vessels were stationed there. The squadron dispatched the USS Lady of the Lake to sail into the harbour under a white flag in a ploy to evaluate the town's defences. However, the militia stationed in the fort shot at the vessel, resulting in the two sides exchanging fire before the Lady of the Lake withdrew back to its squadron outside the harbour. The American squadron did not attempt another attack on the fort, although remained outside York's harbour for three days before sailing away.

==== Post War of 1812 ====
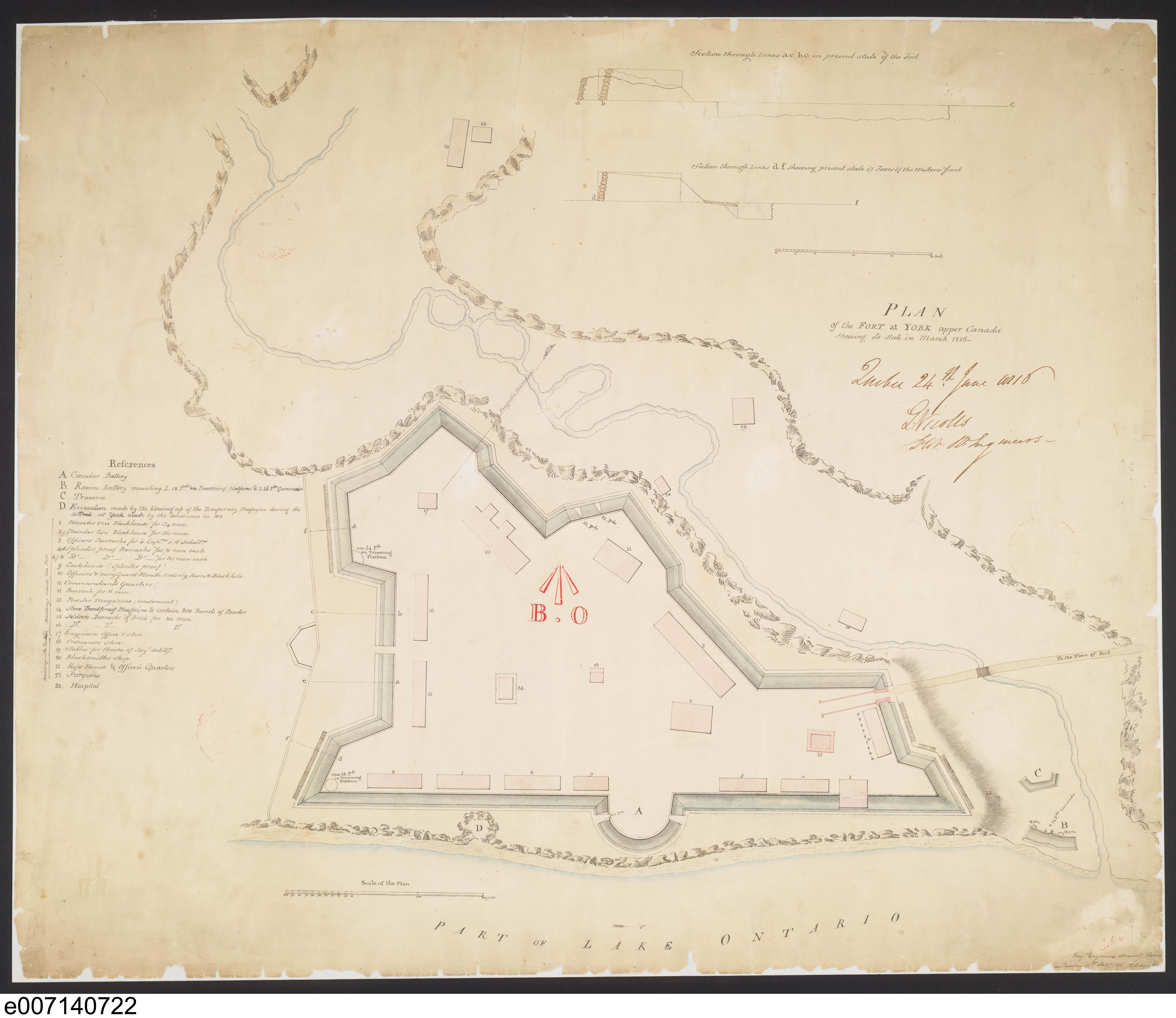
Diagram of Fort York, 1816

Work on the fort came to an immediate halt at the end of the war. By 1816, the rebuilt fort included eighteen buildings capable of holding a garrison of 650 soldiers. An additional 350 soldiers were also capable of being garrisoned in military facilities adjacent to the fort. After the war, the fort continued to be a point of focus for military planners in the region, with York envisioned as an area that could provide cover for a retreat to Kingston and Lower Canada, or as a rallying point for British forces to defend the Niagara peninsula. The British also continued to use the fort to protect the north-south portage route to the upper Great Lakes.

In the decades after the War of 1812, several buildings within the fort were torn down and replaced. However, the fort's conditions was largely shaped by British foreign relations; as it suffered from poor maintenance during times of peace, and underwent repairs and reinforcing during perceived signs of hostilities. By the early 1830s, it had become apparent that new fortifications needed to be built to replace the decaying Fort York, with a plan formally approved in 1833. Completed in 1841, New Fort York was situated 847 m (2,779 ft) west of Fort York, and was initially only connected to a settlement via a pathway through Fort York. Although new fortifications were erected, the military continued to use Fort York's batteries to help defend the harbour; and the adjacent open space for drills, and as a rifle range. In addition to its military uses, from 1839 to 1840, the old fort also hosted a Royal Society meteorological and magnetic observatory, before it was relocated to its permanent location at the University of King's College campus. Plans were in place to also build three martello towers between Fort York and Gibraltar Point, although those plans were abandoned.

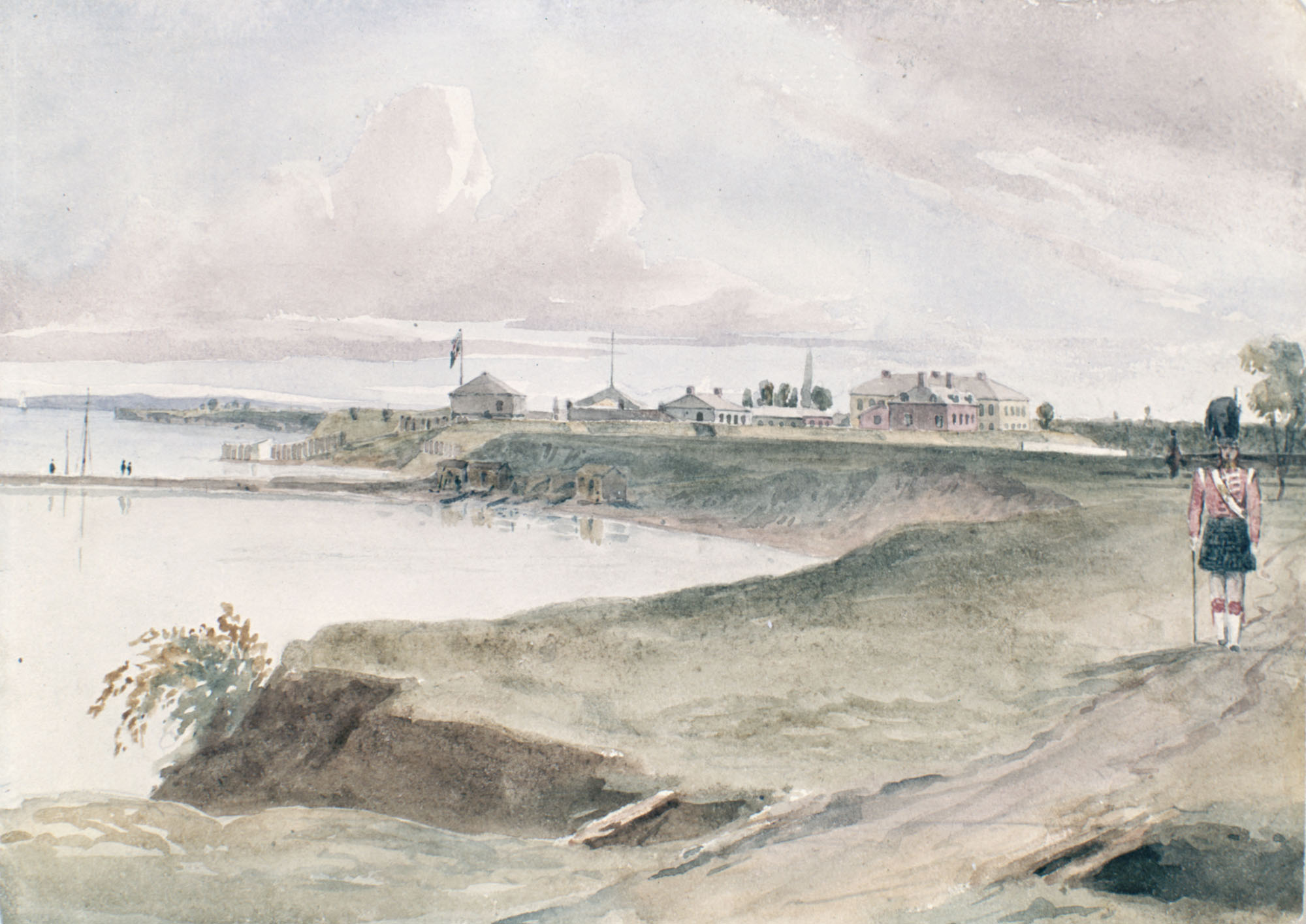
Depiction of Fort York and its docks in 1839

At the onset of the Rebellions of 1837–1838, the garrison at Fort York was dispatched to Lower Canada, resulting in the fort only being manned by 10 regulars of the British Army. The fort was eventually reinforced by the Queen's Rangers after the Battle of Montgomery's Tavern, with members of the militia descending on the city to defend the colonial government. The fort was left virtually unmanned again in 1854 after the garrison was recalled to participate in the Crimean War. During their two-year absence, the fort was largely maintained by a staff of 150 "enrolled pensioners," made up of British Army retirees who were granted land around the city following their retirement.

Deteriorating Anglo-American relations in the 1860s as a result of the Trent Affair prompted the military to look into fortifying the Toronto garrison, using it as a base to repulse, or slow down, a potential invasion of Canada West. The proposal had the shore batteries of the fort dismantled, and replaced with rifled artillery on mobile carriages. The proposal failed to materialize, although continued to be suggested into the 1880s.

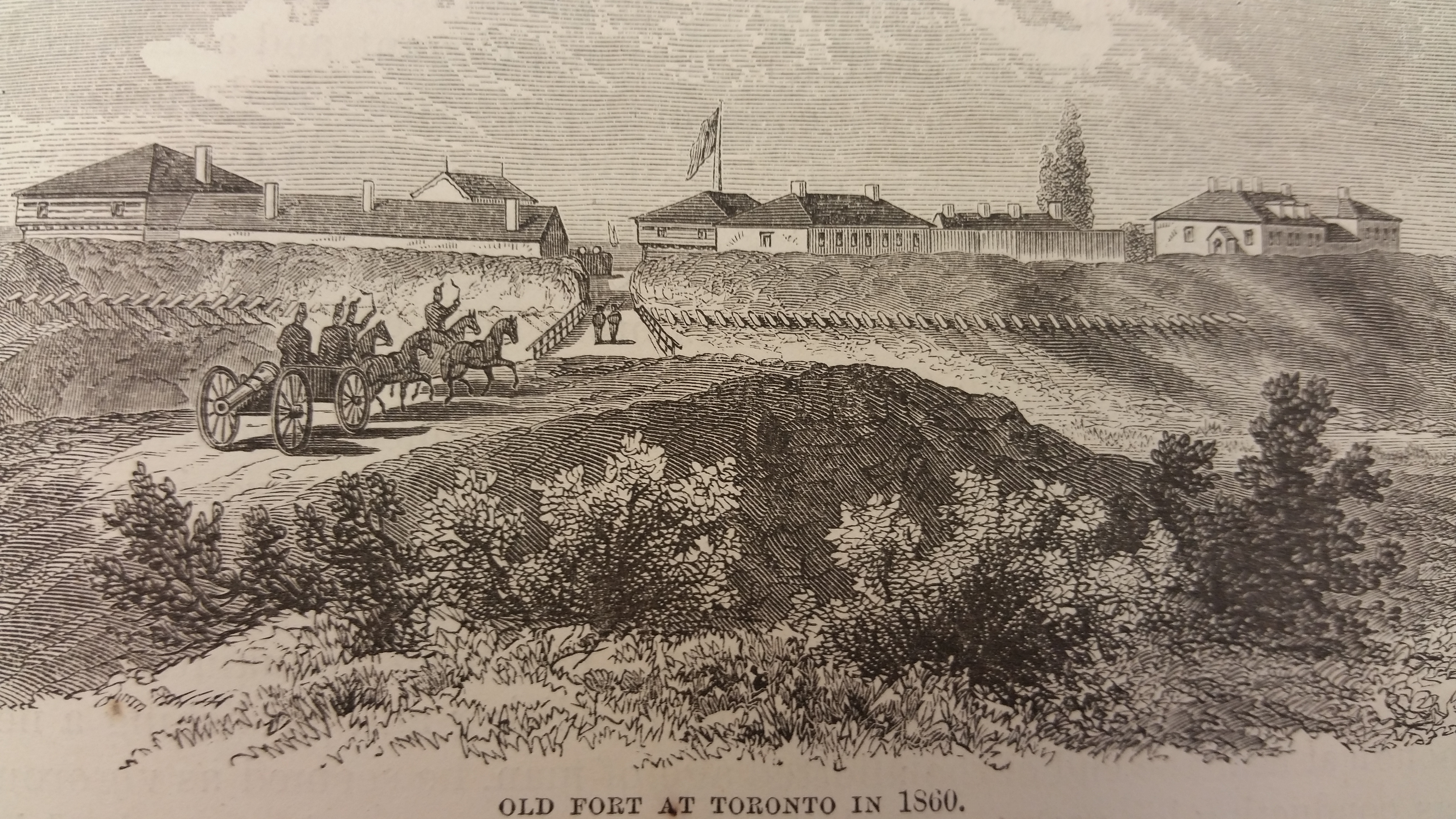
Depiction of Fort York in 1860

In an effort to reduce tensions with the Americans in the lead-up to the signing of the Treaty of Washington, the British began to withdraw its military forces from all its secondary North American garrisons, including Fort York. Fort York was formally handed over to the federal government of Canada on 25 July 1870. The last British imperial troops stationed at Fort York departed in 1871, alongside two Canadian militia regiments as a part of the Wolseley expedition. During the 1870s and 1880s, the provincial and municipal governments inquired about purchasing Fort York, although the offers were rejected by the Department of Militia and Defence; as the old fort served as New Fort York's only access point to the rest of the city, as well as its rifle range. The fort was also used as familial quarters for regulars, militia offices, storage space, and as a training ground. During the Second Boer War, and the First World War, the fort was also used as a local enlistment centre.

In 1903, an agreement was reached between the municipal government of Toronto to purchase the old fort, as well as New Fort York. As a part of the deed of transfer from the Department of Militia and Defence, the city agreed to preserve, and "properly care for" the old fort. The agreement also allowed the military to continue to use as much of the property as they needed until newer facilities were built for them. The Canadian militia continued to occupy the fort as a storehouse for ammunition and supplies, and as dwellings for military families until the 1930s when restorations of the fort were underway.

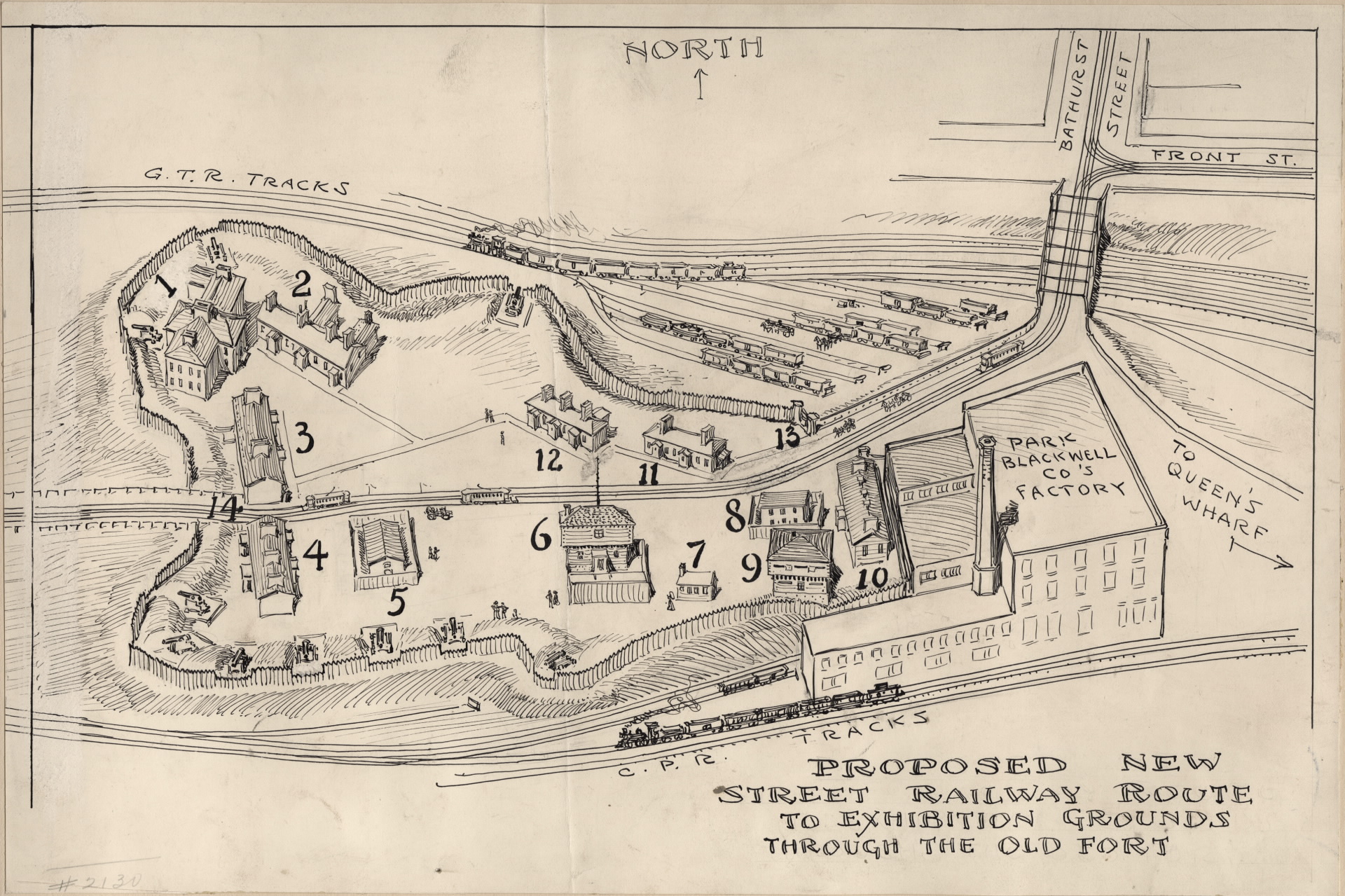
Depiction of a 1905 proposal for a streetcar route through Fort York. The proposal was not acted on due to heavy public opposition.

In 1905, a proposal to build a streetcar through Fort York prompted historical, and military organizations to form the "Old Fort Protective Association". Although the streetcar proposal never came to fruition, appeals from the association, political figures, and the Toronto media led Canadian prime minister Wilfrid Laurier to place new conditions on the fort's deed of transfer, requiring the city to restore the old fort to its original condition, or have the adjacent commons revert to federal ownership. The property was formally transferred from the Department of Militia and Defence to the municipal government in 1909.

On 25 May 1923, Fort York was designated as a National Historic Site of Canada.

=== Repurposing into a museum (1932–present) ===
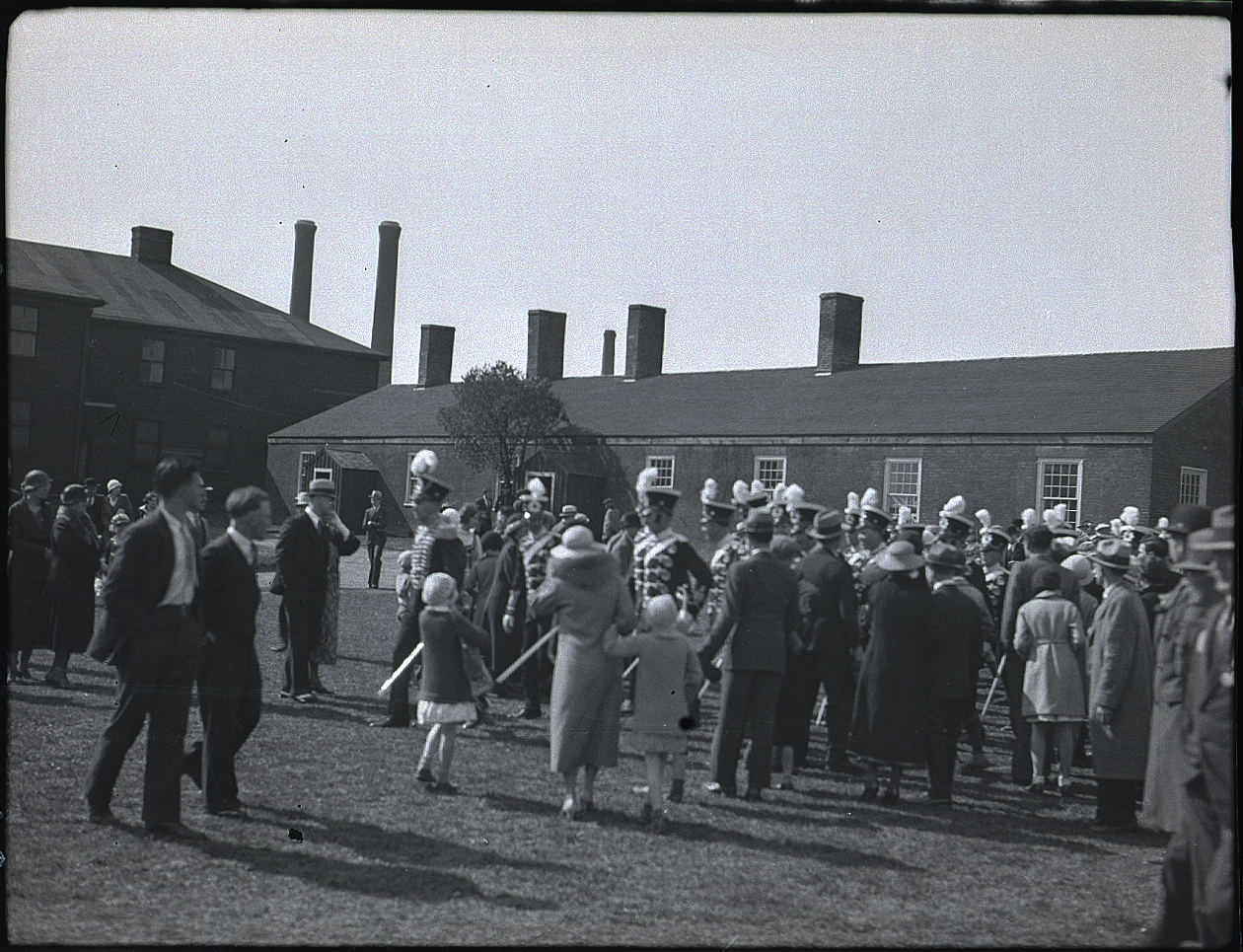
The Queen's Rangers, a Non-Permanent Active Militia unit, parading in the fort during the inaugural year of the property's reopening into a historic museum.

In 1932, the municipal government of Toronto undertook a two-year restoration of Fort York, converting the fort into a historic site and museum. The city began to restore the fort to its 1816 configuration as a make-work program, and to celebrate the centennial of the incorporation of Toronto. As a result of the restoration, the Canadian militia ended its occupancy of the fort, although the military briefly reused parts of Fort York during the Second World War. In order to accommodate the military, Fort York Armoury was built between Fort York and New Fort York in the 1930s.

Fort York was formally reopened as a museum on Victoria Day in 1934. A historical reenactment unit dressed as infantry soldiers, fifers and drummers was also maintained to support museum operations.

In 1949, management of the fort was transferred from Toronto Parks Division, to the Toronto Civic Historical Committee (predecessor of the Toronto Historical Board). Further restoration work on the site was also carried out that year.

In 1958, the government of Metropolitan Toronto proposed to move Fort York along Toronto's contemporary waterfront, whose location was now further south from the fort as a result of land reclamation projects during the late 1800s and early 1900s. The regional government proposed the move in an effort to make way for the Gardiner Expressway, and to "recreate" the fort's original setting by the shoreline. However, the proposal was eventually rejected due to public opposition, with the planned expressway rerouted around the fort. The public effort to save the fort served as the impetus for the historic preservation movement in Toronto, as well as the foundations for the Toronto Historical Board.

The fort was included in the City of Toronto's inaugural inventory of heritage properties in 1973, with the entire precinct later designated as a provincial "heritage conservation district" in 1985. Several excavations were conducted between 1976 and 2011 to determine the exact location of several demolished buildings, and the initial topography of the fort.

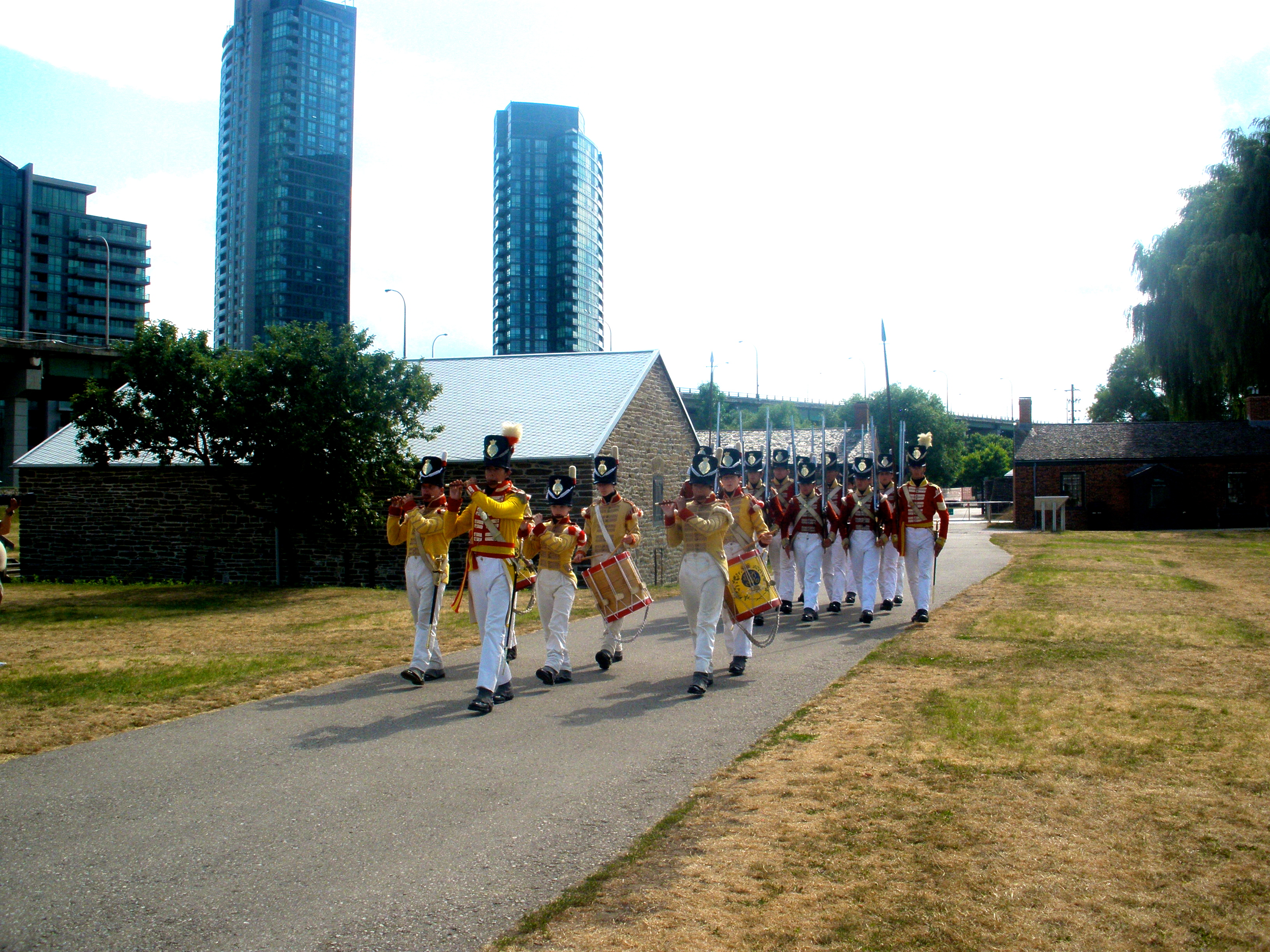
The Fort York Guard march past the fort's stone-walled gunpowder magazine. These historical reenactors were employed at the site until 2022.

In 1994, the Friends of Fort York and Garrison Common was formed by local residents, with the organization later incorporated as a registered charity to support the national historic site. In the same year, the Toronto Historical Board reconstituted the Fort York Guard historical animation unit that had operated until the mid-1980s. Management of the Guard, which employed high school and university students clad in the uniforms of the Canadian Regiment of Fencible Infantry, was later assumed by the Friends of Fort York. The Guard enlivened the site with musket, artillery, and music demonstrations in the summer months until 2022 when the municipal government suspended the grant used to support it, reportedly in the belief that living history displays perpetuated colonialism.

Following the amalgamation of Toronto in 1997, museum operations fell under the city's Museum and Heritage Services. However, in 2000, Toronto City Council transferred management of the fort to a board of citizen appointees, separate from the other municipally-operated museums in Toronto.

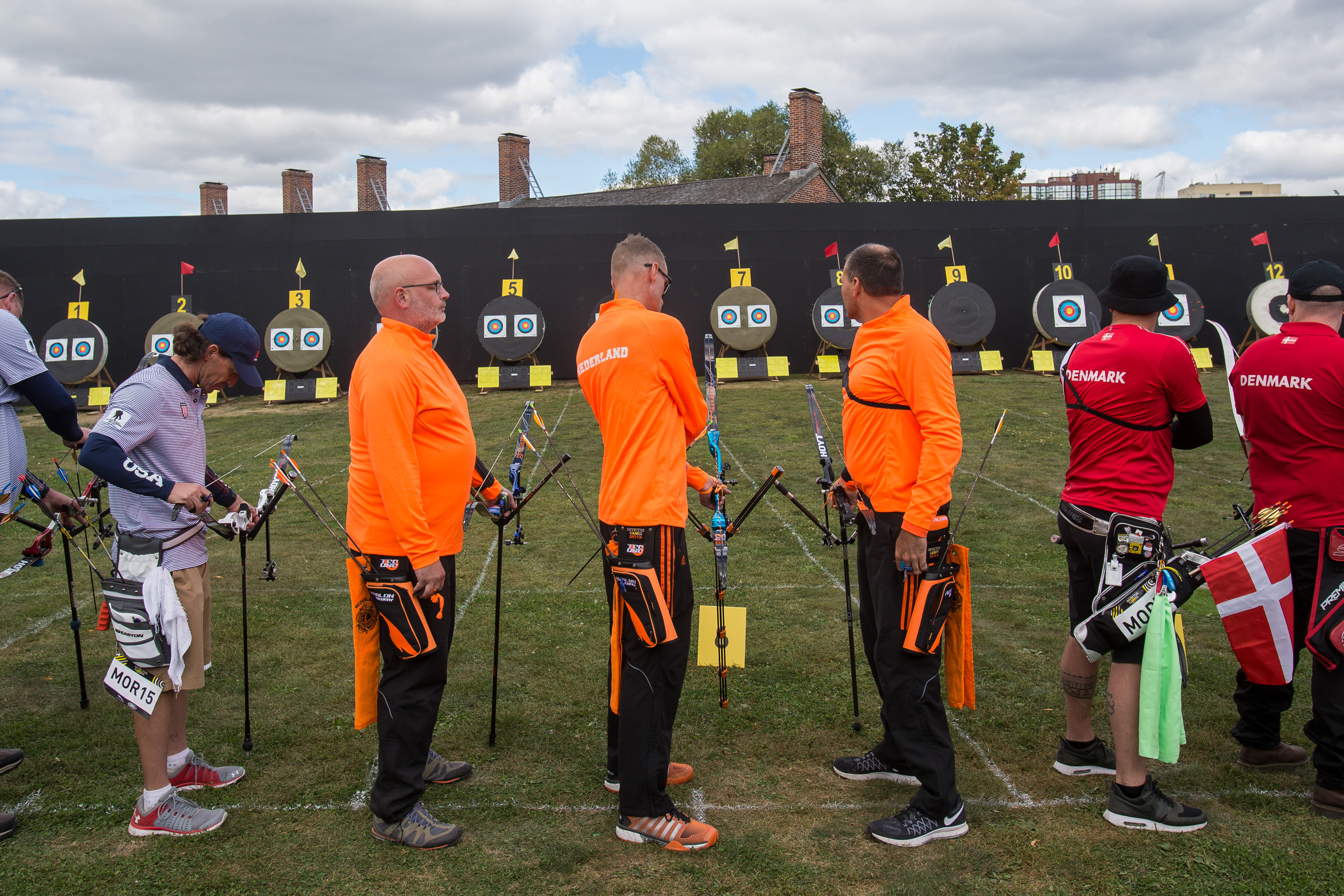
The archery event for the 2017 Invictus Games, held inside Fort York

In September 2017, Fort York served as the archery venue for the 2017 Invictus Games, a multi-parasports event for wounded, injured or sick armed forces personnel. The site was used during the 2026 FIFA World Cup, hosting the Toronto FIFA Fan Festival.

== Grounds ==
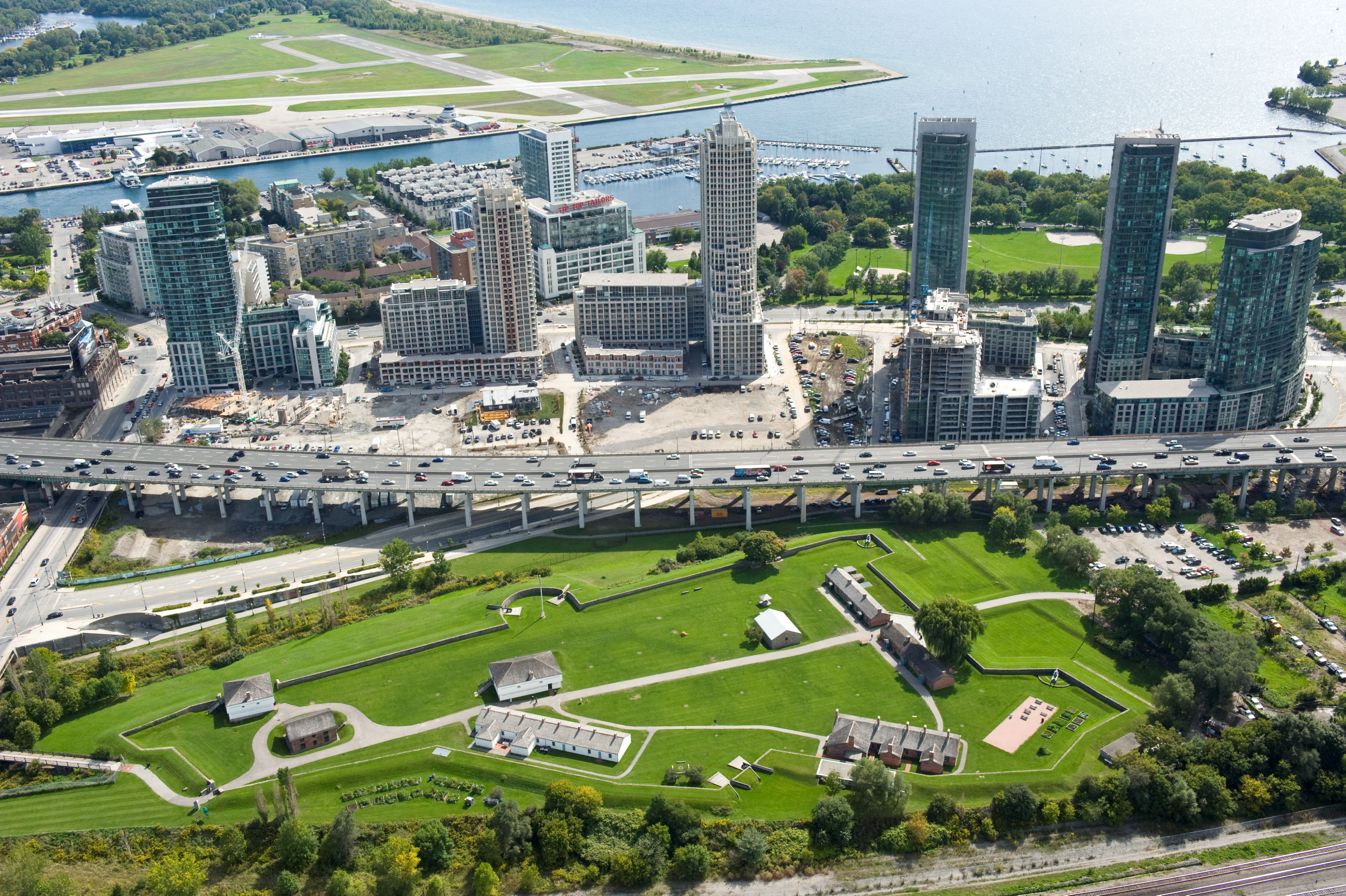
Fort York and the Toronto waterfront to the south of it. The fort is situated along the city's original shoreline, with the lands south of the fort being formed through land reclamation projects.

Fort York National Historic Site occupies approximately 16.6 ha (41 acres) of land. When the fort was initially established, it was situated along the Toronto waterfront. However, decades of land reclamation projects beginning in 1850 resulted in the fort being situated 900 m (980 yd) inland by the 1920s. At one point, the military reserve that the fort was on was 311 ha (768 acres), although its size slowly shrank as portions of the reserve were partitioned to build housing and factories. The grounds is the property of the municipal government of Toronto and is one of several National Historic Sites of Canada not owned or maintained by Parks Canada.

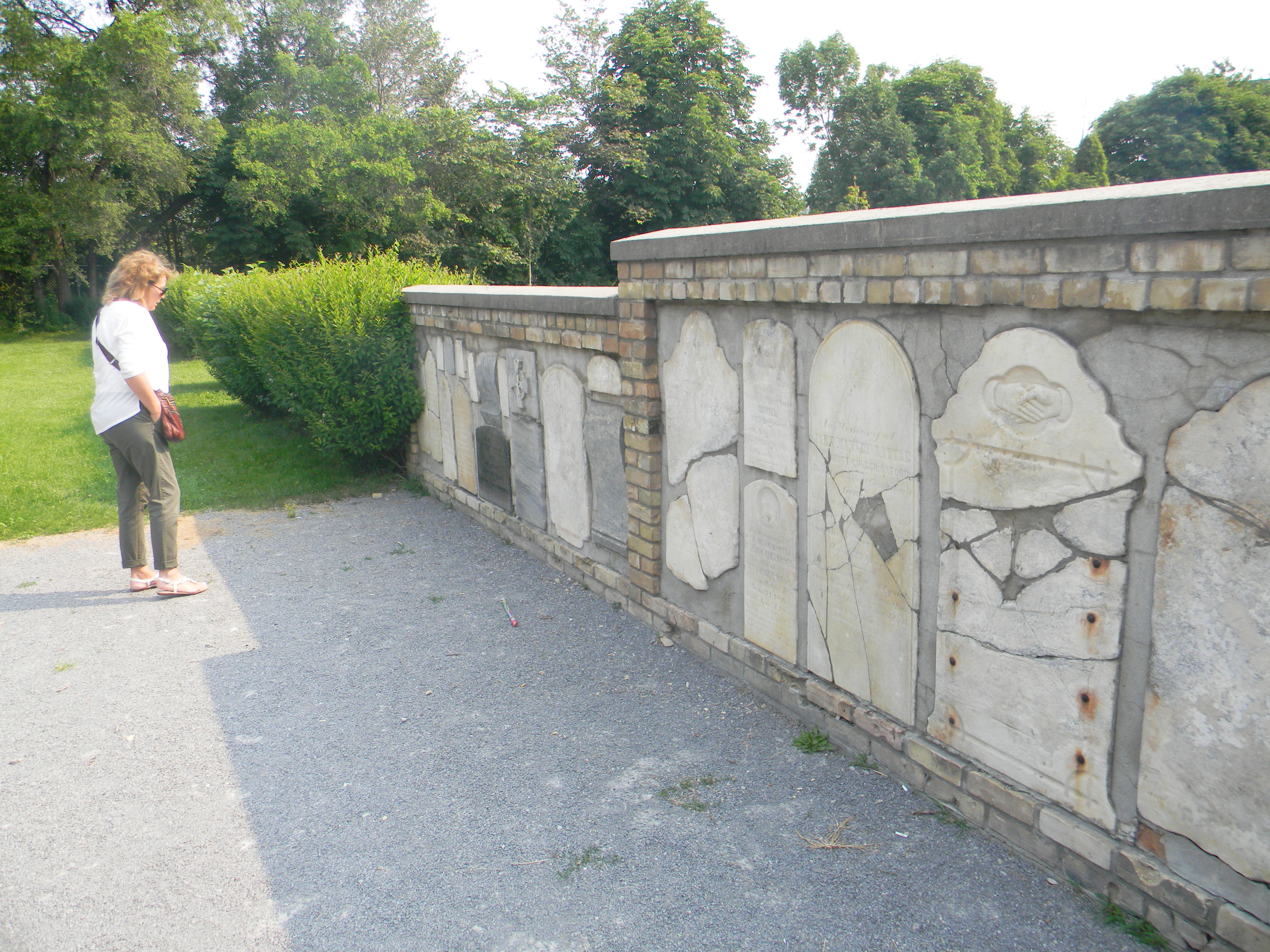
Headstones of the former military burial grounds at Garrison Common

The national historic site includes Fort York, the mustering grounds west of the fort known as Garrison Common, the visitor centre, and military cemeteries situated to the north of the fort; including cemeteries and green spaces physically separated from the rest of the national historic site by the Railway Lands. The parkland north of the Railway Lands is connected to the rest of the historic site by two pedestrian and cycle bridges known as Garrison Crossing. Completed in 2019, the two bridges are the first bridges in Canada to be made entirely of stainless steel. The cemetery was used for the interment of soldiers and their families from 1793 to 1863. A portion of the cemetery was later renamed Victoria Memorial Square. Several of the original headstones used in the cemetery were later utilized to create a memorial at Victoria Memorial Square.

In 2004, the provincial heritage conversation district was expanded to include Fort York Armoury, located southwest of the visitor centre. However, as opposed to the rest of the historic site, Fort York Armoury remains in use as a drill hall and armoury for the Canadian Army, with the Department of National Defence acting as the custodians for the building.

The grounds of the national historic site, including Garrison Common, the military cemeteries, and the parkland is accessible to the public year-round. However, access to the fort and the visitor centre is limited by the museum's operating hours.

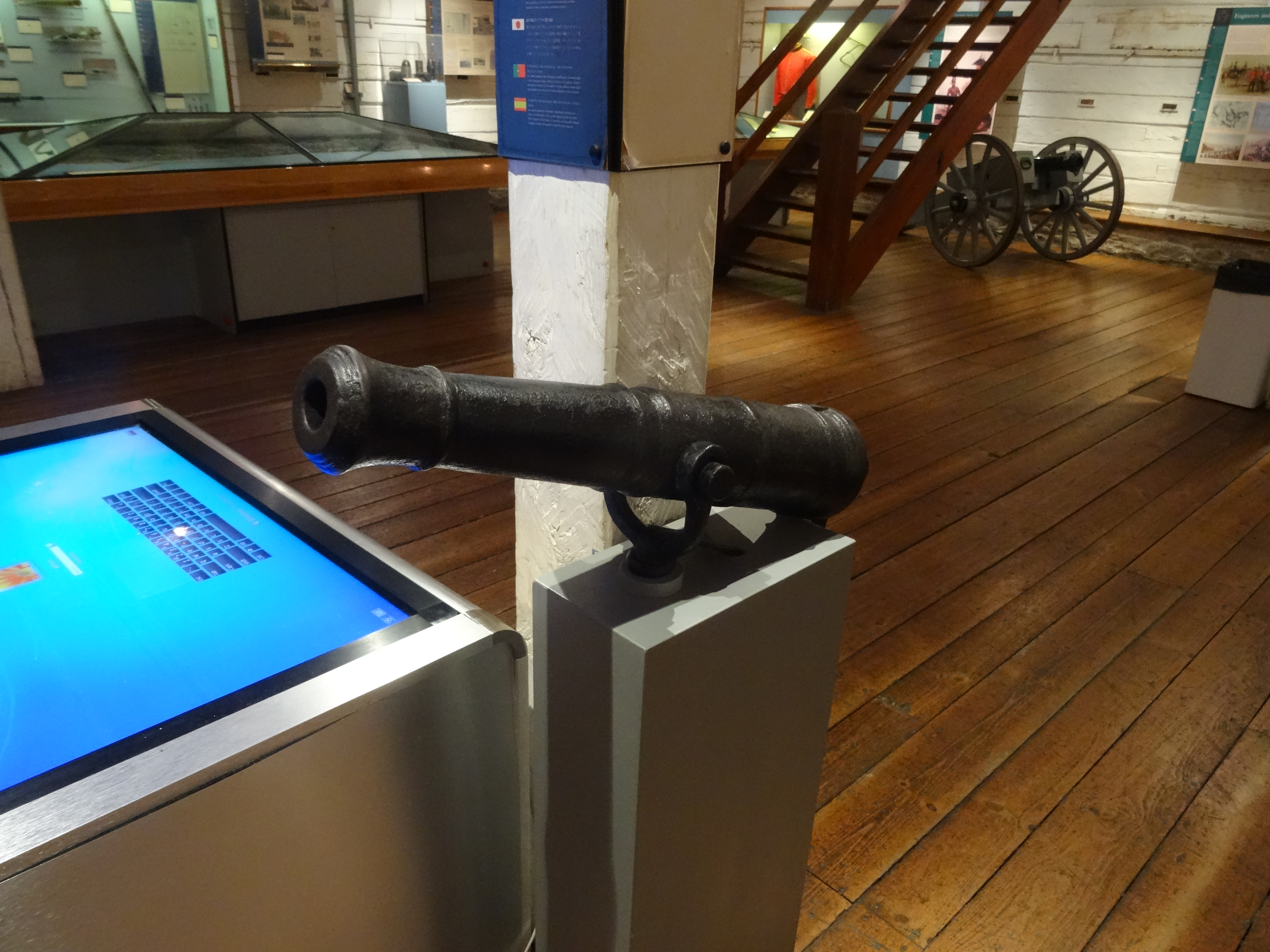
Artifacts in an exhibit inside the fort's blockhouse. Exhibits are spread throughout the fort and visitor centre.

Exhibits on the War of 1812, and military life in 19th century Canada are displayed in the buildings inside the fort, and the visitor centre.

=== Fort ===
The fort complex occupies approximately 3.24 ha (8.0 acres) of land, and includes the bastioned, stone-lined earthwork, and buildings within it. The fort is the only remaining authentic fort that was built in Canada during the War of 1812, with its defensive earthworks, and seven buildings dating to its 1813–15 reconstruction. The buildings within the fort also form the largest collection of buildings in Canada that date back from the War of 1812.

The fort itself contains eight historical buildings, seven of which date back to the fort's reconstruction from 1813 to 1815, while the eighth building is a reconstruction of a barracks that previously stood at the fort. Buildings that date back to the fort's 1813–15 reconstruction include the two blockhouses, two soldiers barracks, the officers' "brick barracks" and mess hell, a brick-walled magazine, and a stone-walled magazine. The following buildings are all situated in their original arrangements and uses their original materials, design, and finishes. The stone magazine is a store for ammunition and gunpowder, whose walls are 2 m (6.6 ft) thick, and features a vaulted bomb-proof door. Problems in the magazine's foundations shortly after its completion led to the construction of the brick magazine.

In addition to its historical buildings, the fort also contains several small modern facilities used for museum operations. These include a modern kitchen and washrooms built into the northern ramparts of the fort, and a small gunpowder magazine dating to the 1970s.

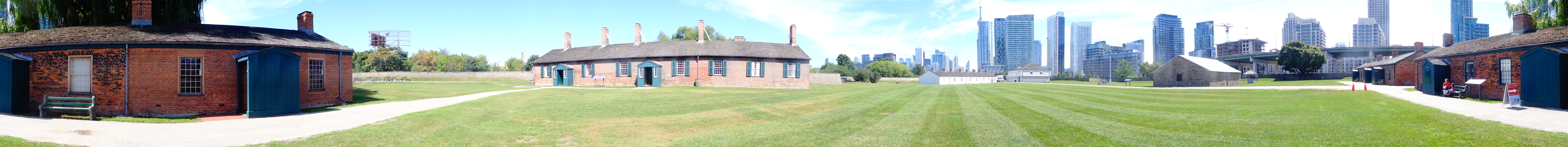
Panorama of the interior of the fort from its central parade ground

==== Barracks ====
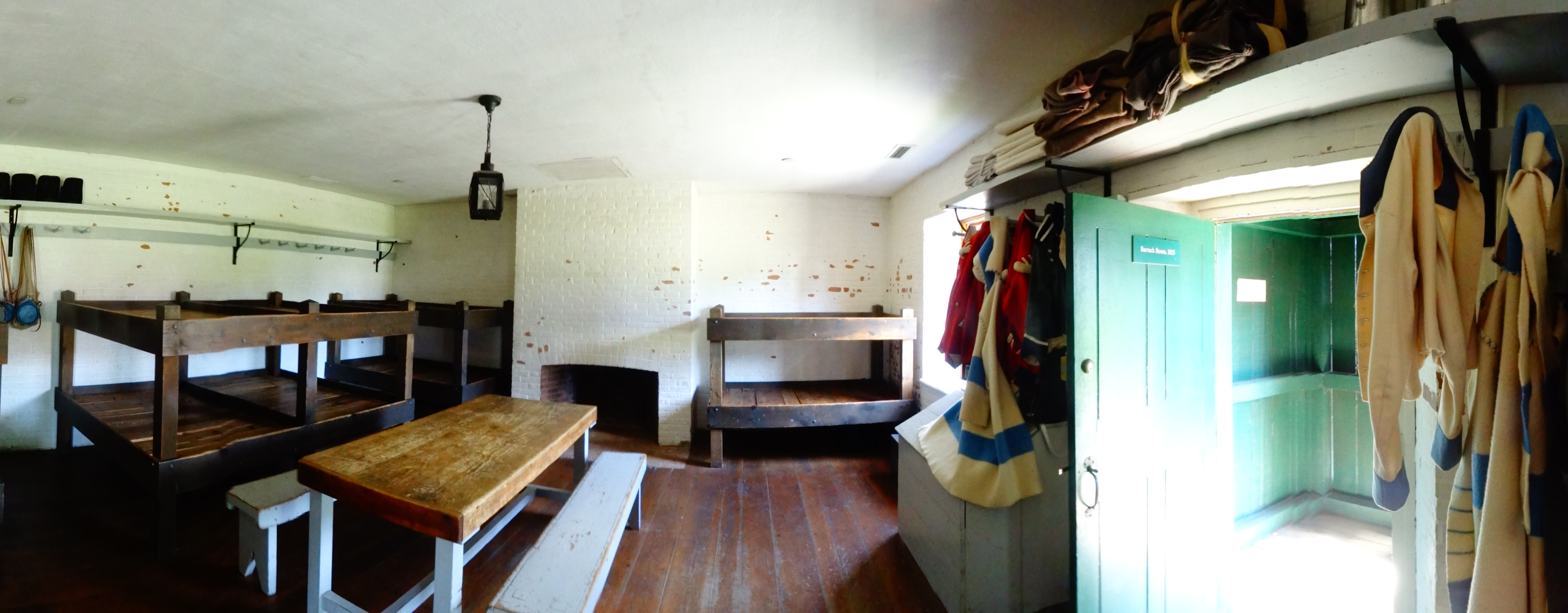
Interior of the enlisted barracks

Three barracks date back to the fort's 1813–15 reconstruction, two enlisted barracks, and one officers' barracks and mess hall. The living space provided in the officers' barracks contrasted greatly living spaces provided for enlisted soldiers. The two enlisted barracks at the fort housed a larger number of soldiers and their families, although, by the 1860s, these barracks were largely used as married quarters for only three soldiers and their families.

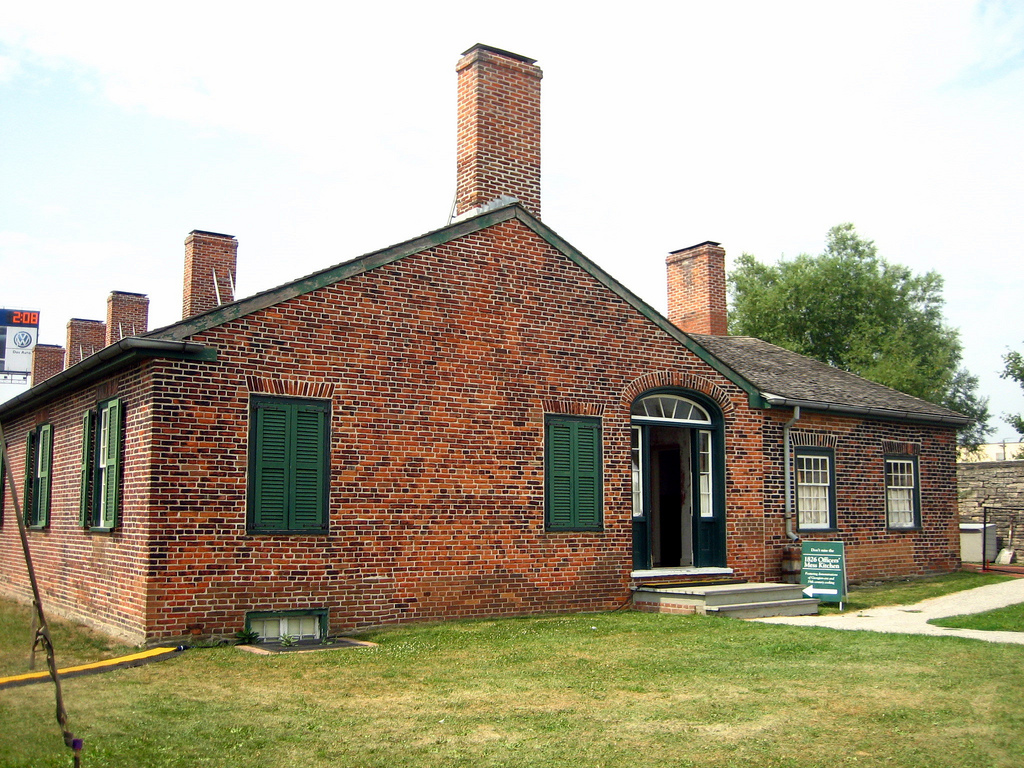
Exterior of the officers' barracks and kitchen

Restored to its 1830s configuration, the brick officers' barrack holds two apartments for officers; with each apartment holding four living quarters for officers, and a kitchen/servant's room. The mess hall portion of the brick barracks was designed as a general officers' mess hall and has two access points, one to the outside, and another to the barracks portion of the building. Servant rooms were also provided with a separate entry point from the rest of the barracks. The officers' brick barracks also contain the city's "oldest kitchen," with a steep staircase in the kitchen pantry leading to the basement kitchen. The oven remains in the kitchen, although its floors have been removed for archeological studies. A ground-level kitchen was added to the building in 1826.

The fourth barracks inside the fort, the blue officer' barracks and mess hall, is a reconstruction of a junior officer's barracks that stood on the site. The single-storey reconstruction is made up of four apartments, each containing four separate quarters connected by a central hall for three officers and a servant's room/kitchen. The blue barracks reconstruction was built in 1986.

==== Blockhouses ====
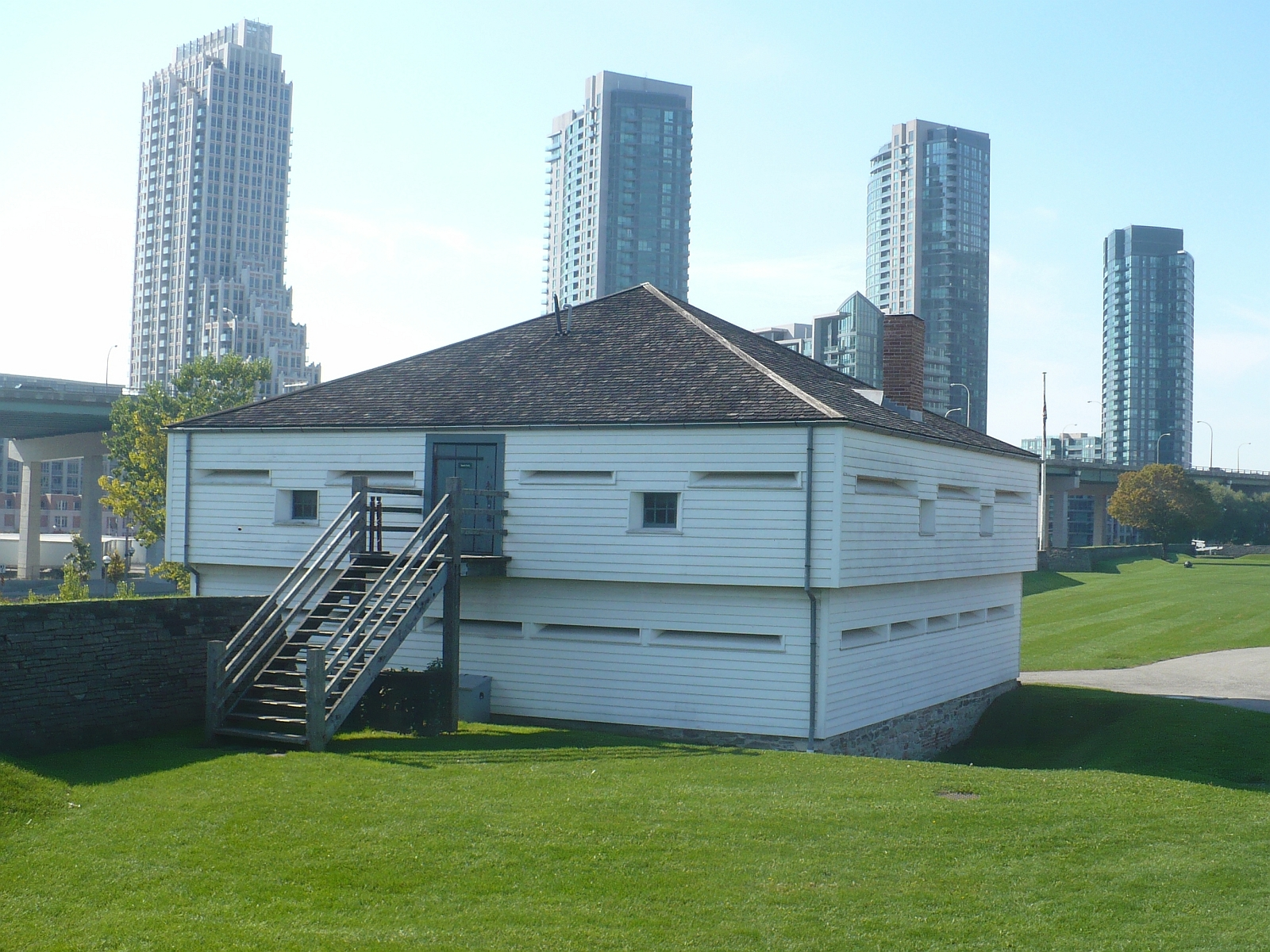
Blockhouse No. 1

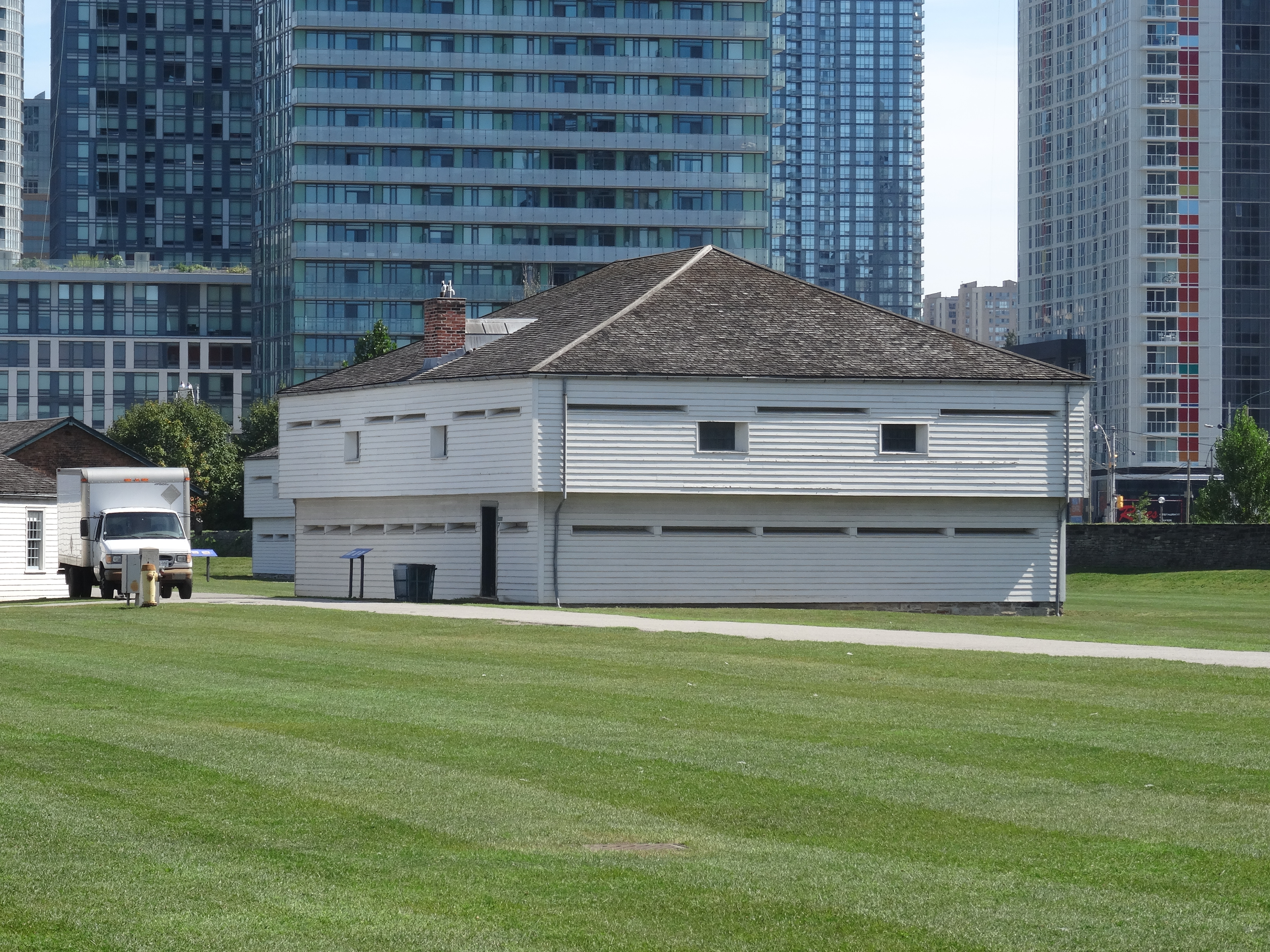
Blockhouse No. 2

The blockhouses of Fort York were designed to defend the rear approaches of the shore batteries, and serve as a citadel for the fort

As with several other British-designed fortifications for the time, the fort's two blockhouses featured splinter-proof constructions, loopholes and portholes for small arms and small artillery pieces, and a second storey that overhangs off the first. However, contrasting other blockhouses built by the British during this period, the blockhouses at Fort York included cellar storage and magazine facilities; although lacked windows on the first floor, deemed too dangerous to place in the blockhouses. The levels of the blockhouses were designed so that they may isolate themselves from the other floor of the blockhouse, in the event the other level is penetrated. The foundations of the blockhouses are made of limestone and shale, coursed and laid in lime mortar; whereas the square-timber walls were made of white pine reinforced with trunnels. Clapboards were placed on the exterior wall to improve its impermeability. Both blockhouses featured raised entrances on the second floor facing the east, with the expectation that an attack on the fort would come from the west.

The fort's two blockhouses were positioned north of the fort's shore batteries, defending the rear approaches of the batteries, while the rest of the fort's defences were being built. After the fort was completed, the blockhouses reverted to a secondary role, serving as the fort's citadel. The blockhouses were also designed to act as barracks, with the blockhouse situated in the southeast (Blockhouse No. 1) able to accommodate 120 soldiers, whereas the blockhouse situated near the circular battery (Blockhouse No. 2) is capable of housing 160 soldiers. For a brief period, shortly after the 1837–38 rebellions, both blockhouses were equipped with a dry moat and draw bridge, although these entrenchments were later filled in. The interior of the blockhouses were modified on several occasions to match the contemporary needs of the military, and later the museum.

==== Ramparts ====
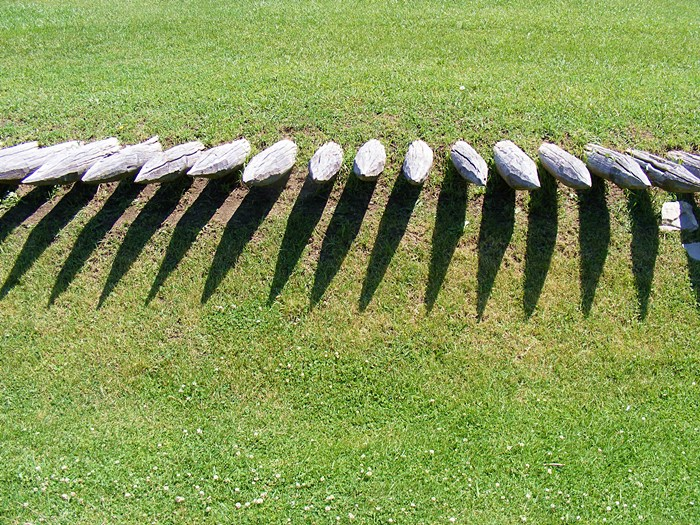
Palisades erected on the ramparts of the fort.

The fort's buildings are surrounded by bastioned, stone-lined earthwork designed to absorb incoming cannon fire; with room for palisades to be placed on the earthen walls to prevent land assaults. Although land reclamation projects in the 18th and 19th centuries made the fort no longer situated along the Toronto waterfront, the original shoreline embankment is still visible outside the southern ramparts of the fort.

The location of the ramparts has also been modified throughout the decades, with the ramparts having been refortified/rebuilt in 1838, the 1860s, and the 1930s. In 1916, the northeastern portion of the ramparts was demolished to make way for the Bathurst streetcar route. The northeastern portion of the ramparts was rebuilt in the 1930s when the municipal government was restoring the rest of the fort. However, due to the growth of the Railway Lands in the previous decade, the northern portion of the ramparts was rebuilt further south from its original location; with the wall's reconstruction also necessitating the demolition of a barracks. During the same period, the fort's southern ramparts were also raised 1.6 m (5.2 ft) from its earlier configuration and moved approximately 5 m (16 ft) north.

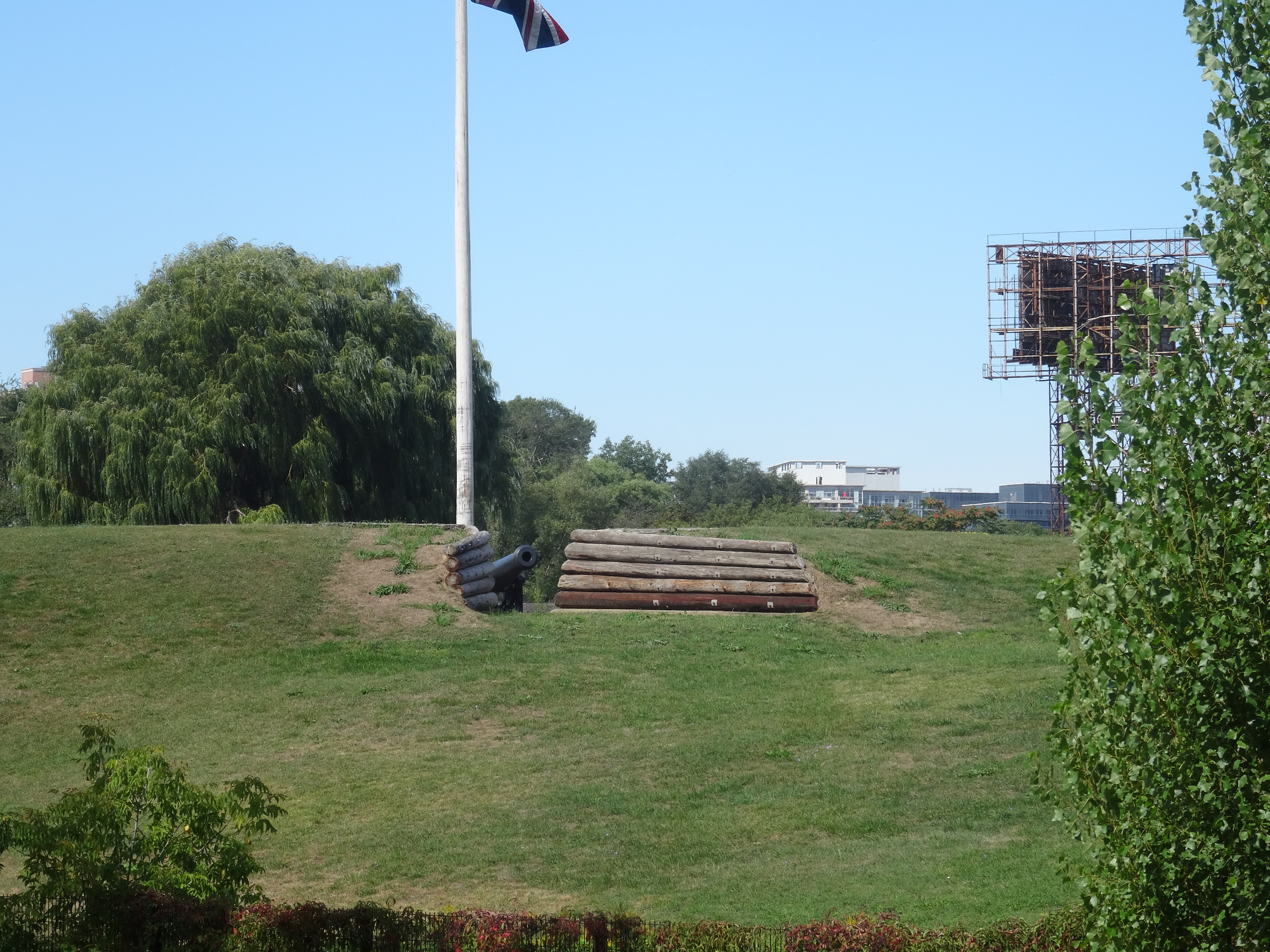
Exterior view of the ramparts

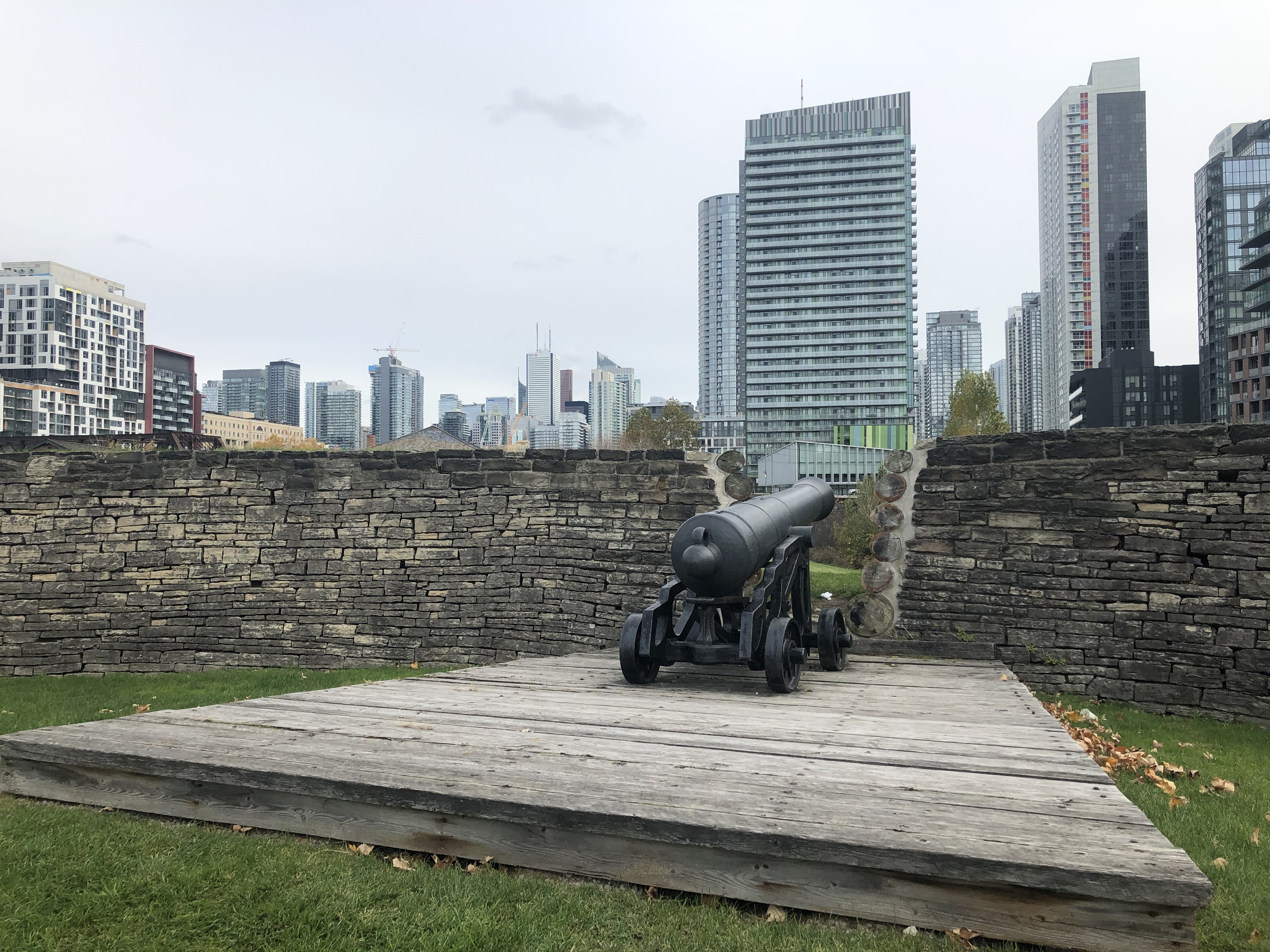
Interior view of the ramparts

Gun placements on Fort York's ramparts

The fort and its ramparts have nine gun placements, although the fort's design had intended for more gun placement in other strategic areas inside the fort during wartime. The central "circular battery" on the fort's southern ramparts was expanded in 1828 to accommodate more guns. Palisades were erected along the earthen wall during the 1860s, in addition to the construction of parapets, and an additional seven-gun battery along the southern ramparts.

==== Demolished structures ====
Several other buildings were also erected within the fort that were later demolished. There remains little trace of the fort's original topography, or its original structures, most of which are buried underground. The remains of the original fort built in 1793 are situated under the present fort, with the remains of the first Government House buried under the fort's parade grounds. Debris and ruins from the battle in April 1813 were also later buried and deposited in the crater created by the detonation of the gunpowder magazine. The location of the gunpowder magazine that was ignited during the battle is marked by a maple tree, and contains a plaque commemorating the Rush-Bagot Treaty, a treaty signed shortly after the War of 1812 that led to the demilitarization of the Great Lakes.

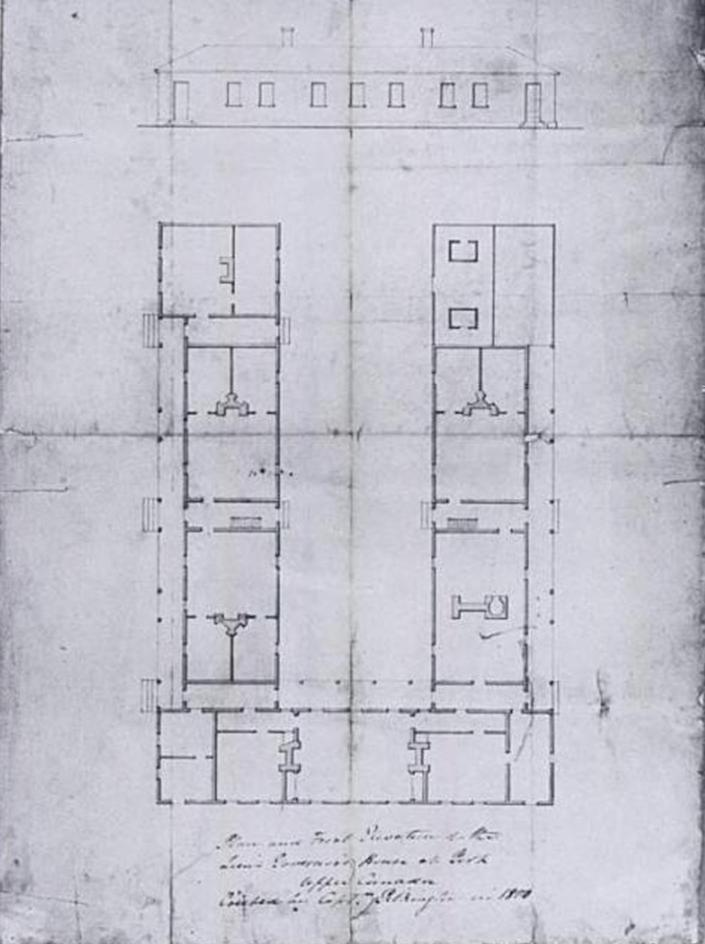
Plans for the first Government House within the fort. Built c. 1800, the building was destroyed in 1813. Its remains are buried under the present fort.

Several buildings were erected during the fort's 1813–15 reconstruction, with the fort holding 18 buildings in 1816. However, a number of these buildings were later demolished, including the carpenter's shop, the sappers' and miners' barracks, the soldiers' barracks, and a cook house along the southern ramparts. Work on a third blockhouse along the fort's western wall was also underway in 1815, but was destroyed by a fire and was not rebuilt. The carpenter building appeared to have been demolished after 1815, the barracks were demolished in 1822, and the cookhouse was torn down in 1848.

The Commandant's House, "D" Barrack, the artillery barracks and the 1838 cookhouse were also structures within Fort York that were later demolished. However, the area where these cluster of buildings were situated is located north of the present fort; as the fort's northern ramparts were rebuilt further south from its original location during the 1930s restoration.

=== Visitor centre ===
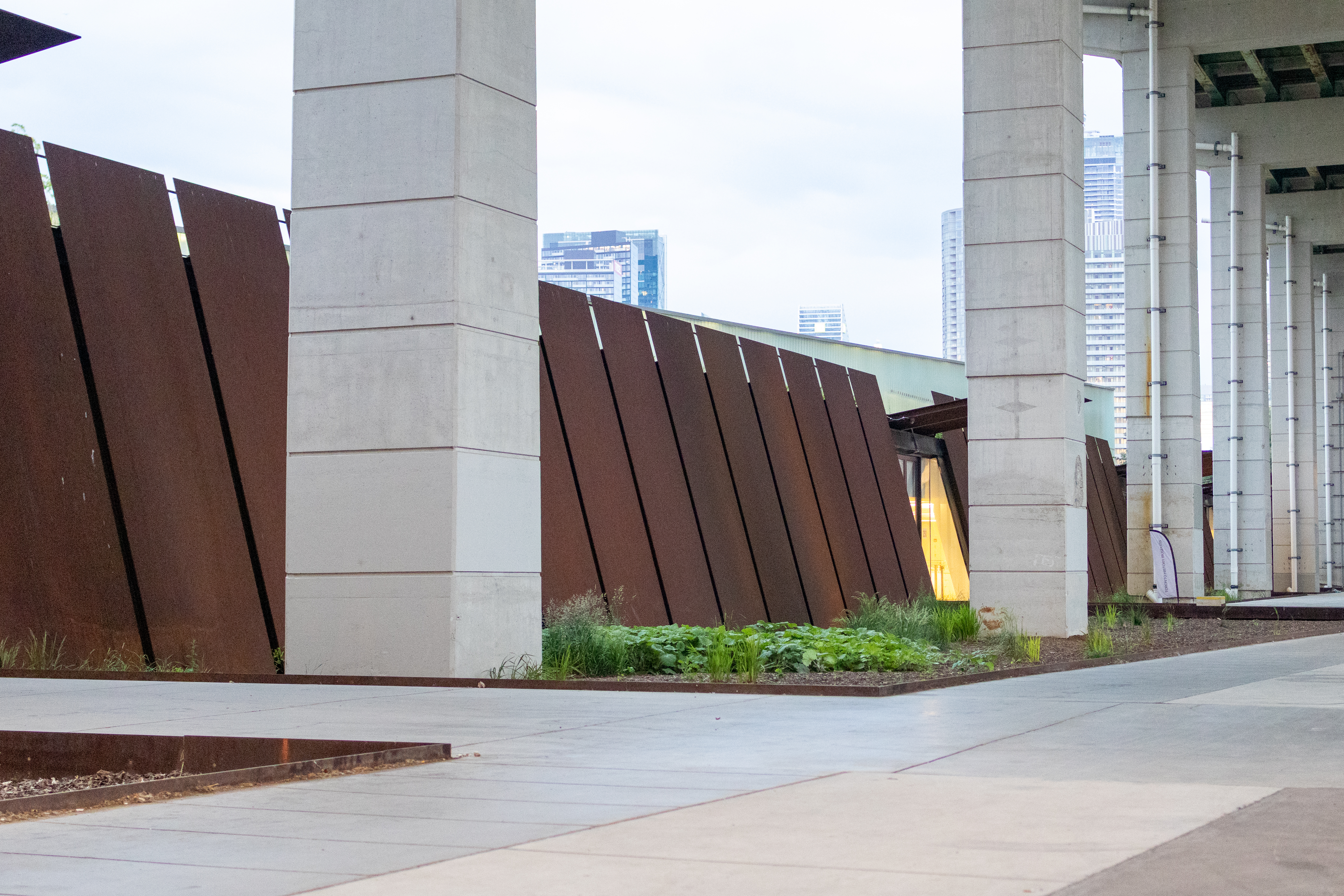
Fort York's visitor centre, directly north of The Bentway

The visitor centre is a 2,500 m^{2} (27,000 sq ft) rectangular building that lies north of the Gardiner Expressway, and south of Garrison Common. The contract to design the building was awarded to Patkau Architects, in collaboration with Kearns Mancini Architects in December 2009. The building was opened to the public in 2014, although was not completed until 2015. The building is built along the original escarpment of Lake Ontario's shoreline, with the building also acting as a retaining wall for the escarpment and Garrison Common directly north of the centre. The roof of the building features a green roof; which also contains the exit to the centre, depositing its visitors to the Garrison Common.

The exterior southern facade of the building is made of monolithic weathering steel panels, reflecting where the historical escarpment and shoreline of the lake would be in the early 19th century. Light permeates into the building through glazed slits between the steel panels for parts of the facade that are covered by the steel panels. Certain parts of the southern facade feature a glass wall, with the steel panels placed in an "awning-like" position allowing visitors outside to glimpse into the museum. All the steel panels are bolted into place, although they can be dismantled when highway maintenance crews require the space.

The interior of the building is designed to circulate visitors through a ramp, from the centre's entrance at the base of the structure, towards an ascending access ramp that leads towards Garrison Common. The visitor centre holds several exhibits including a 270 m^{2} (2,900 sq ft) exhibit of artifacts from the War of 1812, a 45 m^{2} (480 sq ft) vault to display light-sensitive artifacts, and an "immersive exhibit" of the Battle of York. In addition to exhibition galleries, the visitor centre also holds administrative offices, and a community meeting centre.

== Surrounding defences ==
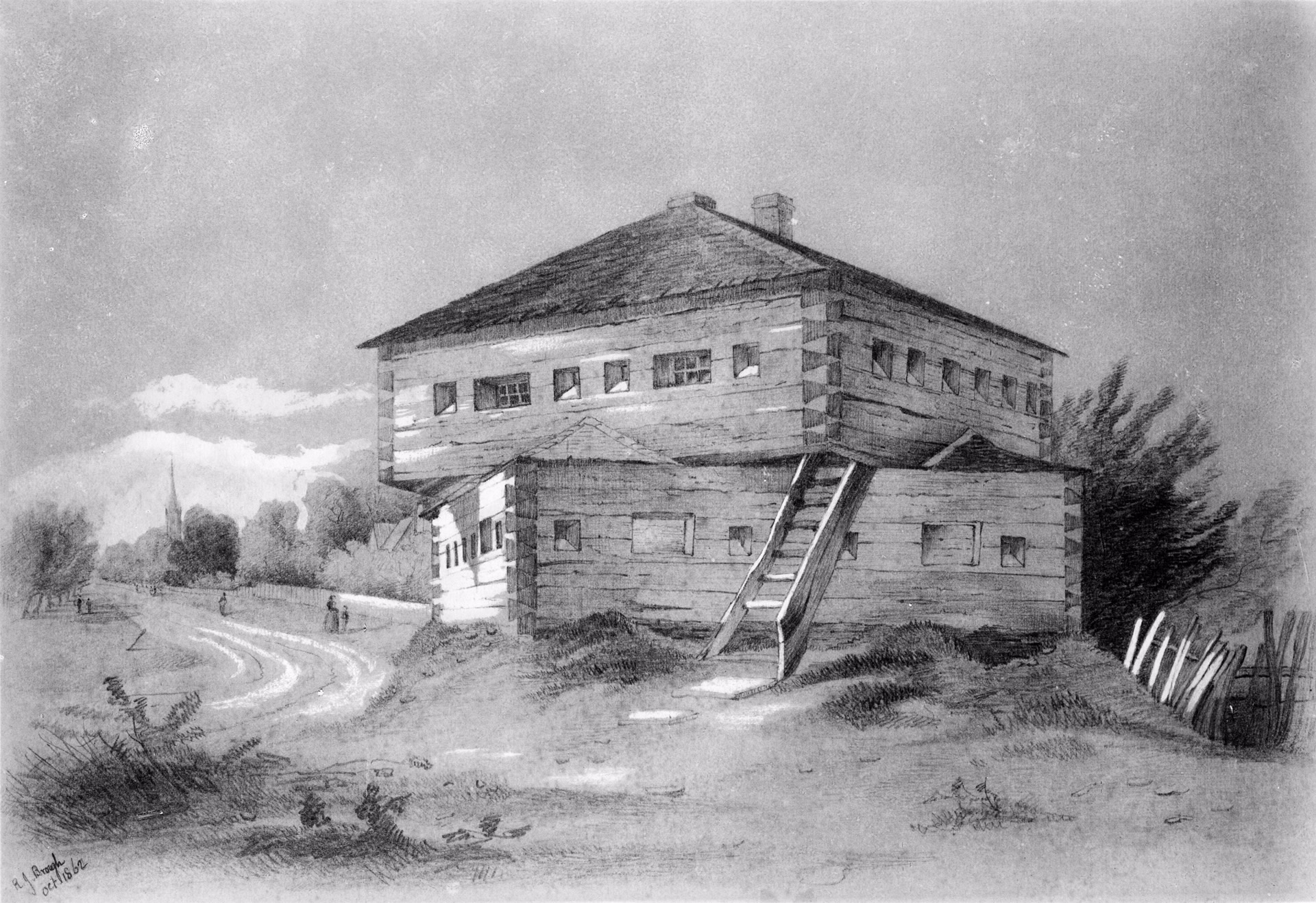
The Sherbourne Blockhouse off Bloor and Sherbourne Street, 1862. Fort York, and several blockhouses in the city's periphery defended the approaches into Toronto.

In addition to Fort York, the British erected several other fortifications and artillery batteries to defend the community. However, except Fort York and New Fort York's officers' quarters, all of these structures were demolished by the mid-20th century. Before the Battle of York in 1813, the settlement was defended by Fort York and three other blockhouses, two blockhouses at Gibraltar Point, and one in the town around King and Parliament Street. In addition to these blockhouses, the town was also defended by two artillery batteries west of the fort, the Western Battery, and the Half-Moon Battery. Most of the original fort, in addition to the three blockhouses around the settlement were destroyed by American forces following the Battle of York.

After the Battle of York, the fort was rebuilt, and three blockhouses were erected around the settlement; one at Gibraltar Point, another built next to the Western Battery, and the third blockhouse was built around Queen Street, defending the inland western approach into the town. The blockhouse on Queen Street was dismantled in 1818, whereas the other two were left "in ruins" by the mid-1820s. Following the rebellions in 1837–38, three more blockhouses were erected in the periphery of Toronto; one around College Street and Spadina Avenue, another blockhouse on Sherbourne Street, and a third along Yonge Street. In 1841, New Fort York was completed along the shoreline west of Fort York. The three blockhouses were dismantled and removed by the mid-19th century. Conversely, New Fort York remained in use by the military until the end of the Second World War. The majority of the New Fort York was demolished in 1951, although the new fort's officers' quarters still stand.

== See also ==
- Fort Douville
- Fort Rouillé
- Fort Toronto
- List of forts
- List of oldest buildings and structures in Toronto
- List of museums in Toronto
