= Gibraltar Point =

Gibraltar Point may refer to:

- Gibraltar Point, Lincolnshire, a national nature reserve located in England
- Gibraltar Point Lighthouse, a lighthouse located in Toronto, Canada
- Gibraltar Point Blockhouse, a blockhouse located in Toronto, Canada
- Europa Point, the southernmost point of Gibraltar
