= Garrison Crossing =

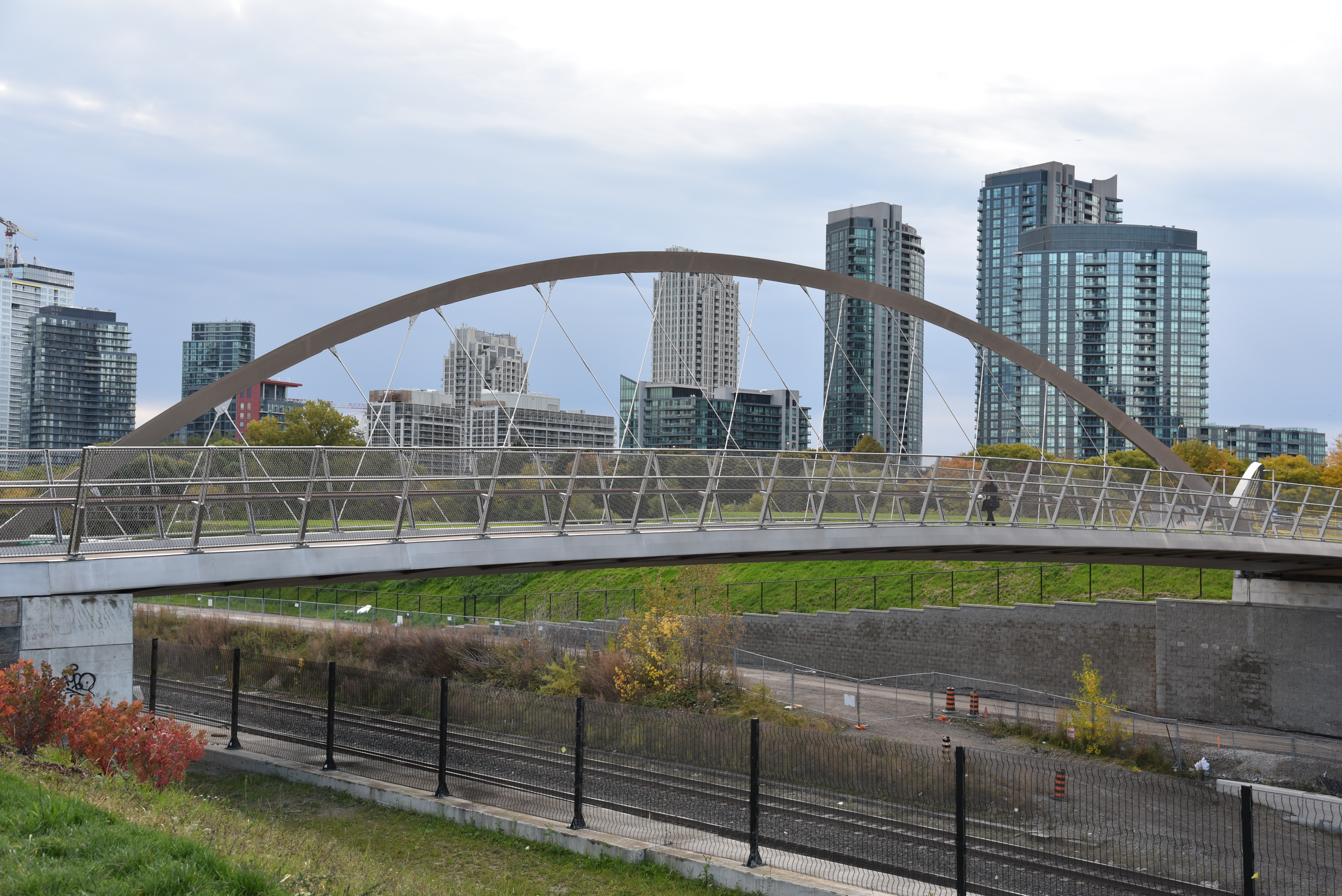
- Coordinates: 43.638928°N 79.407793°W
- Carries: Pedestrian and bicycles
- Crosses: Railway corridors
- Locale: Toronto, Ontario, Canada
- Other name(s): Fort York Pedestrian and Cycle Bridge
- Owner: City of Toronto
- Maintained by: City of Toronto

Characteristics
- Design: arch bridge
- Material: Stainless steel
- Total length: 52 m
- Width: 5 m
- Longest span: 52 m
- No. of spans: 3

History
- Architect: DTAH
- Designer: Pedelta Structural Engineers
- Engineering design by: Juan Sobrino
- Constructed by: Dufferin Construction
- Fabrication by: Mariani Metal
- Opened: October 1st, 2019

Location
- Location on a map of Toronto

The Garrison Crossing (formerly named Fort York Pedestrian and Cycle Bridge), located in downtown Toronto, provides a link between Stanley Park in the north and the Garrison Common of the Fort York grounds in the south. The crossing includes two stainless steel bridges over rail corridors. The bridges form an important pedestrian and cyclist link to the Waterfront that also connects three parks - Ordnance Park, South Stanley Park with the Fort York neighbourhood.

== History ==
The project was first initiated in the early 2000s and was canceled for cost reasons. In 2014, the council approved the project procured as a Design-Build project directed by CreateTO, the City of Toronto's real estate and development corporation, with a budget of $19.7-million. The project was awarded to Dufferin Construction with a stainless-steel bridge project, the first of its kind in Canada. The project was completed in October 2019.

== Design ==
The two bridges are constructed of a single stainless-steel arch rib of triangular shape utilizing standard hot-rolled stainless-steel plates that suspend the deck by a network arrangement of stainless-steel hangers. The arch ribs are titled outwards in opposite direction. The deck is a trapezoidal stainless-steel box girder with ribs on one side. The steel box is connected to a top concrete slab that uses stainless-steel reinforcement.

The north bridge is a 52 m long through arch bridge, while the south bridge is a one-span arch connected to a V-shape pier on the south end to accommodate the 5 m elevation difference between the two ends. The South Bridge landing includes a 58 m long structural concrete ramp on the west side terminating in a cantilevered lookout on the east side.

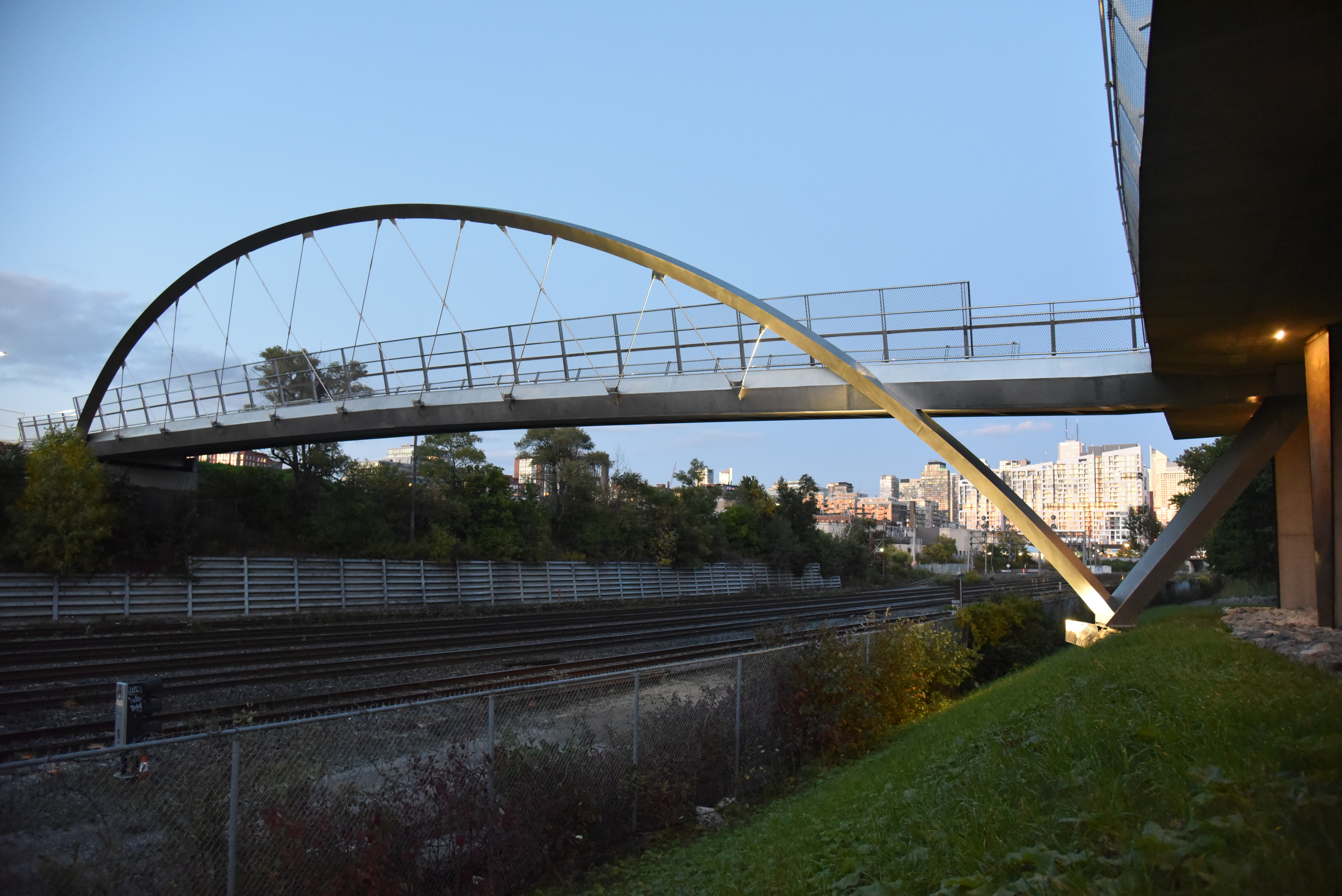
view of the South Bridge looking north (October 2019)

== Construction ==
Construction started in August 2016. The two bridge structures were hoisted into place by a 660-ton crawler crane in the summer and fall of 2018 and were completed in October 2019.

== Awards ==
2019 Award of excellence - Bridge category. Ontario Steel Design Awards. Canadian Institute of Steel Construction.

2020 Award of design excellence. Association of Canadian Consulting Engineers.
