= James Cooper House =

Coordinates: 43.670851°N 79.376708°W

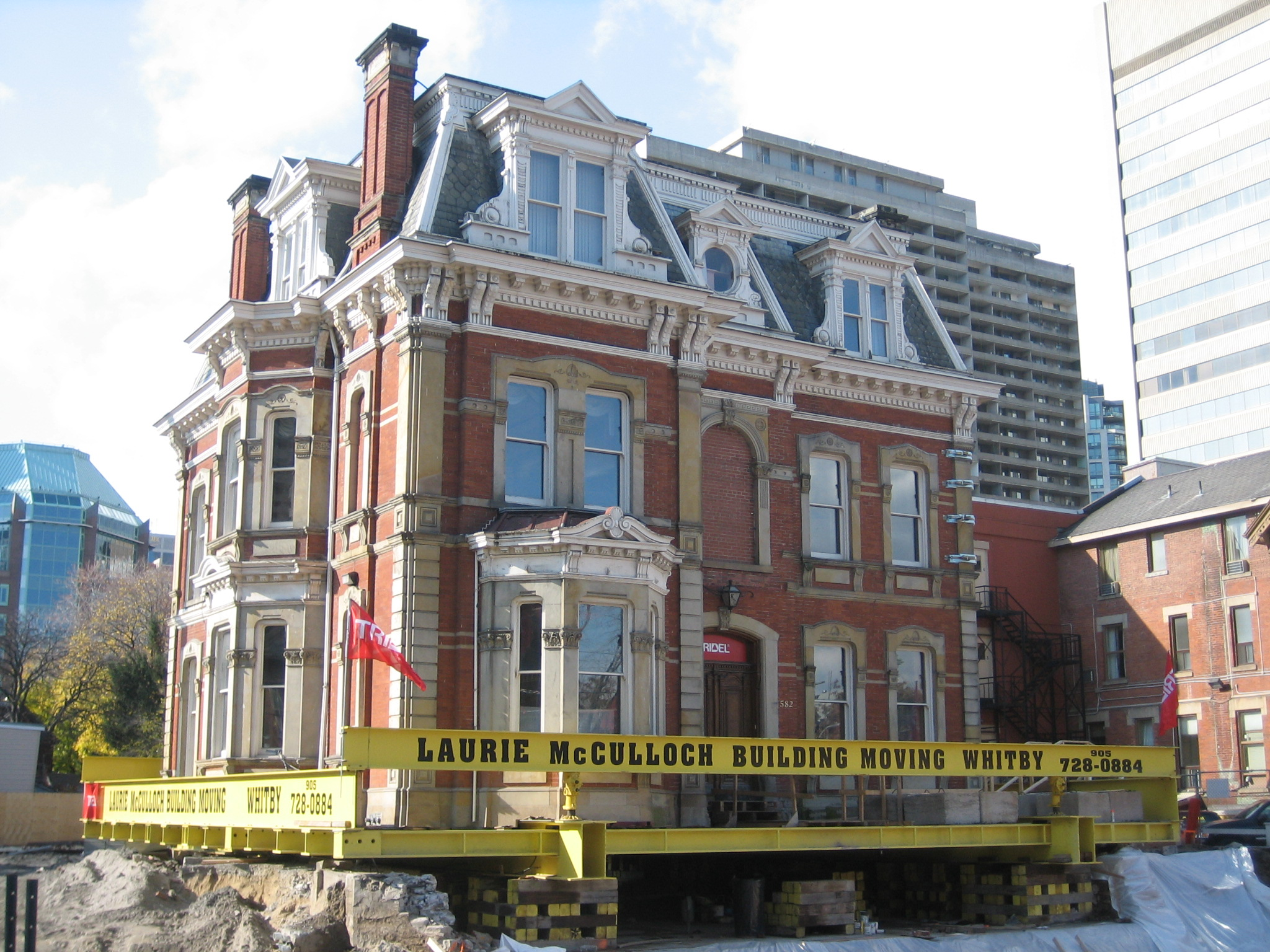
The house in November 2008 after its initial move

James Cooper House is an historic house in Toronto, Ontario, Canada. In 2008, the house became the heaviest residential structural relocation in Canadian history, when it was moved 20 feet (6.1 m) east and 5 feet (1.5 m) south from its original location. The relocation took place over two phases, moving east on September 25, 2008 and south on December 11, 2008, at a reported cost of CA$1 million.

The house is located at the corner of Sherbourne Street and Linden, just south of Bloor Street. It was built in 1881 for James Cooper, a wealthy importer, manufacturer, and retailer of shoes. It was one of many mansions in the Sherbourne and Jarvis area, once among Toronto's wealthiest. The eight bedroom house was opulently constructed in the Second Empire style with Classical detailing. The City of Toronto designated the structure a heritage property and affixed a Heritage Toronto plaque in 2010. After Cooper departed, the building became home to the Keeley Institute for Nervous Diseases, an organization assisting those with alcohol and substance abuse problems. In 1910, it became home to the Toronto Knights of Columbus, who used the facility as a meeting and fundraising venue for almost a century and added the assembly hall seen in the black and white photograph from 1956.

Tridel development corporation purchased the building and its large lot in 2005, intending to erect a condominium tower on the site. The building would be preserved, but moved to a part of the lot about 60 feet away from its original location. The assembly hall addition would be demolished. This process began in 2008 when crews lifted the 800-ton house off its foundation and moved it to a temporary spot during construction. Tridel's new 32 storey tower is named "James Cooper Mansion," and the old house will serve as an amenities centre for the new building.
