= Sherbourne Street, Toronto =

Thoroughfare in Toronto, Ontario

Sherbourne Street
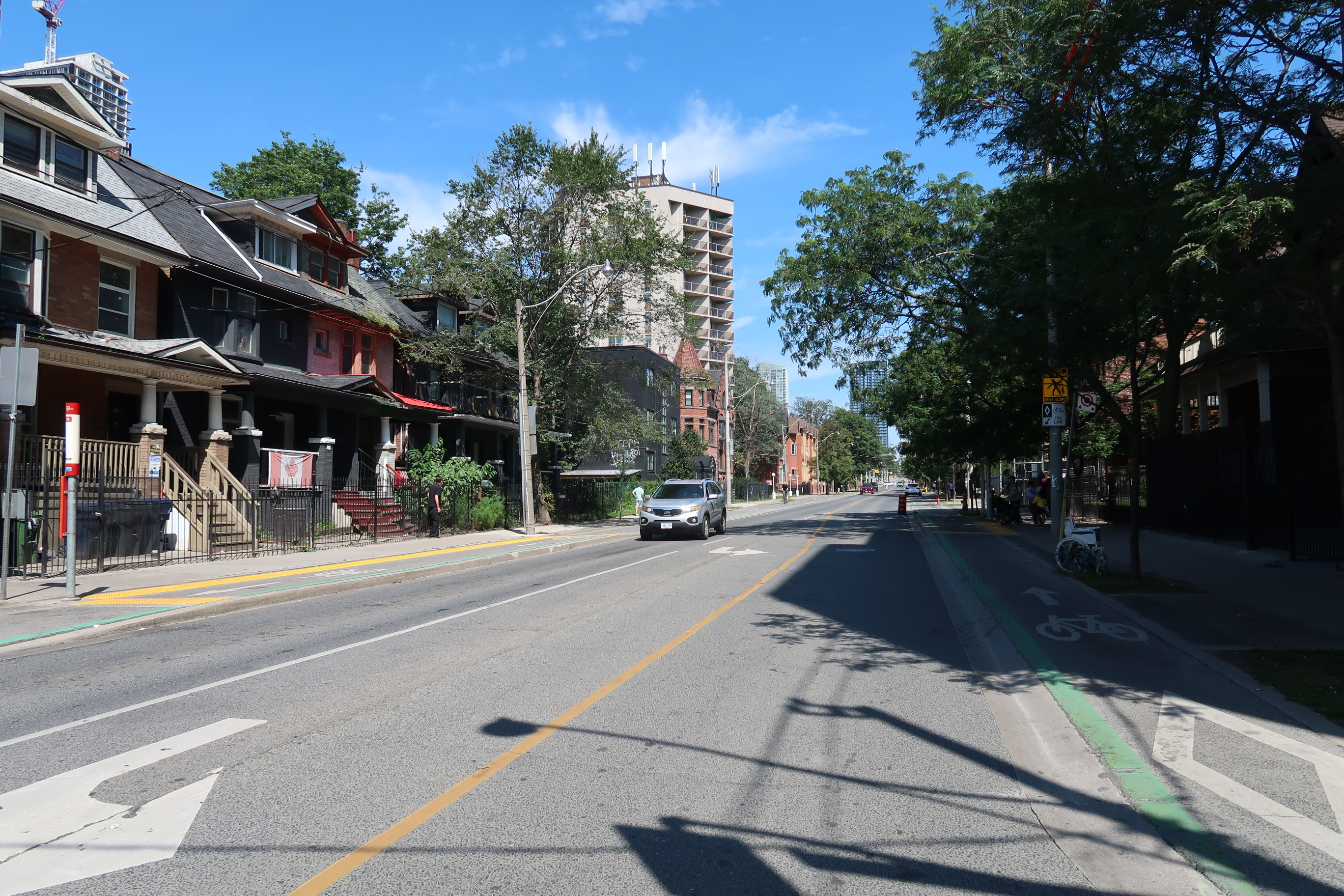
- Sherbourne Street in Cabbagetown South (2023)

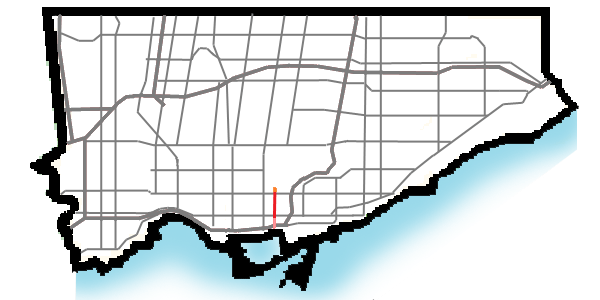
- Sherbourne Street North is orange; Lower Sherbourne Street is pink; Sherbourne Street is red
- Maintained by: City of Toronto government
- Length: 3.65 km (2.27 mi)
- Location: Toronto
- South end: Queens Quay
- Major junctions: King Street; Queen Street; Bloor Street
- North end: South Drive

Other
Nearby arterial roads in Toronto
← Jarvis Street	Parliament Street →

Sherbourne Street is a roadway in Downtown Toronto. It is one of the original streets in the old city of York, Upper Canada. It starts at Queens Quay and heads north to South Drive. It is two lanes for its entire length though the part south of Bloor Street has bike lanes.

It was named by Samuel Smith Ridout (son of Thomas Ridout) in 1845 after the town in Dorset, England; the Ridout family emigrated from Sherborne to Maryland in 1774. Before 1845 the short stretch from Palace Street (now Front Street East) to Duchess Street (now Richmond Street) was called Caroline Street.

== History ==
In 1838, following the Upper Canada Rebellion, seven blockhouses were built, guarding the approaches to Toronto, including the Sherbourne Blockhouse, built at the current intersection of Sherbourne and Bloor.

In the 19th century, Sherbourne was lined with the stately homes of many of Toronto's most prominent families, but by the 20th century, the remaining stately houses like 230 Sherbourne Street had been converted to rooming houses.

Streetcars ran down Sherbourne from 1874 (as horsecar service until electrified in 1891, then as Belt Line to 1923, and finally as Sherbourne streetcar line) to 1942. Buses did not begin on Sherbourne until 1947 and is now signed as 75 Sherbourne since 1957.

In the early 2000s, City Council chose Sherbourne as one of the first streets in Toronto to be retrofitted with dedicated bike lanes. In 2012, Sherbourne's bike lanes were improved, changing them from lanes separated from cars and trucks solely by painted lines to lanes with a pavement change that would warn motorists when they had strayed out of their lanes.

== Landmarks ==
Landmark	Cross street	Notes	Image
Rosedale Ravine			
Sherbourne Subway Station	Bloor Street		
Trinity Evangelical Lutheran Church			
James Cooper House	Linden Street		
Our Lady of Lourdes Church	Earl Street		
Phoenix Concert Theatre			
St. James Town Branch of the Toronto Public Library	Wellesley Street		
Saint Luke's United Church	Carlton Street		
Allan Gardens	between Gerrard Street East and Carlton Street		
Allandale House	Dundas Street East		
Moss Park	between Queen Street East and Shuter Street		
Paul Bishop Houses	Adelaide Street East		
National Hotel	King Street East		
Sherbourne Common	Queens Quay		
