= Gibraltar Point Blockhouse =

Coordinates: 43.627774°N 79.389535°W

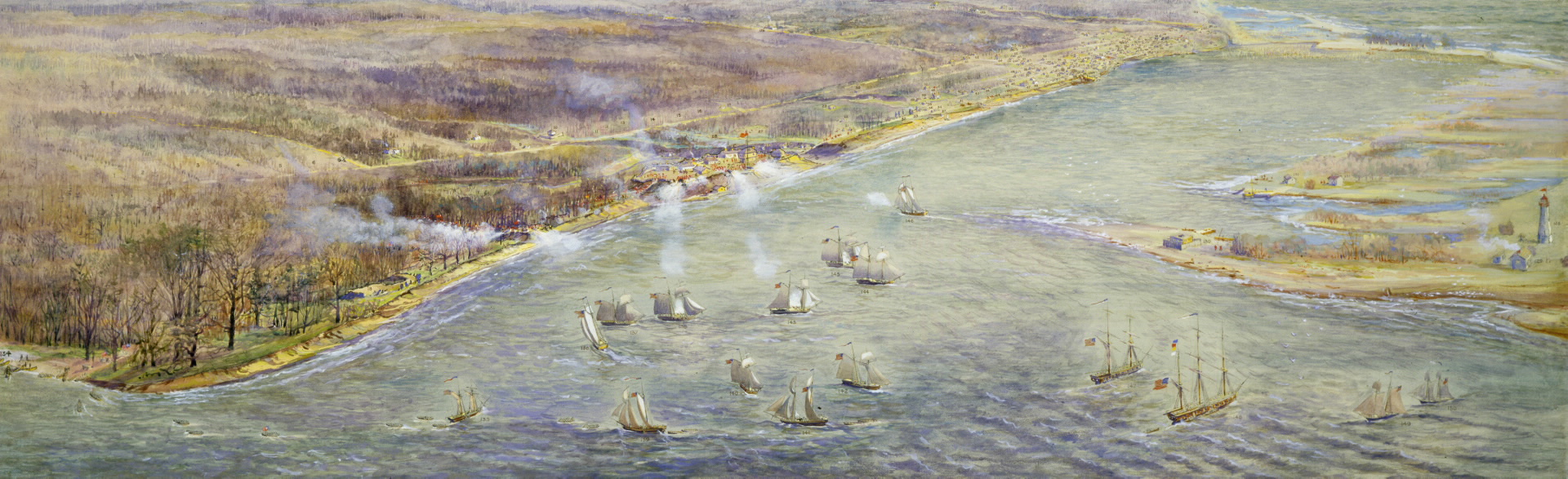
The Battle of York during the War of 1812, with the Gibraltar Point Blockhouse visible on the right

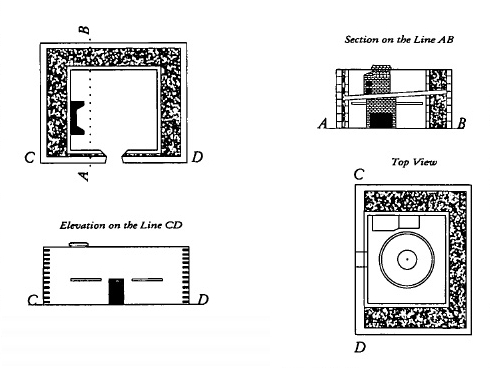
Gibraltar Point Blockhouse diagrams

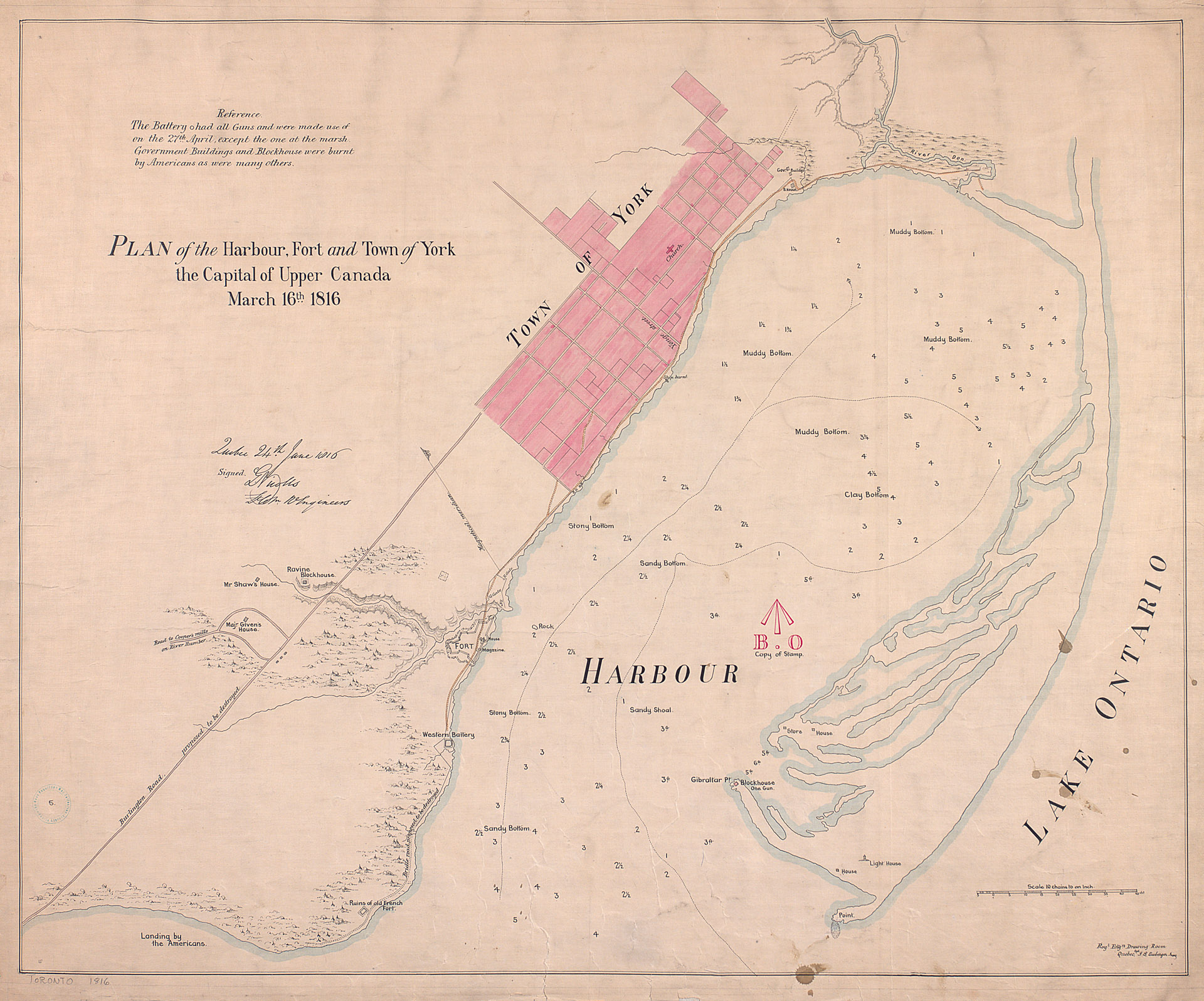
Map of the harbour in 1816, with the Gibraltar Point Blockhouse shown on the lower right

The Gibraltar Point Blockhouse was a blockhouse that was originally built in 1794 and was located on Gibraltar Point at the western end of the Toronto Islands. The first Lieutenant Governor of Upper Canada, John Graves Simcoe, planned defences for the mouth of Toronto Harbour at Fort York, along with the Gibraltar Point Blockhouse that was situated south of the harbour's entrance.

In 1800, a storehouse and guardhouse were added, but the battery was destroyed in 1813 and rebuilt as a blockhouse in 1814. The blockhouse was two storeys tall, with the upper platform having no roof and with its floor consumed with a traversing carriage for a single cannon.

An oven permitted supplying the cannon with "hot shot"—cannonballs heated so they could start fires on the highly-flammable ships of the era. The lower floor could barrack thirty staff. The blockhouse's walls were formed from two parallel wooden walls, with the gap in between filled with tightly packed earth.

The blockhouse played no active part in the defence of York, when it was captured during the War of 1812. Most of the buildings on the Toronto Islands were destroyed by American forces at that time, excluding the Gibraltar Point Lighthouse.

During peacetime, the barracks at the Gibraltar Point Blockhouse were used to quarantine seriously ill individuals. The blockhouse was in ruins by 1823 and removed by 1833.
