= Sherbourne Blockhouse =

Coordinates: 43.67239°N 79.37683°W

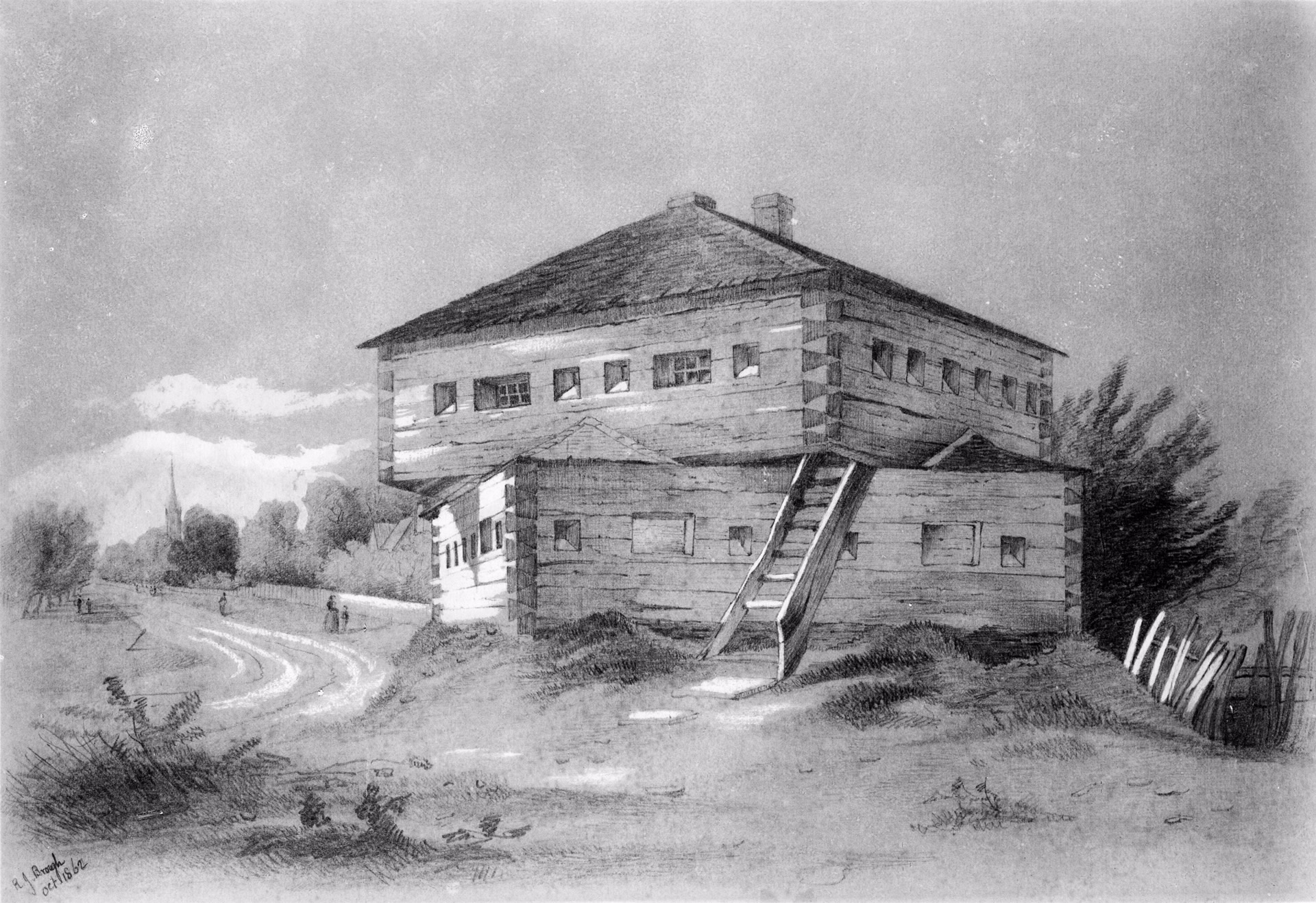
Toronto's abandoned Sherbourne Blockhouse in 1862.

Following the Upper Canada Rebellion of 1837 Lieutenant Governor of Upper Canada Sir George Arthur directed the construction of a Sherbourne Blockhouse, and a ring of six other blockhouses -- to guard the approaches to Toronto in case there was another rebellion. The Sherbourne Blockhouse was located at the northern end of Sherbourne Street, at the current intersection with Bloor, just south of the Rosedale Ravine.

The blockhouses were two stories tall, and designed to accommodate up to 44 soldiers. The two stories were at 45 degrees to one another—a design intended to make it easier to observe in all directions.

Construction of the blockhouses was budgeted at 330 British Pounds. They were completed in 1838. By 1850 they were staffed by a skeleton crew of former soldiers, who served as caretakers. The Spadina Blockhouse was demolished sometime before 1854. The Yonge Blockhouse was demolished in 1865. The Sherbourne Blockhouse was demolished in 1875. Numerous sketches of it have survived to the current day.
