= Name of Toronto =

Name of Canada's largest city, used for other, sometimes distant places in the past

The name of Toronto has a history distinct from that of the city itself. Originally, the term "Tkaronto" referred to a channel of water between Lake Simcoe and Lake Couchiching, at what is now the city of Orillia, on maps as early as 1675 but in time the name passed southward, and was eventually applied to a new fort at the mouth of the Humber River. Fort Toronto was the first European settlement in the area, and lent its name to what became the city of Toronto.

John Graves Simcoe identified the area as a strategic location to base a new capital for Upper Canada, believing Newark to be susceptible to American invasion. A garrison was established at Garrison Creek, on the western entrance to the docks of Toronto Harbour, in 1793; this later became Fort York. The settlement it defended was renamed "York" on August 26, 1793, as Simcoe favoured English names over those of First Nations languages, in honour of Prince Frederick, Duke of York. Residents petitioned to change the name back to "Toronto", and in 1834, the city was incorporated with its original name. The name "York" lived on through the name of York County (which was later split into Metropolitan Toronto and York Region), and continues to live on through the names of several districts within the city, including Yorkville, East York, North York, and York, the last three being suburbs that were formally amalgamated into the "megacity" of Toronto on January 1, 1998.

== History ==
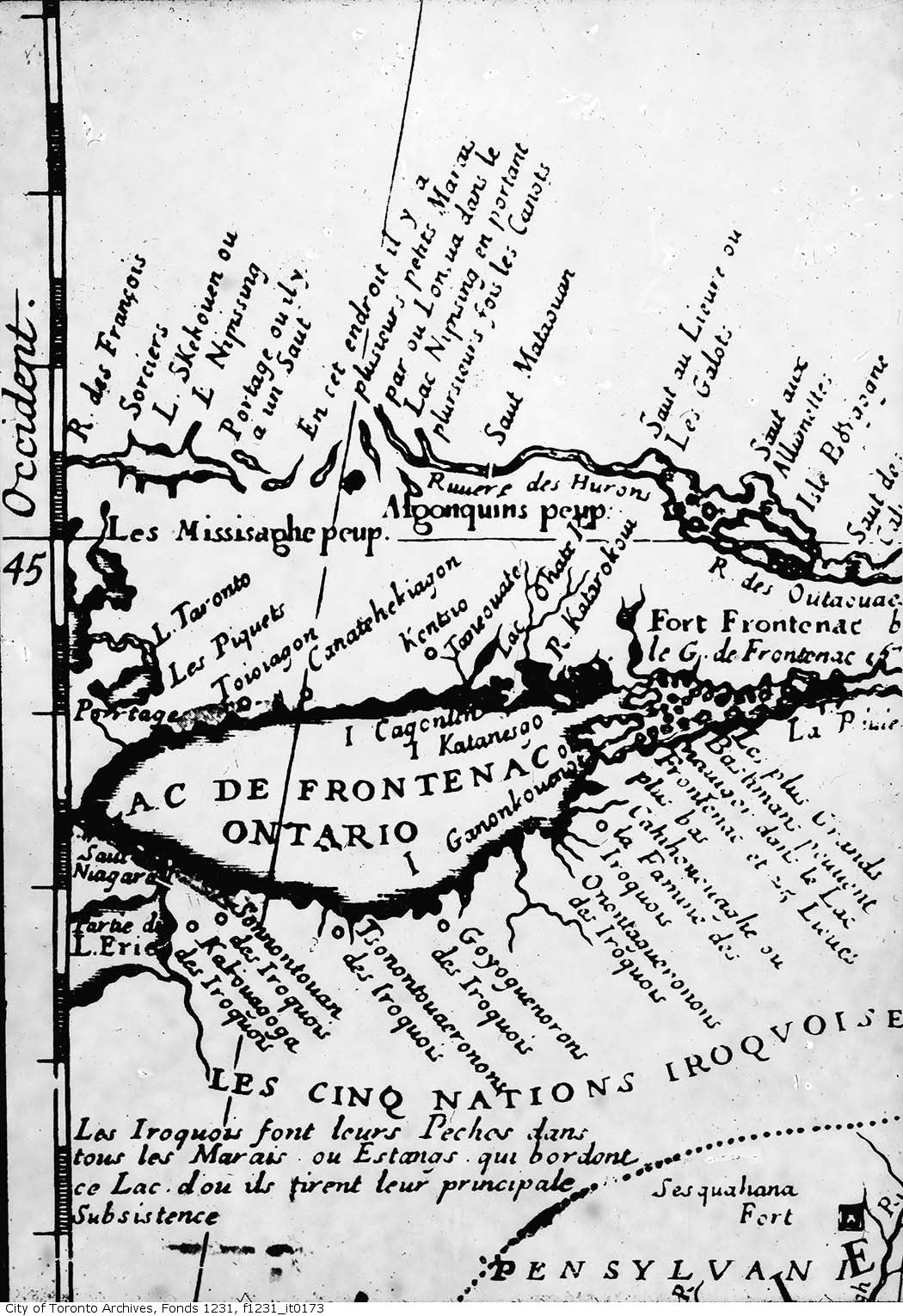
An early map depicting Teiaiagon and Lac Taronto, which would be renamed Lake Simcoe. The Toronto Carrying-Place Trail is shown, simply marked as Portage, and Lake Ontario was then known as Lac de Frontenac.

The word Toronto was recorded with various spellings in French and English, including Tarento, Tarontha, Taronto, Toranto, Torento, Toronto, and Toronton. The most frequent early spelling, Taronto, referred to "The Narrows", a channel of water through which Lake Simcoe discharges into Lake Couchiching at what is now the city of Orillia. This narrows was called "Tkaronto" by the Mohawk, meaning "where there are trees standing in the water", and was recorded as early as 1615 by Samuel de Champlain. Today, the area is partially surrounded by trees along the water's edge with the rest with marinas and location of the historic Mnjikaning Fish Weirs.

Prior to the Iroquois inhabitation of the Toronto region, the Wyandot (Huron) people inhabited the region, later moving north to the area around Lake Huron and Georgian Bay. The word Toronto, meaning "plenty", appeared in a French lexicon of the Wyandot language in 1632. Toronto, however, did not appear on any map of the region before 1650. After 1650, and the destruction of Fort Sainte Marie, the Hurons left the region.

A 1675 map in French, by Pierre Raffeix, referred to Lake Simcoe as Lac Taronto, and the name Tarontos Lac appeared on a 1678 map of New France by cartographer Jean-Baptiste-Louis Franquelin. In 1680, it appeared as Lac de Taronto on a map created by French court official Abbé Claude Bernou.

By 1686, Passage de Taronto referred to a canoe route tracking what is now the Humber River. The river became known as Rivière Taronto as the canoe route became more popular with French explorers, and by the 1750s, a fort to the east of the delta on Lake Ontario was named Fort Toronto by the French. Rivière Taronto was renamed to Humber River by Simcoe. The change of spelling from Taronto to Toronto is thought to originate on a 1695 map by Italian cartographer Vincenzo Coronelli.

During his travels in Upper Canada in 1796, Isaac Weld wrote about Simcoe's policy of assigning English names to locations in Upper Canada. He opposed the renaming scheme, stating:

It is to be lamented that the Indian names, so grand and sonorous, should ever have been changed for others. Newark, Kingston, York are poor substitutes for the original names of the respective places Niagara, Cataraqui, Toronto.

— Isaac Weld

The name has also sometimes been identified with Tarantou, a village marked on a 1656 map of New France by Nicolas Sanson. However, the location on this map is east of Lake Nipissing and northwest of Montreal in what is now Quebec.

=== Town of York ===
In 1786, Lord Dorchester arrived in Quebec City as Governor-in-Chief of British North America. His mission was to solve the problems of the newly landed Loyalists. At first, Dorchester suggested opening the new Canada West as districts under the Quebec government, but the British Government made known its intention to split Canada into Upper and Lower Canada. Dorchester began organizing for the new province of Upper Canada, including a capital. Dorchester's first choice was Kingston, but he was aware of the number of Loyalists in the Bay of Quinte and Niagara areas, and he chose instead the location north of the Bay of Toronto, midway between the settlements and 30 miles (48 km) from the US. Under the policy of the time, the British recognized aboriginal title to the land and Dorchester arranged to purchase the land from the Mississaugas.

Dorchester intended for the location of the new capital to be named Toronto. Instead, Lieutenant Governor Simcoe ordered the name of the new settlement to be called York, after the Duke of York, who had guided a recent British victory in Holland. Simcoe is recorded as both disliking aboriginal names and disliking Dorchester. The new capital was named York on August 27, 1793. In 1804, settler Angus MacDonald petitioned the Upper Canada Legislature to restore the name Toronto, but this was rejected. To differentiate it from York in England and New York City, the town was known as Little York.

=== Adoption of the name Toronto ===
In 1834, the Legislative Council sought to incorporate the city, then still known as "York". By this time, it was already the largest city in Upper Canada, growing greatly in the late 1820s and early 1830s following the slow growth from its founding in the 1790s. The Council was petitioned to rename the city "Toronto" during its incorporation, and on March 1, 1834, debated the issue. In Debate on Name Toronto in Incorporation Act, March 1, 1834, records indicate various council members noting their support for or opposition to the measure. The most vocal opponents were John Willson, and Mr. Jarvis and Mr. Bidwell. Proponents were William Chisholm, William Bent Berczy, and Mr. Clark. The Speaker noted that "this city will be the only City of Toronto in the world", to cheers from council.

The name was chosen in part to avoid the negative connotations that York had engendered in the city's residents, especially that of dirty Little York. Toronto was also considered more pleasing, as the speaker noted during the debate, "He hoped Honourable Members had the same taste for musical sounds as he had". Berczy noted that "it is the old, original name of the place, and the sound is in every respect much better". Some sources also indicate that the name Taronto and its variants was so common on maps, that it made sense to use this word. The City of Toronto was incorporated on March 6, 1834.

=== Tkaronto ===
Tkaronto reemerged as an alternate name for the city in 2020. The reemergence was attributed to an "Indigenous awakening", that aimed to honour the city's Indigenous history and to decolonize the city's name.

== Nicknames ==
Depiction of York, Upper Canada in 1803. During this period the settlement was referred to as Little York, in comparison to York in England and New York City in the US

Toronto has had various nicknames throughout its history. Among the earliest of these was the disparaging Muddy York, used during the settlement's early growth. At the time, there were no sewers or storm drains, and the streets were unpaved. During rainfall, water would accumulate on the dirt roads, transforming them into often impassable muddy avenues. A more disparaging nickname used by the early residents was Little York, referring to its establishment as a collection of twelve log homes at the mouth of the Don River surrounded by wilderness, and used in comparison to New York City in the United States and York in England. This changed as new settlements and roads were established, extending from the newly established capital. Adjectives were sometimes attached to Little York; records from the Legislative Council of the time indicate that "dirty Little York" and "nasty Little York" were used by residents.

Among the newest nicknames as of 2024 is the Six, also written as the 6 or the 6ix. This was popularized in 2015 by Toronto-born musician Drake with his mixtape If You're Reading This It's Too Late and 2016 album Views. Drake himself credits Toronto rapper Jimmy Prime with inventing the term but it was used by other Toronto rappers in the early 2000s, in songs such as Baby Blue Soundcrew's "Love 'Em All". The usage of the nickname in many of Drake's songs has since brought it to global attention. Etymologically, while the meaning of the term was initially unclear, Drake clarified in a 2016 interview by Jimmy Fallon on The Tonight Show that it derived from the shared digits of the 416 and 647 telephone area codes and the six municipalities that were amalgamated into the current City of Toronto in 1998.

It has since influenced numerous works within the Canadian Hip Hop community, including the formation of 6ixBuzz and the release of the documentary 6IX RISING. The name has also been noted for having transcended the hip hop community, crossing into mainstream usage by March 2016; having been adopted by the media at a level unseen by Toronto's other hip hop-based nicknames like T-dot. The adoption of the nickname by some media outlets has been named as a contributing factor for its entry into the public's consciousness. Culture critics note the nomenclature is an example of an organically grown "city brand", having originated from the hip hop community as opposed to Toronto City Hall, or an advertising agency. In 2020, the moniker was adopted as the name for the Toronto-based Premier Hockey Federation team, the Toronto Six, after it received more votes than any other name on an online poll.

In his book Naming Canada: Stories about Canadian Place Names, Alan Rayburn states that "no place in Canada has as many sobriquets as Toronto". Among them are the nicknames:

- "Broadway North", in reference to the Broadway theatre area in Manhattan. Toronto is home to the world's third largest English-speaking theatre district after London and New York City.
- "Centre of the Universe", as mentioned in the documentary film Let's All Hate Toronto, as the term is used derisively by residents of the rest of Canada in reference to the city. It is also infrequently used by the media. The moniker "Center of the Universe" was originally a popular nickname for New York City, and more specifically Times Square in Midtown Manhattan. It has since been used to refer to other cities.
- "City of Churches".

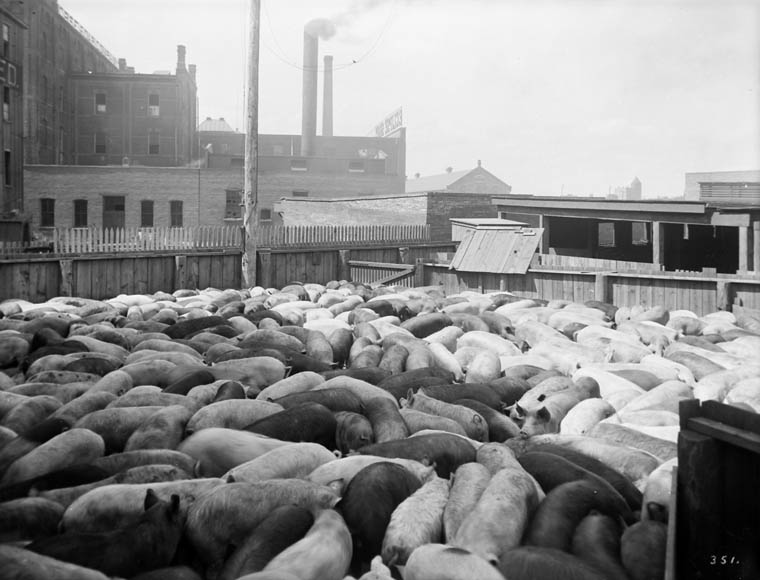
A hog pen at the William Davies Company facilities in Toronto, c. 1920s. The city may have earned the Hogtown moniker due to the amount of pork processed in the city in the early 20th century.

- "Hogtown", said to be related to the livestock that was processed in Toronto, largely by the city's largest pork processor and packer, the William Davies Company. However, the name may also be derived from the Anglo-Saxon word for York, Eoforwic, which literally translates to 'wild boar village'; or a by-law which imposed a 10-cent-per-pig fine on anyone allowing pigs to run in the street.
- "Hollywood North", referring to the film industry.
- "Queen City", a reference now most commonly used by French Canadians (La Ville-Reine) or speakers of Quebec English, other French-language or Franco-Ontarian newsmedia such as Le Droit or in advertising. The second part of the three-part Toronto: City of Dreams documentary about the city was titled The Queen City (1867–1939).
- "The 416", referring to the original telephone area code for much of the city (the other area codes are 647 and 437); the surrounding GTA suburbs, now using area codes 905, 289, and 365, are similarly "the 905".
- "The Big Smoke", used by Allan Fotheringham, a writer for Maclean's magazine, who had first heard the term applied by Aboriginal Australians to Australian cities. The Big Smoke was originally a popular nickname for London, England, and is now used to refer to various cities throughout the world.
- "The City That Works", first mentioned in a Harper's Magazine article written by The Washington Post correspondent Anthony Astrachan in 1975. It refers to the city's reputation for successful urban planning.
- "The Megacity", referring to the amalgamation of the former Metropolitan Toronto.

The seal of the former Metropolitan Toronto, containing six loops representing the six municipalities that formed it; a partial inspiration for the moniker The 6ix

- "TO" or "T.O.", from Toronto, Ontario, or from Toronto; pronounced "Tee-Oh". The variation of the moniker, "T-dot", is a hip hop-based nickname, used in music by local artists like Kardinal Offishall.
- "Toronto the Good", from its history as a bastion of 19th century Victorian morality and coined by mayor William Holmes Howland. An 1898 book by C.S. Clark was titled Of Toronto the Good. A Social Study. The Queen City of Canada As It Is. The book is a facsimile of an 1898 edition. Today sometimes used ironically to imply a less-than-great or less-than-moral status.
- "YYZ", the IATA airport code for Toronto Pearson International Airport (the primary international airport serving Toronto) that inspired the name of an instrumental song by Canadian rock band Rush.

== Works cited ==
- Benson, Denise. "Putting T-Dot on the Map". Eye Weekly. Archived from the original on July 10, 2011.
- Bly, Laura (September 4, 2009). "Toronto rolls out the red carpet for celebs and U.S. tourists". USA Today.
- Cerny, Dory (April 2009). "Earthgirl". Book reviews. Quill & Quire.
- Clark, C.S. (1970). Of Toronto the Good. A Social Study. The Queen City of Canada as it is. ISBN 978-0-665-00659-3. Archived from the original on July 2, 2008.
- Court, Paul. "How Toronto Got Its Names". United States Institute for Theatre Technology, Inc. Archived from the original on June 4, 2012.
- Davidson, Hilary (2007). Frommer's Toronto 2007 (13 ed.). John Wiley and Sons. ISBN 978-0-470-04852-8.
- Donald, Betsy (May 16, 2002). "Spinning Toronto's golden age: the making of a 'city that worked'". Environment and Planning A. 34 (12): 2127–2154. doi:10.1068/a34111. ISSN 1472-3409. S2CID 144382436.
- Filey, Mark (February 17, 2010). "The rise of the Big Smoke". Toronto Sun.
- Firth, Edith G., ed. (1966). The Town of York: 1815—1834; A Further Collection of Documents of Early Toronto. University of Toronto Press.
- Gerard, Warren (2004). "Chronicling a City's Past". Imperial Oil Review. 88 (450). Archived from the original on December 17, 2004.
- Guillet, Edwin C. (1969) [1933]. Pioneer Settlements in Upper Canada. University of Toronto Press. ISBN 978-0802061102.
- Hare, P.J. "Toronto Pork Packing Plant". Toronto Green Community.
- Hayes, Derek (2002). Historical Atlas of Canada: Canada's History Illustrated with Original Maps. Douglas & McIntyre, University of Washington Press. ISBN 978-0-295-98277-9.
- Hoang, Na. "Women in Toronto the happiest in Canada?". Canwest News Service.
- Hounsom, Eric Wilfird (1970). Toronto in 1810. Toronto: Ryerson Press. ISBN 978-0-7700-0311-1.
- Hume, Christopher (October 24, 2009). "A brilliant beauty built to last". Toronto Star. Archived from the original on October 27, 2009.
- Kuitenbrouwer, Peter (February 18, 2010). "Toronto is Hollywood North again". National Post.
- Low, A. Ritchie (April 20, 1948). "How Good is 'Toronto the Good'?". Baltimore Afro-American. p. M-6.
- Maloney, Mark (January 3, 2010). "Toronto's mayors: Scoundrels, rogues and socialists". Toronto Star. Archived from the original on January 6, 2010.
- Mendelson, Rachel (December 12, 2013). "Deputy Mayor Norm Kelly says calm has returned to city hall". Toronto Star. Archived from the original on December 14, 2013.
- McCarthy, Pearl (March 5, 1954). "Tarantou, Now Toronto, First Mapped in 1656". The Globe and Mail. Toronto.
- Mulvany, Charles Pelham (1884). Toronto: past and present: A handbook of the city. W. E. Caiger.
- Rayburn, Alan (2001). Naming Canada: Stories about Canadian Place Names. Toronto: University of Toronto Press. ISBN 978-0-8020-8293-0.
- Ruppert, Evelyn Sharon (2006). The moral economy of cities: shaping good citizens. University of Toronto Press. ISBN 978-0-8020-3886-9.
- Seputis, Jasmin (October 14, 2018). "'Tarontos Lac': Geographer finds oldest known reference to Toronto on 340-year-old French map".
- Tossell, Ivor (January 30, 2009). "Open-source politics breathe fresh air into the Big Smoke". The Globe and Mail.
- "Why, Toronto, you don't look a day over 174..." CBC News. March 6, 2009.
- "Introduction to Toronto". Frommer's. Wiley Publishing.
- "London trumps Toronto as centre of Facebook universe". The Globe and Mail. July 23, 2007.
- "Toronto: History". Lonely Planet Publications.
- "The real story of how Toronto got its name". Natural Resources Canada. Archived from the original on November 9, 2013.
- "Canada, Provinces & Territories: The naming of their capital cities". Natural Resources Canada. Archived from the original on December 11, 2011.
- "Perly's Toronto Megacity Mapbook". Archived from the original on January 16, 2008.
- "Origin of the name of Toronto". City of Toronto. Archived from the original on July 28, 2014.
- "Toronto competes". City of Toronto. Archived from the original on January 27, 2007.
- "Entertainment and Tourism". Toronto facts. City of Toronto. November 14, 2017.
- "Let's All Hate Toronto". The Lens. CBC Newsworld.
- Urban Decoder (November 1, 2003). "Toronto is often described as la Ville-Reine (the Queen City) by announcers on Radio-Canada". Toronto Life.
- "Toronto region". Via Rail.
- "Part Two: Queen City (1867 - 1939)". Toronto: City of Dreams. White Pine Pictures (at Collections Canada).
- "We The 6: Why the name Drake gave us is here to stay". The Globe and Mail.
