= Fort Rouillé =

Abandoned French fort in Canada

- Toronto, Ontario, Canada
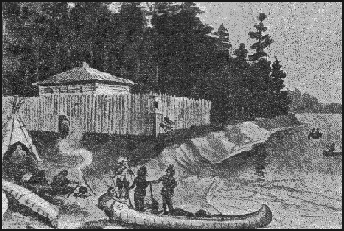
- Artistic depiction of Fort Rouillé, c. 1750s

Site information
- Type: Trading post

Location
- Coordinates: 43°37′50.23″N 79°25′24.80″W

Site history
- Built: 1750–51
- In use: 1751–59
- Materials: Wood
- Fate: Destroyed in 1759

Fort Rouillé was a French trading post located in what is now Toronto, Ontario, Canada. Fort Rouillé was constructed by the French in 1751, building upon the success of a trading post they established in the area a year earlier, known as Fort Toronto. Fort Rouillé was named for Antoine Louis Rouillé, who at the time of its establishment was Secretary of State for the Navy in the administration of King Louis XV. It served as a trading post with the local indigenous peoples from the region.

Fort Rouillé was evacuated and burnt down by its French garrison after the French defeat at Fort Niagara in July 1759, during the French and Indian War. The remains of the fort were demolished in the 19th century. The fort site is now part of the public lands of Exhibition Place. The location is marked by an obelisk monument, with the outline of the fort marked in concrete.

== History ==
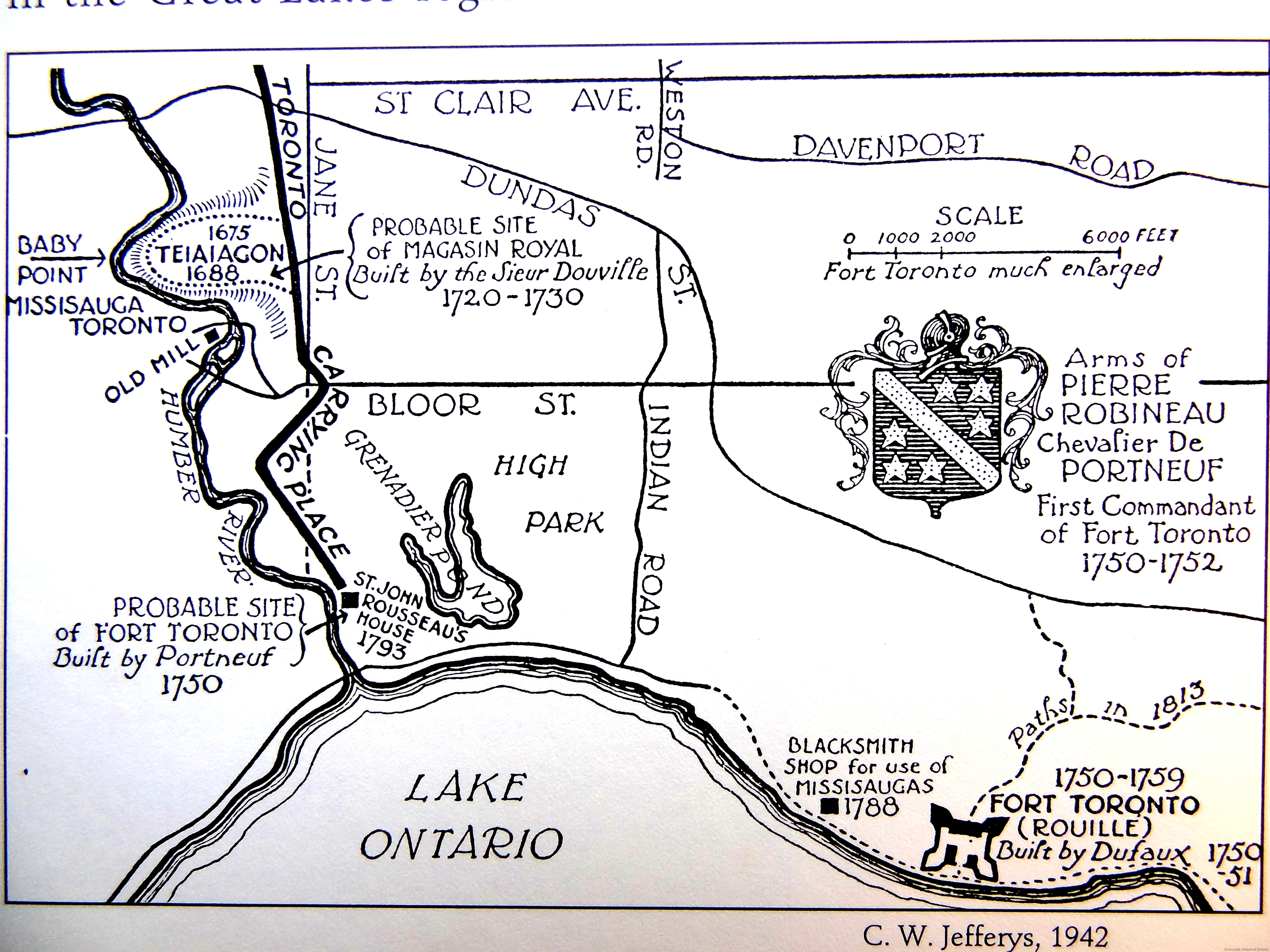
Diagram of French trading posts near the Humber River

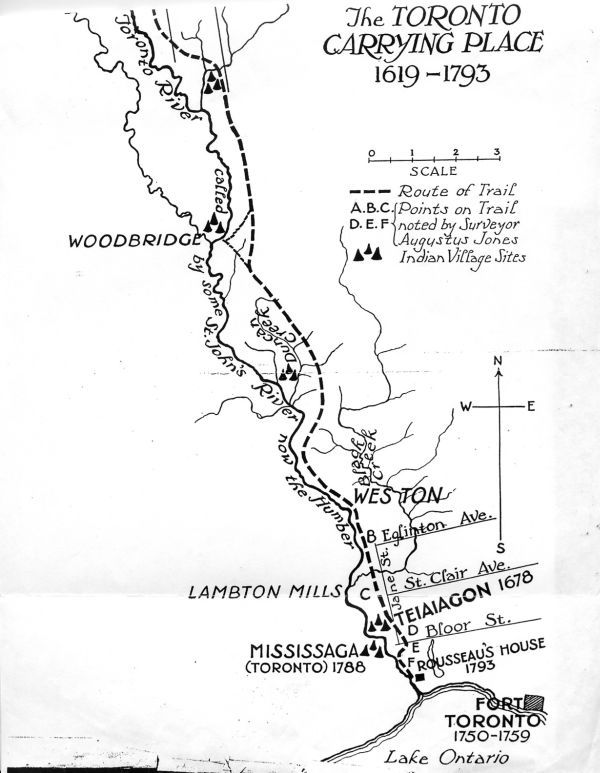
Map of the Toronto Carrying-Place Trail, with Fort Rouillé shown as "Fort Toronto" at the bottom

During the late 17th and 18th centuries, the area surrounding Toronto was frequently used by French fur traders as a shortcut to the upper Great Lakes and the area north of Toronto. In an attempt to secure the trade route from the British, the French established Magasin Royal (Fort Douville), a trading post along the Humber River near Baby Point. Completed in 1720, the trading post was abandoned shortly after the British Fort Oswego was completed in 1727, which had diverted trade away from Magasin Royal.

=== Fort Toronto (Fort Portneuf) ===
In 1750, the French built another trading post named Fort Toronto near the mouth of the Humber River, with the intention of diverting aboriginals using the Toronto Carrying-Place Trail from proceeding to the British fort in Oswego, New York. Known as Fort Toronto (or Fort Portneuf), the trading post saw immediate success, with demand outstripping the supply of goods that the post was able to provide. Fort Toronto was built by Pierre Robineau de Portneuf and was located west of Grenadier Pond, next to Jean-Baptiste Rousseau's home at the start of the Toronto Carrying-Place Trail. This encampment was typical of other New France installations in that it commanded an old riverine trade route.

=== Fort Rouillé ===
The success of Fort Toronto persuaded the Governor General of New France, the Marquis de la Jonquière, to order the construction of a larger fort, with more trading capacity and military potential, in an effort to consolidate France's hold of the region and its trade routes. Fort Rouillé, located on the site of present-day Exhibition Place, was completed in the spring of 1751. The new fort was named for Antoine Louis Rouillé, Comte de Jouy and French Minister of Marine and Colonies from 1749 to 1753. It was also known as Fort Toronto since it replaced the small trading post that was built in 1750.

The fort's construction had been ordered to further establish a French presence in the area, and to intercept the trade of indigenous people travelling towards a British fur-trading post in present-day Oswego. According to a report of the Abbé Picquet, the indigenous people received a larger amount of silver for their beavers at Oswego. Although they preferred French brandy, this was not enough to dissuade the natives from going to Oswego. "To destroy the trade there, the King's posts ought to have been supplied with the same goods as Chouegen (Oswego) and at the same price." Learning that the indigenous people travelled south along the Toronto Carrying-Place Trail, the decision was made to locate the fort at Toronto.

Abbé Picquet visited Rouillé in 1752. He found good bread and wine there and it was better equipped than other outposts. The Mississaugas there expressed a wish for Picquet to build a church there; they had only built a canteen. Picquet had worked among the Iroquois south of the lake and the Mississaugas felt that the Iroquois had been better treated.

In 1756, war was declared between Britain and France. In 1757, with the garrison elsewhere, the Mississaugas looted the fort. A message was sent to Fort Niagara and the French returned the next day to take back the fort. The Mississaugas confessed to the plot, saying that they thought the French had been driven out and they were taking items away from the British. According to a report of a Captain Pierre Pouchot, he believed that they had only wanted the French brandy.

In 1758, the order was given to reinforce Fort Niagara and all men and loyal natives were called to defend it. The fort continued to operate until 1759, during the Seven Years' War. The fort's garrison was instructed to evacuate and burn Fort Rouillé should Fort Niagara be captured. Following the French defeat at Fort Niagara in July 1759, the garrison at Fort Rouillé burnt down the fort and withdrew to Montreal. After the fall of Fort Niagara in July 1759, the British under Lieutenant Francis came to Rouillé and found only burnt timbers.

After the destruction of Fort Rouillé, no attempt was made to re-establish a settlement in the vicinity until more than thirty years later, when Governor Simcoe laid down the foundations of York in 1793, four miles east of the French stockade.

== Design ==
A first-hand account of the fort describes it. "The fort of Toronto was at the end of the bay, on the side which is quite elevated and covered by flat rock so that vessels cannot approach within cannon shot. This fort or post was a square about 180 feet on a side externally with flanks of fifteen feet. The curtains formed the buildings of the fort. It was very well built, piece upon piece, but was only useful for trade. A league west of the fort is the mouth of the Toronto river, which is of considerable size. The river communicates with Lake Huron by a portage of 15 leagues, and is frequented by the first nations, who come from the north."

It was a small, palisaded fort with a bastion at each of its four corners. The 180 by 180 feet (55 m × 55 m) fort consisted of five buildings: a corps de garde, storeroom, barracks, blacksmithy, and a building for the officers. A drawing purported to date from 1749 shows the fort adjacent to Lake Ontario. Today the location is a hundred metres or so from the lake's current shoreline, which has been infilled.

A wall surrounded the fort with an entrance to the south-facing Lake Ontario and a small road (chemin). Captain Gother Mann showed the layout in his map, "Plan of the Proposed Toronto Harbour," dated December 6, 1788. The map shows five buildings in the stockade as well as the bounds of the quadrangle enclosed by the palisades.

== Monument ==
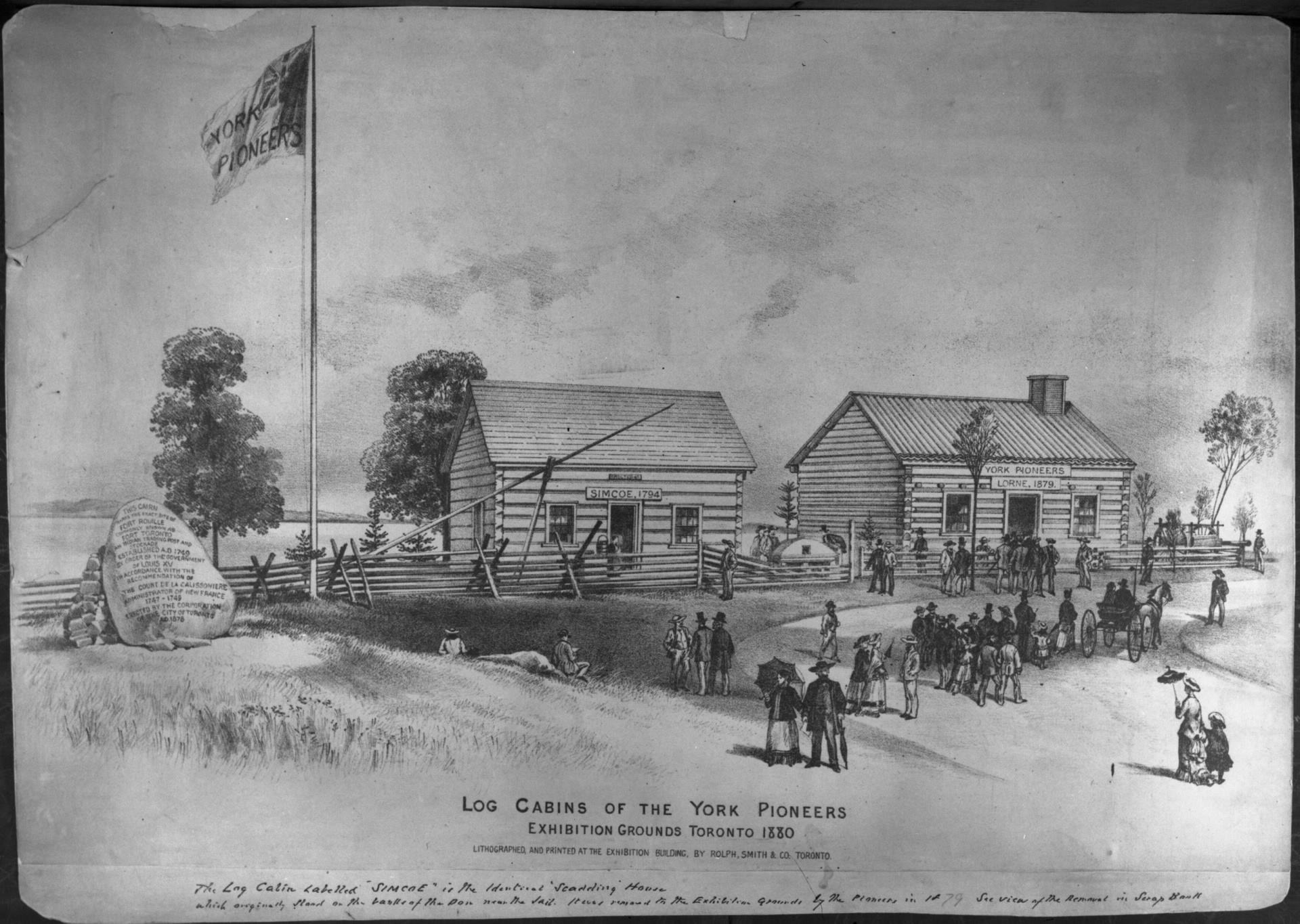
View of cairn marking location of fort near York Pioneer cabins in 1880

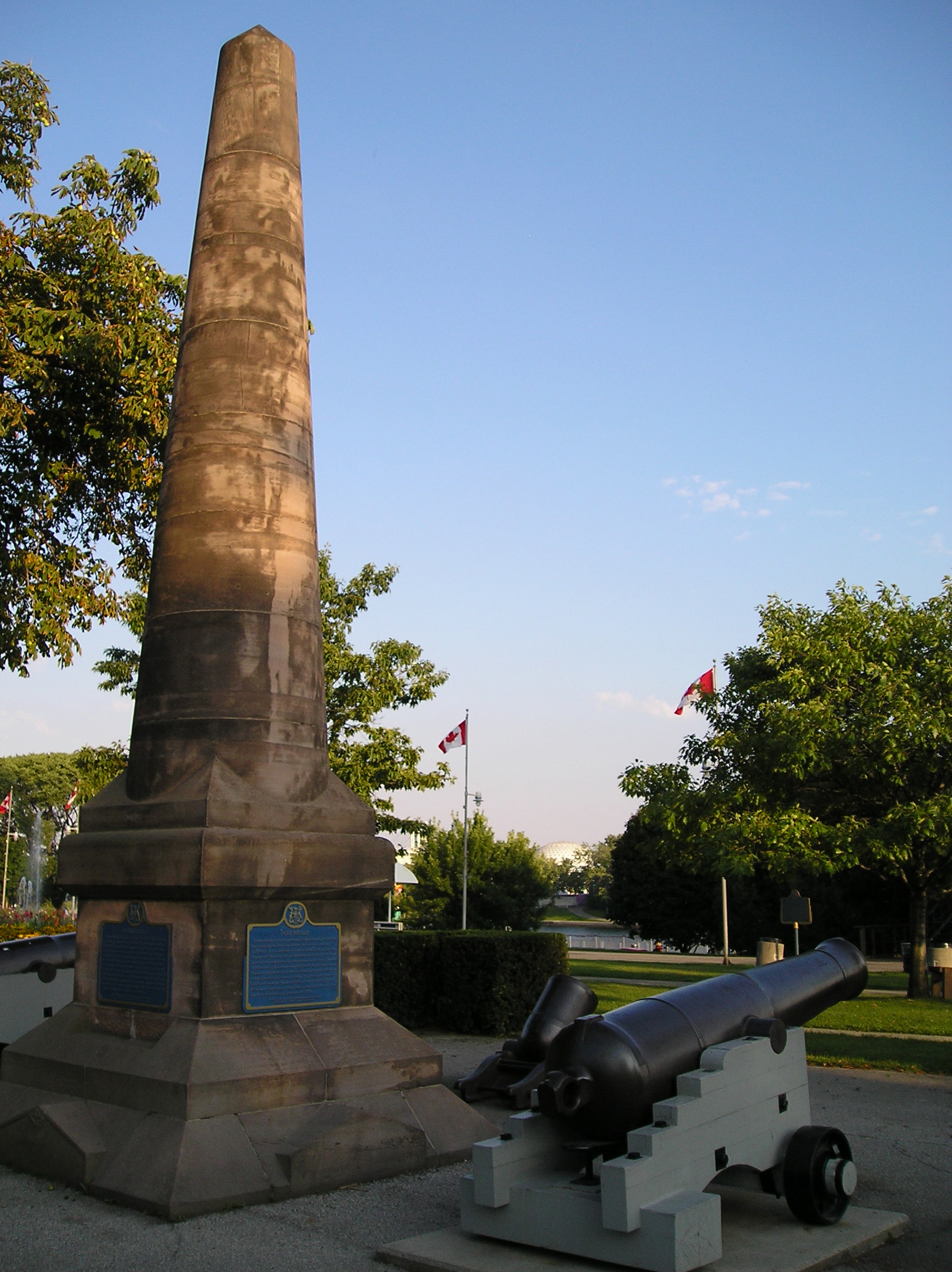
The Fort Rouillé monument at Exhibition Place marks the location of Fort Rouillé

Vestiges of the fort remained for many years afterwards. When Toronto secured part of the garrison common for the Toronto Industrial Exhibition, the fort site's mounds were levelled and some depressions filled in. To mark the spot, a large granite boulder was dredged up from the bay, inscribed "This cairn marks the exact spot of Fort Rouille, commonly known as Fort Toronto, an Indian Trading Post and Stockade. Established 1749 AD, by the order of the government of Louis XV in accordance with the recommendations of the Count de la Galissonniere, Administrator of New France 1717–1749. Erected by the Corporation of the City of Toronto, 1878."

A landscaping crew at the site in 1878 uncovered a cemetery with six remains. In the summer of 1887, a large obelisk, designed by architects Langley and Burke, was unveiled at the Toronto Industrial Exhibition to mark the spot where the original French-built Fort Rouillé was erected. It was paid for by the Exhibition Association, the city, the province and the York Pioneers. The site is now part of Exhibition Place. The obelisk is flanked by a cannon and a mortar, dating from the 1850s; they are all British. A second cannon, present on the west side of the obelisk as recently as 2005, has since been removed.

The grounds were excavated in 1979 and 1980 by the Toronto Historical Board, and again in 1982 by the Youth Committee of the Toronto Sesquicentennial Board. Two commemorative plaques – one in English, and one in French – are attached to the base of the obelisk, placed there by the Ontario Heritage Foundation. To the north, a third plaque commemorates the excavation done on the site, and to the west, a fourth plaque commemorates a visit to the site by Bertrand Delanoë, mayor of Paris, on September 6, 2003. A concrete outline of the original fort is marked on the ground.

There is a short street, Fort Rouille Street, located approximately 1 km (0.62 mi) north of the fort site accessible from Springhurst Avenue. The street at one time extended south to the fort site.

=== Plaque ===
The English-language plaque erected by the Ontario Heritage Foundation in 1957 at the Fort Rouillé monument reads:

The last French post built in present-day southern Ontario, Fort Rouillé, more commonly known as Fort Toronto, was erected on this site in 1750–51. It was established by order of the Marquis de La Jonquière, Governor of New France, to help strengthen French control of the Great Lakes and was located here near an important portage to capture the trade of Indians travelling southeast toward the British fur-trading centre at Oswego. A small frontier post, Fort Rouillé was a palisaded fortification with four bastions and five main buildings. It apparently prospered until hostilities between the French and British increased in the mid-1750s. After the evacuation of other French posts on Lake Ontario, Fort Rouillé was destroyed by its garrison in July 1759.

== See also ==
- History of Toronto
- List of French forts in North America
- List of lost buildings and structures in Toronto
- North American fur trade
- Toronto Carrying-Place Trail

== Bibliography ==
- Levine, Adam (2015). "The Carry Place". Toronto: Biography of a City. Douglas & McIntyre. ISBN 978-1-7710-0022-2.
- Robertson, J. Ross (1894). Landmarks of Toronto; a collection of historical sketches of the old town of York from 1792 until 1833, and of Toronto from 1834 to 1893, vol.1.
- Scadding, Henry (1873). Toronto of old: collections and recollections illustrative of the early settlement and social life of the capital of Ontario. Toronto, Ontario: Adam, Stevenson & Co.
- Walden, Keith (1997). Becoming modern in Toronto : the Industrial Exhibition and the shaping of a late Victorian culture. Toronto: University of Toronto Press. ISBN 0802078702.
