= List of demolished buildings and structures in Toronto =

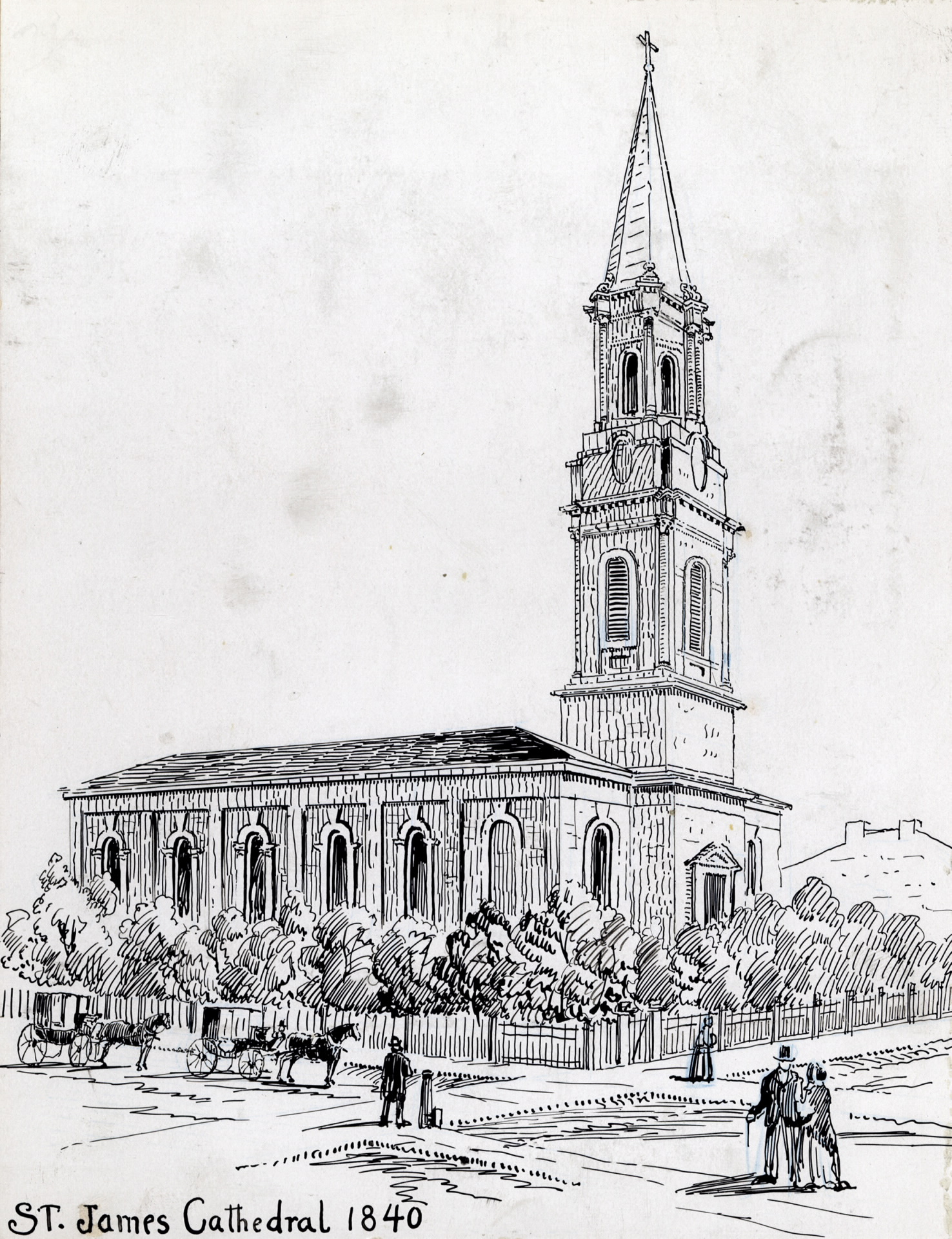
- 1840s St James Cathedral

History of Toronto
- Events: Toronto Purchase; Founding of York; Battle of York; Battle of Montgomery's Tavern; Incorporation of Toronto
- Buildings: Lost; Oldest; National Historic Sites; Great Fire 1949; Great Fire 1904

This is a list of heritage, historic or simply notable older buildings that were demolished or lost due to fire or other causes in what is now Toronto, Ontario, Canada. In some cases, facades or portions of the original buildings have been retained or reconstructed.

== York and earlier ==
Prior to the establishment of Upper Canada in 1791, the area was first inhabited by indigenous peoples. In the 1600s, the area was inhabited by Iroquois bands, but by 1700, Mississaugas had established themselves on the north shore of Lake Ontario, and the Iroquois were no longer resident. The French regime set up forts to trade with the First Nations from 1720 and later, until the British conquest in 1763. The town of York was established in 1793 after the Toronto Purchase of 1787 from the Mississaugas.

Building	Year Completed	Year Demolished	Location	Image
Teiaiagon (Iroquois village)	1600s	c. 1700	Baby Point near Jane St. and Annette St., east side of Humber River	
Ganatsekwyagon (Iroquois village)	1600s	c. 1700	East bank of Rouge River, near mouth	
Magasin Royal (Fort Douville)	1720	c. 1727 (abandoned)	Baby Point, east side of Humber River	
Fort Toronto (Fort Portneuf)	1750	c. 1751 (superseded by Fort Rouillé)	East of Humber River, near High Park's Grenadier Pond	
Fort Rouillé	1751	1759	Exhibition Place (outlines of fort are marked)	
Rousseau House and Trading Post	c. 1780	c. 1790s (abandoned)	East side of Humber River, at or about The Queensway	
First York Garrison	1793	1813 (war)	Garrison Creek at Bathurst Street	
Gibraltar Point Blockhouse	1794	1813 (war) (rebuilt 1814, abandoned 1823)	Gibraltar Point on the Toronto Islands	
Castle Frank (summer residence of John Graves Simcoe)	1794	1829 (fire)	Bloor Street at Don River	
Maryville Lodge (home of Sir David William Smith, 1st Baronet)	1796	1854	Northeast corner of King and Ontario Streets	
First Parliament Buildings	1796	1813 (war)	Front and Parliament Streets	
George Playter House	1796	c. 1834	Bloor St, north of present-day Parliament St	
George Crookshank Estate	1797	1864	West of Bathurst, south of Bloor St	
First York County Gaol	1798	1827	King St E, east of Yonge	
Elmsley House (home of John Elmsley)	1798	1862 (fire)	Simcoe Street, on the southwest corner of King Street West	
Jarvis House (home of William Jarvis)	1798		Northwest corner of Sherbourne and Duke	
Russell Abbey (home of Peter Russell)	1798	1856	Sherbourne Street, King Street East, Princess Street and Front Street	
Oak Hill (Aeneas Shaw Estate)	1798	after 1871	East of Shaw St and north of Queen St W	
Tannery of Jesse Ketchum	1790s	1820s	Front Street	
Berkeley House (home of John Small)	1790s	1925	King and Berkeley Streets	
First Government House	1800	1813 (war)	Fort York	
Rectory of the Church of St. James	1801	1902	King Street East and George Street	
Pine Grove (home of Colonel James Givins)	1802	1891	Halton Street at Givens Street	View of James Givins House "Pine Grove", north side of Halton Street and Givins Street, Toronto, 1891
McGill Cottage (home of John McGill)	1803	1870s	Church Street and Queen Street East (current location of Metropolitan United Church)	
First St. Lawrence Market building	1804	1820	Replaced by 1820 building	
Quetton St. George House and Store (later known as Baldwin House)	1807–10	1901	Northeast corner of King and Frederick Streets	
Red Lion Inn	1808	1889	Yonge Street, near Bloor	
Caer Howell	1810	1915	West of University, north of Queen St W	
Burning of York in 1813
Ketchum Family Home	1813	1839	Yonge and Adelaide Streets	
Bellevue (home of George Taylor Denison)	1815	1890	Bellevue Avenue, south of College Street	
Brookfield (John Denison Estate)	1815	1846	Northwest corner of Lot (now Queen) and Dundas (now Ossington)	
Upper Canada Central School (founded as Andrew Bell Monitorial School)	1816	1844	Adelaide and Jarvis	
Home District Grammar School – Blue School	1816	1825	College Square, north of St. James' Church	
Gore Vale (home of Duncan Cameron)	1817	1926	South of Dundas St W, west of Gore Vale Avenue	
John Strachan Residence	1818	1898	North of Front Street between York and Simcoe Streets.	
Bank of Upper Canada – first building	1818	1915		
British Wesleyan Methodist Chapel	1819	1832	George Street	
Beverley House (home of Sir John Beverley Robinson, 1st Baronet)	1810s	1913	Richmond Street, between John and Simcoe Streets	
Christopher Widmer House	1810s	1862	Front Street; moved in 1856	
George Percival Ridout Mansion (later the London House hotel)	1820	1887	West side of Dorset St, now location of Metro Hall, east of John St, south of King St W	
Second St. Lawrence Market building	1820	1831	Replaced by 1831 St. Lawrence Market building	
Second Parliament Buildings	1820	1824 (by fire)	Berkeley Street	
Davenport (home of Colonel Joseph Wells)	1821	1913	Davenport Road, east of Bathurst Street	
St. Paul's Roman Catholic Church	1822		Queen Street, east of Power Street	
Ridout Home	1822	after 1832	Duke (now Adelaide) Street, east of Prince's Street	
Joseph Cawthra Home	1824	some time after 1842	Frederick and Palace (now Front) Streets	
Farmers' Storehouse Company	1824		Front Street East and Jarvis Street	
Hazelburn (Samuel Jarvis Estate)	1824	1847	Jarvis Street, north of Lot (now Queen) Street	
Firemen's Hall (later Fire Hall No. 5)	1826	1871	Church St, north of King	
Robert Millen Cottage	1826		Teraulay (now Bay Street), north of Queen Street	
Crown Inn and Mirror Printing Office	1826			
York County Court House	1826	1852	Church Street and King Street	
Doel Brewery	1827	1900s	NW corner, Bay and Adelaide	
King's College	1827	1893	Queen's Park, replaced by Ontario Legislative Building	
(Second) York County Gaol	1827		Toronto Street and King Street	
Moss Park (William Allan Estate)	1828	1903	Sherbourne Street	
Arnold House	1829			
Clover Hill (John Elmsley Estate)	1829		St. Joseph St at Bay St	
York General Hospital (First Toronto General Hospital)	1829	1855	NW corner, King St W at John St.	
Steamboat / City Hotel	1820s		Front street	
Fish Market	1820s	1830s–1840s	Foot of Church Street	
Ontario House Hotel	1820s	1862	Wellington and Church Streets	
William Proudfoot Wines and Spirits	1820s			
Montgomery's Tavern	1830	1837 (rebellion)	Yonge and Eglinton	
Upper Canada College (first campus)	1830	1891	King St W and Simcoe St	
Andrew Ward Farm House	1830	1952	Dundas St W at Shaver Ave, Etobicoke	
St. Andrew's Church of Scotland	1831	1878	Church and Adelaide Streets	
Holland House	1831	1904	Wellington Street, between Bay and York Streets	
Third St. Lawrence Market building	1831	1849 (fire)	Replaced by 1851 St. Lawrence Market building	
Third Parliament Buildings	1832	1903	Front Street, west of Simcoe Street	
Baptist Church of York	1832			
Gooderham and Worts Windmill	1832	1859	Trinity Street south of Mill St (marked by red bricks)	
Thomas Mercer Jones Villa by John George Howard	1833			
St. James' Anglican Church by Thomas Rogers (of Kingston)	1833–39	1849 (fire)	Church and King Streets	
Canada Company Office built by John George Howard	1834		Frederick Street, between King and Front	
Freeland's Soap and Candle Factory	1830s		At the foot of Yonge Street	
William Henderson's Grocery Store – built as Crown Inn	1830s	?	King Street and Jarvis Street	
York Third Post Office	1830s			
Simon Washburn Residence	1830s?		Adelaide and George Streets	
Enoch Turner Brewery	1830s	1860s		
Chewett's Block built by John George Howard	1830s		King Street	
John Severn Brewery	1830s		Northeast of Yonge and Church Streets	
Sheldon, Dutcheer and Company Foundry	1830s	after 1843	Front Street and Yonge Street	
Joseph Bloor Brewery	1830s		Area of Mount Pleasant Road and Sherbourne Street	

== Toronto buildings ==
Toronto was established in 1834.

Building	Year Completed	Year Demolished	Location	Image
Crookshank House	1834		facade incorporated into 56 Blue Jays Way	
William Henry Draper Villa by John George Howard	1834			
James Gooderham Windmill	1834	1866	Near mouths of Taddle Creek and Don River, south of Front St E. Was survey point for laying out Toronto. Foundation exists in Gristmill Lane in the current Distillery District	
Dr. William Gwynne Cottages	1835		Dufferin Street south of King Street	
John Sleigh House	1835			
Taylor's Wharf	1835	1866?	Frederick and George Streets and Palace (Front) Street. Commemorated by Taylor's Wharf Lane	
York's 5th (Toronto's second) Custom House – 1 storey building	1835		Front Street, east of Yonge	
Elmsley Villa	1837	1875	Bay St at Grosvenor	
Freeland's Soap Factory	c. 1837	1865	Yonge St at Front St, then on the harbour	
Home District Gaol; John George Howard, architect.	1837–1841	1887	Southeast corner of Front and Berkeley Streets	
Hagerman Mansion / York House	1837		NE corner, Wellington St W at Simcoe	
First Dover Court Estate	1837	1853	Dundas St W, west of present-day Ossington	
145 King St E built by John George Howard, Thomas Young	1839		facade retained on new development	
James McDonell Store built by John George Howard	1839		Church Street	
Rusholme	1839	1954	Rusholme Road north of Dundas St W	
New Fort York	1840	1947	Exhibition Place (gate iron work used for ceremonial gateway to Guildwood Village)	
Victoria Brewery/O'Keefe Brewery	1840s (rebuilt several times)		Victoria Street and Gould Street (a fragment exists at Guild Park)	
Fire Hall No. 1	1841	1924	139–141 Bay St	
St Paul's Anglican Church	1841		Bloor Street, between Church and Jarvis	
Fire Engine No. 4	1842	1861	St. Patrick's Market; Queen St W	
Kearnsey House	1843	1904	east of Yonge St north of Wellesley, now site of Dundonald St	
Methodist Church	1844	1888	South side of Richmond Street between Yonge and Bay.	
Moffat, Murray and Company	1844	1987	36 Yonge Street (facade preserved as part of Brookfield Place	
Commercial Bank of the Midland District (William Thomas)	1845	1992	13–15 Wellingtonn Street facade preserved within BCE Place	
Samuel Peters Jarvis Property	1845			
Coffin Block Building	1845	1890s	Front Street, replaced by Gooderham Building	
Bank of British North America	1845	1871	Northeast corner, Yonge and Wellington Streets.	
Bank of Montreal	1845	1885	Northwest corner, Yonge and Front Street, rebuilt with current building	
Merchant's Bank	1845		façade retained as part of Brookfield Place, 181 Bay Street	
Homewood (residence of George William Allan) by Henry Bowyer Lane	1847	1964	Northwest corner of Wellesley and Sherbourne	
Great Toronto Fire of 1849
Government Creek Bridge	1848–1851	1900?		
Sunnyside Villa	c. 1848	1945	Sunnyside Ave at The Queensway	
Royal Lyceum	1848	1883	99 1/2 King Street West; Destroyed by fire in 1874, rebuilt, destroyed by fire in 1883	
Argyle Hotel	1849–1865	1987	1 Wellington Street West, 46 Yonge Street, Downtown (facade preserved at Brookfield Place)	
William Gordon Property	1849			
Gamble Grist Mill	c. 1850	1881 (fire)	Humber River north of Bloor St W ruins incorporated into "Old Mill" in 1980s	
Tecumseh Wigwam (tavern)	1850	1874	Bloor St W at Avenue Road (site of Park Plaza hotel)	
John Hagerty Building	1851	1987	42 Yonge St (facade retained in Brookfield Place)	
William Cawthra Building	1851	1987	44 Yonge Street (facade retained in Brookfield Place)	
Fourth St. Lawrence Market building	1851	1904	Replaced by 1904 St. Lawrence Market North building	
John Crawford Block	1852	1987	38-40 Yonge Street (facade retained as part of Brookfield Place)	
Toronto Normal School Frederick Cumberland and Thomas Ridout (Design)	1852	1963	(front façade portions incorporated into the entrance to Ryerson University's athletic centre) 40, 50 Gould Street	
Trinity College (first campus)	1852	1956	Trinity Bellwoods Park (gates retained at Queen St W)	
Cawthra House	1853	1949	Northeast corner of King and Bay Streets	
Second Dover Court Estate	1853	1933	Dundas St W, west of present-day Ossington	
Toronto Mechanics' Institute	1853	1949	Church St at Adelaide St E	
Enoch Turner Property	1854			
Provincial Lunatic Asylum	1854–1875	1975–1976	current day 999 Queen Street West	
William Hey and John Dixon Warehouse Store	1855	1983	11 Wellington West; Facade preserved as part of Brookfield Place	
Second Toronto General Hospital	1855	1913	Gerrard St, east of Parliament St	
Crystal Palace	1858	1906 (fire)	Moved and reconstructed in 1878 at Exhibition Place, replaced by Horticultural Building	
The Hall; Casimir Gzowski Estate	1858	1904	East side of Bathurst St, today's Alexandra Park	
First Toronto Union Station	1858	1873	York Street at Station Street, replaced by second Union Station	
Yorkville Town Hall	1860	1941 (fire)	856–860 Yonge Street (after demolition, some stone was retained on Fire Hall at 34 Yorkville Avenue)	
Union Mills, Weston built by John George Howard		1860s	Lawrence Avenue West and Weston Road (Side Line and High Street)	
Ontario Bank	1861	1964	North-east corner of Wellington and Scott.	
Heydon Villa	1864	1929	west of Dovercourt Road, south of College	
Great Western Railway depot (later repurposed as a fruit market)	1866	1952 (fire)	Yonge Street at Esplanade, now the site of the Sony Centre	
Alexander Street Baptist Church	1867	c. 1950s	Alexander Street between Yonge and Church streets	
Grand Central Hotel; National Hotel	1868	2013	facade preserved on 251 King Street East/39 Sherbourne Street, Old Town	
Grand Opera House	1872–74	1927	south side of Adelaide St W, between Yonge and Bay	
Customs House	1873		South-west corner of Yonge and Front Street	
St. Andrew's Market	1873	1932	Richmond Street W between Brant and Maud, south to Adelaide	
Toronto Central Prison	1873	1920	Liberty Street west of Strachan	
Second Toronto Union Station	1873	1931	South-west corner of York and Front Streets, replaced by current Union Station	
Jacob Bull House	1875	1990	14 John St, Weston	
349 Yonge Street (Steeles Tavern 1936-1974, later annex of Sam the Record Man)	1875	2009	Downtown	
Barnstable (Remegius Elmsley Estate)	1878	1921	Bay St at St. Joseph St	
Hanlan's Hotel	1878	1909(fire)	Hanlan's Point, Toronto Islands	
Allan Gardens Pavilion Hall	1879	1902 (fire)	Allan Gardens	
William Davies Co. Pork Processing Plant	1879	c. 1990	Don River at Front St E (now Corktown Common and West Don Lands land development)	
First Exhibition Grandstand	1879	1906 (fire)	Exhibition Place	
South Parkdale railway station	1879	1911	Jameson Avenue at GWR tracks	
Andrew Mercer Reformatory for Women	1880	1969	King Street West near Dufferin	
Ontario Bolt Works	1881	1989	The Queensway at South Kingsway, Swansea	
Manning Arcade; E. J. Lennox	1882	1962	22–28 King St W	
William Luke Buildings	1884	2015	774 Yonge Street (facade to be incorporated into condo project)	
Yonge St Arcade	1884	1954	137 Yonge St / 74 Victoria St	
The Beatty Building; E. J. Lennox	1886		3 King St W	
John Burns Carriage Manufacturers	1886	1996	126 John Street, Entertainment District (facade retained as part of Theatre complex, now fronts the Marshalls store)	
Robert Lauder Stores	1886	2013	267–271 Queen Street East	
Sunlight Park baseball stadium	1886	1913	Queen St E at Don River	
Cyclorama	1887	1975	Front St W at York St	
Empress Hotel	1888	2011 (fire)	335 Yonge Street	
First Parkdale Collegiate Institute (then Jameson Collegiate)	1889	1928	209 Jameson Ave (replaced by current building)	
Princess Theatre	1889	1931	167 King Street West; Destroyed by fire in 1915, rebuilt in 1917, demolished in 1931 to make way for University Avenue extension	
Cooke's Presbyterian Church	1891	1984	Queen Street East at Mutual Street	
University Avenue Armouries	1891	1963	University Avenue and Armoury Street	
Toronto Board of Trade Building	1892	1958	Front Street East and Yonge Street	
Beard Building	1894	1935	163 King St E at Jarvis St	
Temple Building (International Order of Foresters)	1896	1970	Richmond and Bay	
Hanlan's Point Stadium	1897(rebuilt 1903, 1910)	1926 (bleachers); 1937 (field removed for airport)	Hanlan's Point, Toronto Island	
John Kay Store	1898		design by S. George Curry, originally at 36–38 King Street W, facade retained at 11 Adelaide Street W	
CNE Manufacturer's Building	1902	1961 (fire)	Exhibition Place, now Better Living Centre site	
Bank of Nova Scotia headquarters	1903	1969	39 King St W (now Commerce Court)	
Great Toronto Fire of 1904, 104 buildings destroyed
St. Lawrence Market North Building	1904	1968	Replaced by current St. Lawrence Market north building, itself slated for demolition	
5 St. Joseph St Warehouse; Wickson & Gregg	1905	2010	Street facade retained around condo tower	
Second Exhibition Grandstand	1906	1947 (fire)	Exhibition Place; now site of BMO Field	
Royal Canadian Military Institute	1907	2010	426 University Avenue (historic facade reproduced 2014)	
CNE Women's Building	1908	1961	Exhibition Place, now Better Living Centre site	
Ardwold	1910	1936	Spadina Rd	
North Toronto Collegiate Institute	1912		Collegiate Gothic (facade of original building in the courtyard of current structure), 70 Roehampton Avenue	
Quebec Bank headquarters	1912	1969	King St W at Bay St, now Commerce Court	
Bank of Toronto	1913	1965	King and Bay (some stonework re-assembled at Guild Park)	
Shea's Hippodrome	1914	1957	Bay Street (demolished for Nathan Philips Square	
Land Registry Office	1915	1964	Queen St W at Bay St, now Toronto City Hall	
Savarin Tavern	1919	1980	330 Bay Street (facade initially retained, later demolished)	
Maple Leaf Stadium	1926	1967	Bathurst St at Fleet St	
National Building	1926	2009	333 Bay Street (facade retained)	
John McBride Estate	1927	2013	2621 Lake Shore Boulevard West, Mimico Built by John McBride first cousin of former Toronto mayor Sam McBride	
Westinghouse Building	1927, 1935	2016	King Street at Blue Jays Way facade retained in new development	
Commerce and Transportation Building	1929		159 Bay Street, NE corner at Front St	
Stollery Building	1929	2015	1 Bloor Street West, Toronto Men's clothing store (1929–2014); being redeveloped into 80 floor condo (The One)	
Toronto Star Building	1929	1972	King Street West and Bay Street (now First Canadian Place)	
Creeds Ltd Building	1930	1980	46 Bloor St W (now Holt Renfrew)	
First Mount Sinai Hospital building	c. 1930	2007	100 Yorkville Ave (facade retained as part of new development)	
North American Life Building	1932	1976	112 King St W (now First Canadian Place)	
William H. Wright Building (former The Globe and Mail building)	1937	1974	NE corner, King St W and York St	
Toronto Postal Terminal	1941	1997	NE corner, Bay St at Lake Shore Boulevard. (Bay St and Lake Shore facades retained in Air Canada Centre)	
Bank of Montreal Building	1948	1975	50 King St W	
Exhibition Stadium	1948	1999	Exhibition Place	
North York Fire Department Station 3	1950s	2006	Finch Avenue West west of Weston Road. Mural of station painted on building on the original site	
Workmen's Compensation Board Head Office and Ontario Provincial Police Headquarters	1953	2011	90 Harbour Street Mix of Art Deco, Art Moderne and Modern Classical; to become site of 75-storey condo, Ten York	
Hall of Fame Building; Home of Canada's Sports Hall of Fame, Hockey Hall of Fame	1961	2006	Exhibition Place. Front foyer incorporated into BMO Field	

== Scarborough ==
Building	Year Completed	Year Demolished	Location	Image
William Stewart Darling House	1830s	late 1950s	Rev Darling cottage at junction of Kingston Road and Eglinton Avenue East was once oldest buildings in Toronto.	

== See also ==
- Guild Park and Gardens
- List of oldest buildings and structures in Toronto
