= McEwen Bridge =

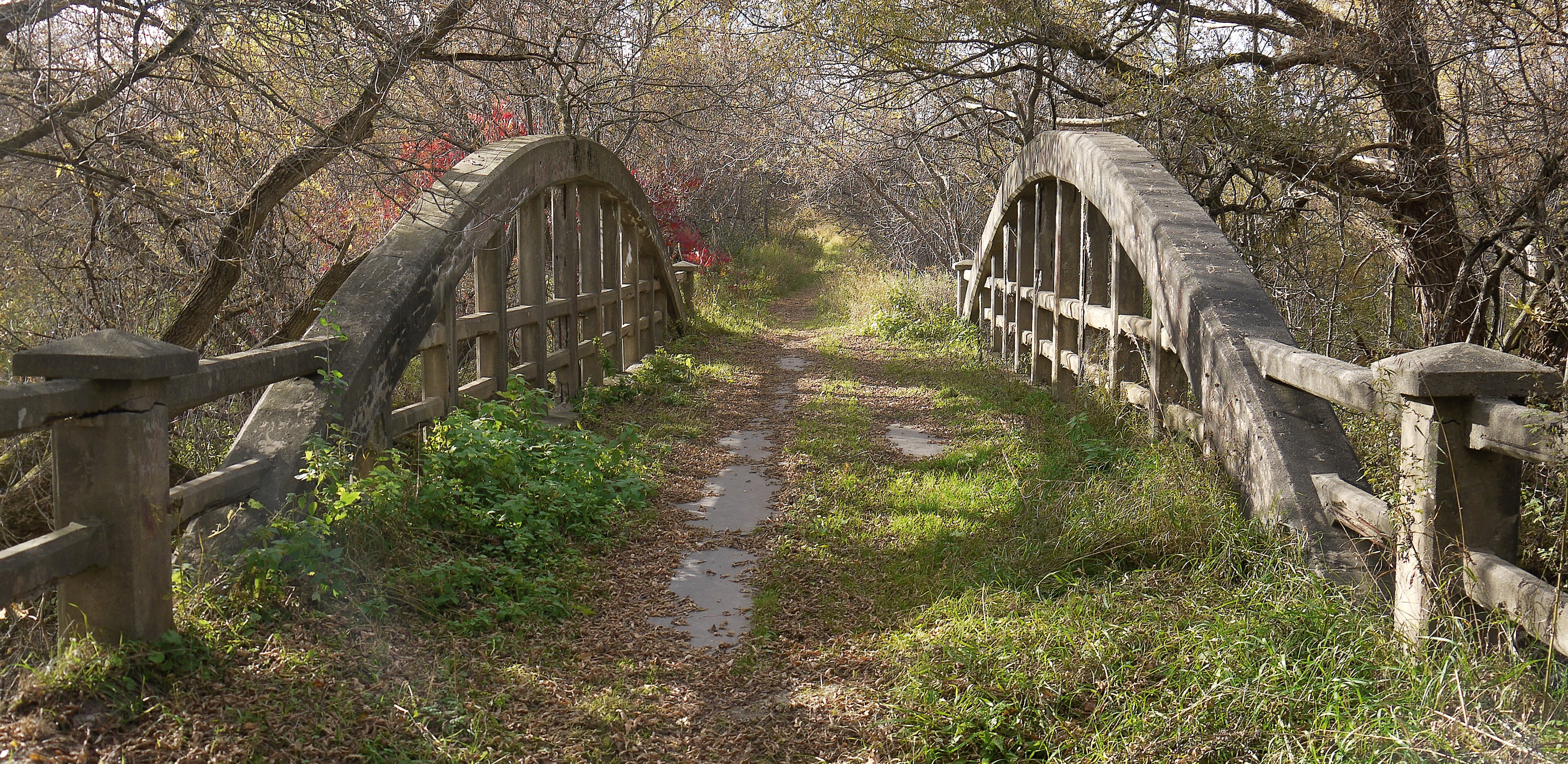
- McEwen Bridge in October 2015
- Coordinates: 43.860448°N 79.666403°W
- Crosses: Humber River
- Locale: Vaughan
- Other name(s): Burlington Bridge; Bell Bridge
- Named for: Lorne McEwen
- Owner: City of Vaughan
- Maintained by: City of Vaughan
- Heritage status: Property of interest to Cultural Services Division

Characteristics
- Design: Bowstring arch
- Material: Reinforced concrete
- Total length: 19 m
- Width: 4 m
- No. of spans: 1
- Load limit: 5 t

History
- Designer: Frank Barber
- Opened: 1923

The McEwen Bridge, spanning the Humber River in the city of Vaughan, Ontario, Canada, is listed as a property of interest to Cultural Services Division. The bowstring arch bridge, carrying Kirby Road, was completed in 1923. Closed to vehicular traffic since the late 1970s, it presently forms a part of the Humber Valley Heritage Trail. The bridge is currently in an advanced state of disrepair; a decision on its rehabilitation is pending.

== History ==
The McEwen bridge was named after Lorne McEwen, who purchased the abutting land in 1916. The bridge, designed by Frank Barber, a notable Ontario engineer, was completed in 1923 to carry a single lane of vehicular traffic on Kirby Road over the Humber River. It is one of four reinforced concrete bowstring arch bridges over the Humber, all built to Barber's design. In the late 1970s, a section of Kirby Road east of Huntington Road was abandoned due to erosion that had been deemed too costly to repair, resulting in the bridge being closed to vehicular traffic. However, the bridge has remained open to pedestrians using the Humber Valley Heritage Trail. The bridge is presently within the Nashville Conservation Reserve of the Toronto and Region Conservation Authority, forming a crucial link of its proposed system of hiking, cycling and equestrian trails.

== Current state ==
Since opening, the McEwen Bridge has not been subjected to major rehabilitation or repair and is currently in an advanced state of disrepair. In 2010, the City of Vaughan initiated an environmental assessment study for the bridge's proposed rehabilitation. The bridge scored 45.1 on the Bridge Condition Index by the Ministry of Transportation of Ontario, which is considered poor condition. Its structural integrity has been compromised in many ways, including damage to the deck, bottom arch chord, vertical arch hangers, floor beams and guard rails, with large sections affected by spalling, all of which poses significant risk to users. The EA study recommends full rehabilitation of the bridge to preserve its heritage potential and to retain a river crossing for the trail users; however, work is yet to commence.
