= Pierre Robineau de Portneuf =

- Born: August 9, 1708; Montreal
- Died: November 15, 1761 (aged 53)
- Occupation: militia officer
- Known for: built Fort Toronto

Pierre Robineau de Portneuf, was an officer in the colonial regular troops. He was born on August 9, 1708, in Montreal, Quebec, second son of René Robineau de Portneuf and Marguerite Daneau de Muy, He married Marie-Louise Dandonneau Du Sablé on April 22, 1748. He died November 15, 1761, in the shipwreck of the Auguste off Cape Breton Island.

== Biography ==
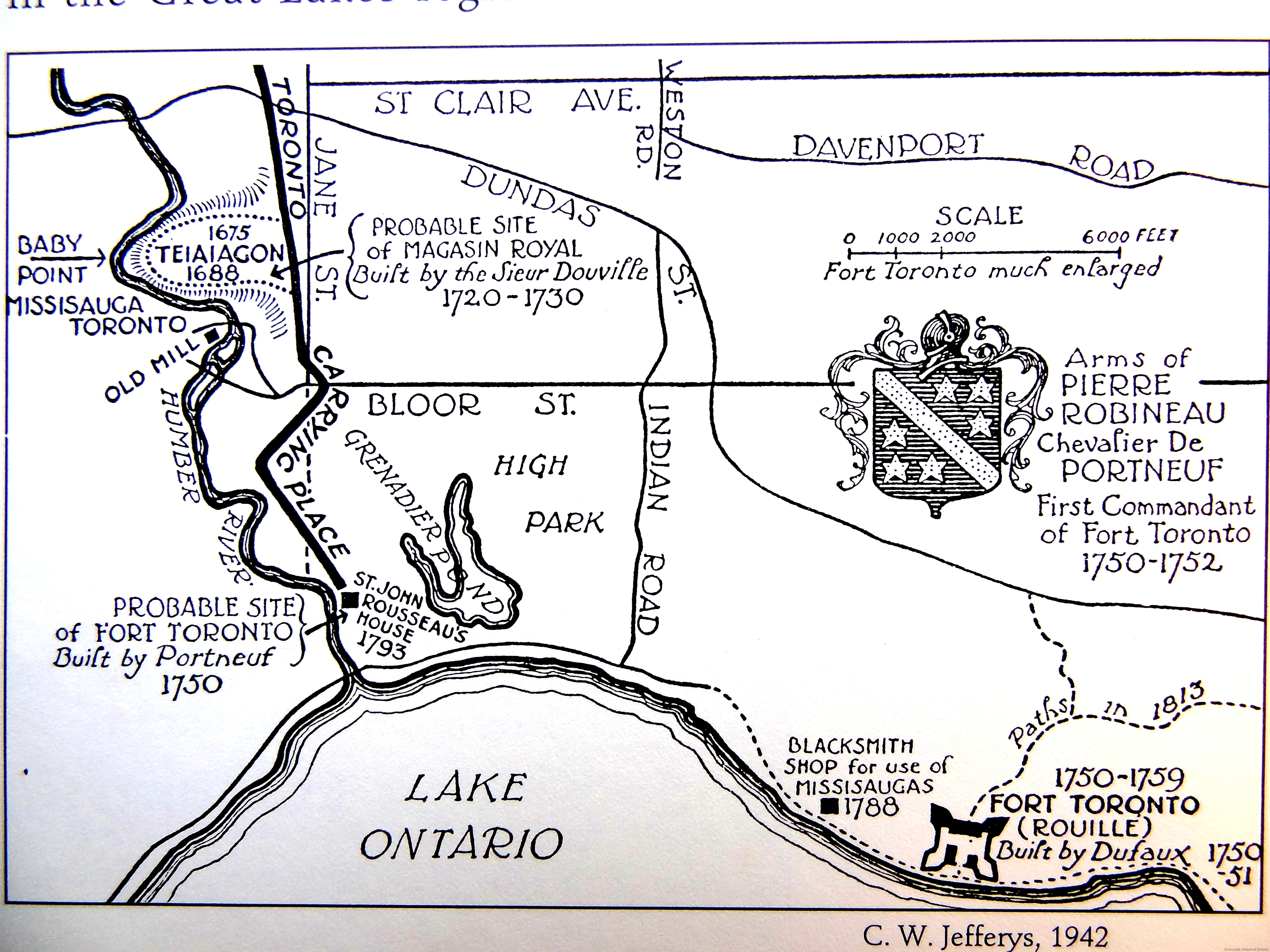
Robineau was the first commandant of Fort Toronto, from 1750 to 1752.

De Portneuf was a cadet for the colonial regular troops in 1729 at Michilimackinac, Michigan. On April 1, 1733, he was promoted second ensign, and on October 1, 1740, he was made an ensign on the active list in Louisiana. On 15 April 1750 the minister of Marine, Antoine Louis Rouillé, consenting to a request made by Governor Marquis de la Jonquière and Intendant François Bigot, granted permission to build a small fortified post at Toronto on the shore of Lake Ontario. The authorities of the colony hoped by this means to attract the Indians in the region, probably the Mississaugas, to trade with the French and thus dissuade them from taking their furs to the English at Fort Oswego. Pierre Robineau de Portneuf, who was an ensign at Fort Frontenac, was designated to carry out the project. The Sieur de Portneuf set out on May 20, 1750, and reached Toronto some time later. While the necessary provisions and articles for trade were being forwarded from Montreal, he began to build the fort that was planned on the east bank of the Toronto river, near its mouth. Within two months a warehouse and a stockade were put up. Trade with the Indians at Fort Toronto proved successful, and by July 17, a shipment of furs worth 18,000 livres had been sent to Montreal. This result surpassed expectations. On August 20, the governor wrote to the minister to acquaint him of the success and to inform him that he intended to build a new and larger fort at the point of the peninsula called La Baye. He recommended the Sieur de Portneuf for this new project. Recalling the reasons for building the first post, he noted that they were more than ever valid. Moreover, he suggested the possibility of persuading the Indians to destroy Fort Oswego. He asked the minister’s permission to give the name Rouillé to the new fort in honor of him. Work was begun in the autumn of 1750 and went ahead throughout the winter. The fort was almost finished in April 1751, when the Sieur de Portneuf returned from Fort Frontenac, where he had spent the winter. He was in command at Fort Rouillé during the 1751 trading season, and returned to Fort Frontenac in the autumn. Early in 1752 he was replaced as commandant of Fort Rouillé by Thomas Robutel de La Noue.

In 1756, he was appointed commandant of Fort Presque Isle. The following year he was promoted captain. He played an active role in the engagements in the Ohio valley during the Seven Years' War. When Fort Niagara was under attack in 1759, he was busy at Fort Presque Isle rallying the Indians of the west. After Fort Niagara surrendered, he sent an emissary under a flag of truce to William Johnson, set fire to Fort Presque Isle, and went to Detroit, where he surrendered to the English. In October 1761, he sailed from Quebec on the Auguste for France, perhaps with the hope of making a new career for himself there. One month later, he was among the 113 passengers and crew members who perished when the Auguste sank off Cape Breton Island.

== See also ==
- Canadian Hereditary Peers
