= Humber Bay Arch Bridge =

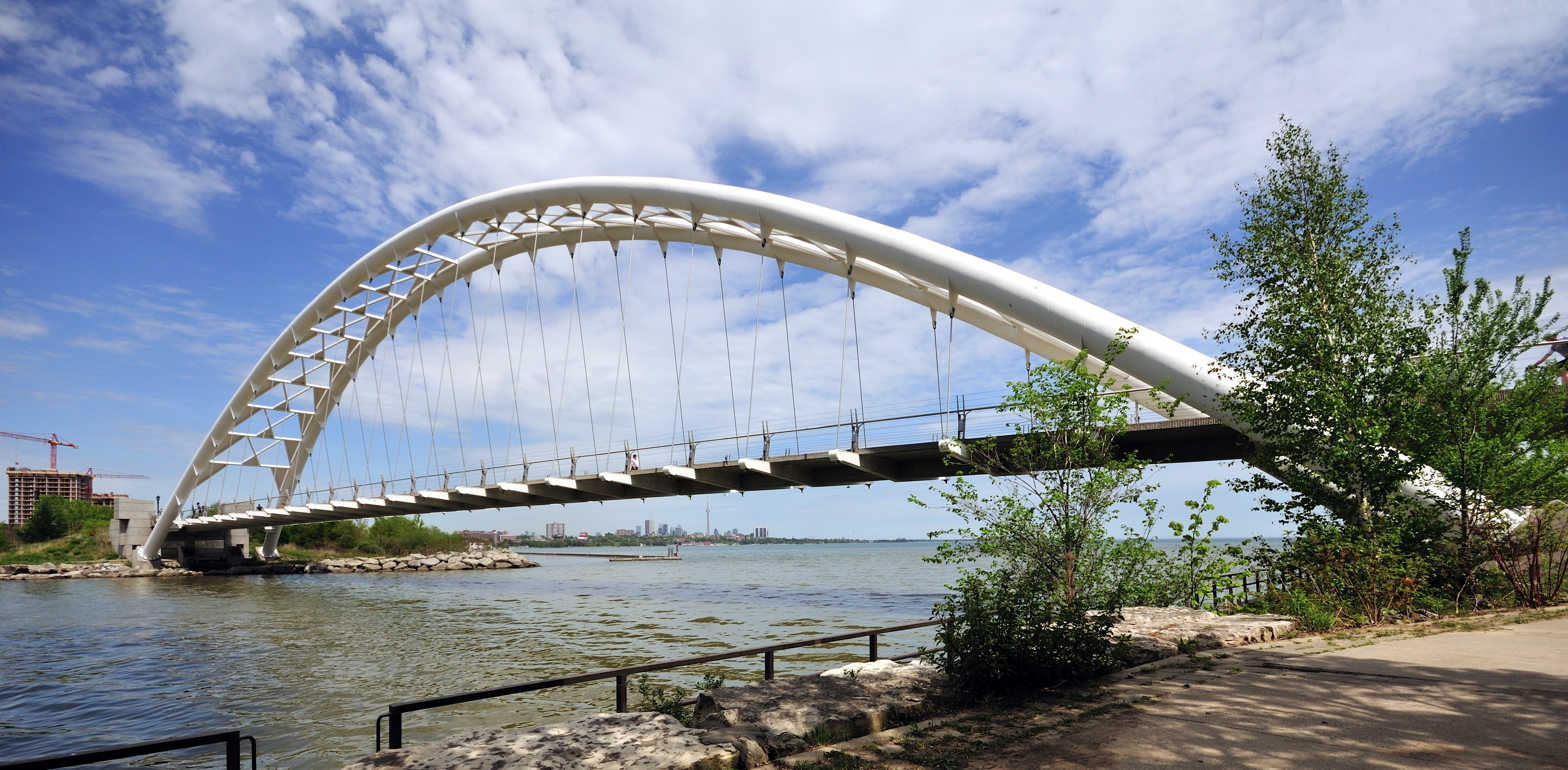
- The Humber Bay Arch Bridge seen from the west bank of the Humber River
- Coordinates: 43.631896°N 79.471246°W
- Carries: pedestrian & bicycle traffic
- Crosses: Humber River
- Locale: Toronto
- Maintained by: Toronto Transportation Services

Characteristics
- Design: Double-ribbed arch bridge
- Material: Steel tubes
- Total length: 130 metres (430 ft)
- Height: 21.3 metres (70 ft) above grade
- Longest span: 100 metres (330 ft)
- No. of spans: 1
- Piers in water: 0

History
- Designer: Montgomery and Sisam Architects
- Construction end: 1994

Location
- Interactive map of Humber Bay Arch Bridge

The Humber Bay Arch Bridge (also known as the Humber River Arch Bridge, the Humber River Pedestrian Bridge, or the Gateway Bridge) is a pedestrian and bicycle through arch bridge south of Lake Shore Boulevard West in Toronto, Ontario, Canada. Completed in the mid-1990s, the bridge is part of the Martin Goodman Trail and is 139 metres (456 ft) in length, with a clear span of 100 metres (330 ft) over the mouth of the Humber River to protect the environmental integrity of the waterway.

== Design ==
The bridge is constructed of two 1,200 millimetres (47 in) diameter high-strength steel pipes, bent into twin arches that rise 21.3 metres (70 ft) above grade, and suspend the deck by way of 44 stainless-steel hangers, each 50 millimetres (2.0 in) in diameter. The foundation consists of concrete-filled caissons which go down 30 metres (98 ft) below grade to the bedrock.

Designed in 1994 by Montgomery Sisam Architects of Toronto and Delcan Corporation (bridge engineers), it was constructed by Sonterlan Construction, and is the recipient of numerous local architectural, design and engineering awards. The bridge is situated at the mouth of the Humber River, the start of the "Toronto Carrying Place" trail, an ancient aboriginal trading route leading north, and thus features design elements and decorations such as carved turtles and canoes that evoke this native heritage.

The bridge forms an important pedestrian, recreational and commuter cyclist link, and carries the Waterfront Trail, a multi-use pathway that will eventually parallel the entire north shore of Lake Ontario. The Toronto section is known as the Martin Goodman Trail, and is one of the most popular pedestrian and cycling routes in the city.

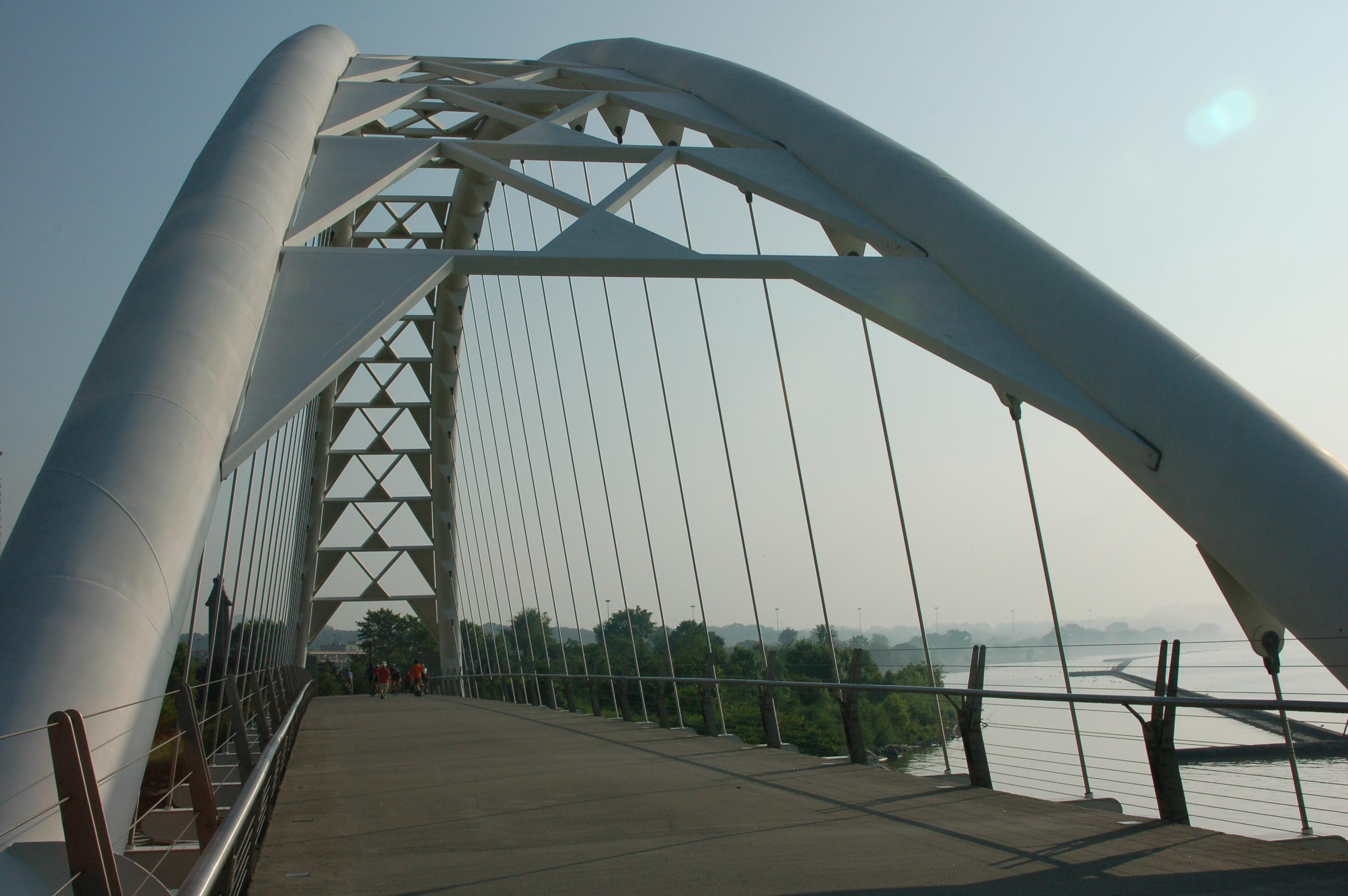
Bridge from one portal

Humber Bay Arch Bridge

== See also ==
- Waterfront Trail
