= Toronto Carrying-Place Trail =

Portage route linking Lake Ontario and Lake Simcoe

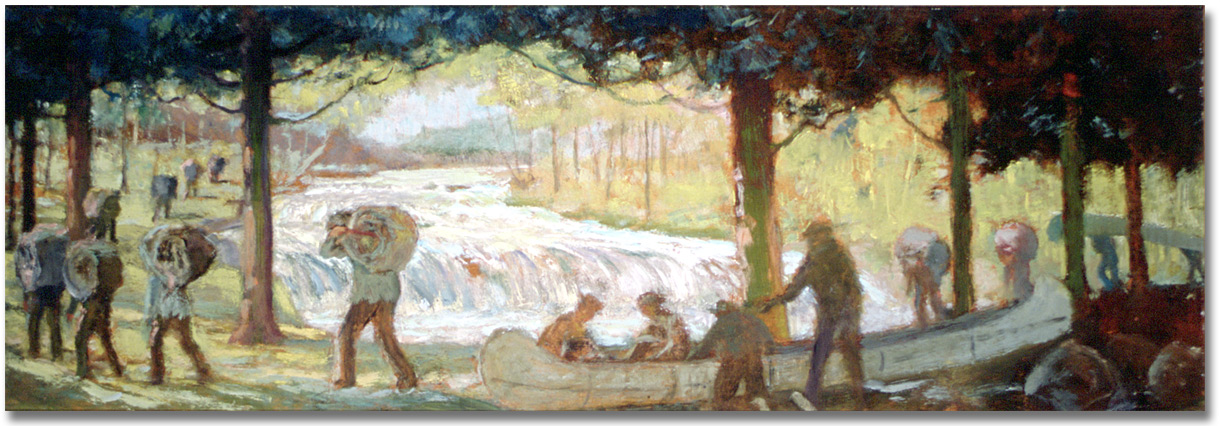
The Toronto Carrying-Place Trail was a crucial point for travel, with the Humber and Rouge rivers providing a shortcut to the upper Great Lakes.

The Toronto Carrying-Place Trail, also known as the Humber Portage and the Toronto Passage, was a major portage route in Ontario, Canada, linking Lake Ontario with Lake Simcoe and the northern Great Lakes. The name comes from the Mohawk term tkaronto, meaning "the place where the trees grow over the water", an important landmark on Lake Simcoe through which the trail passed.

== Route ==
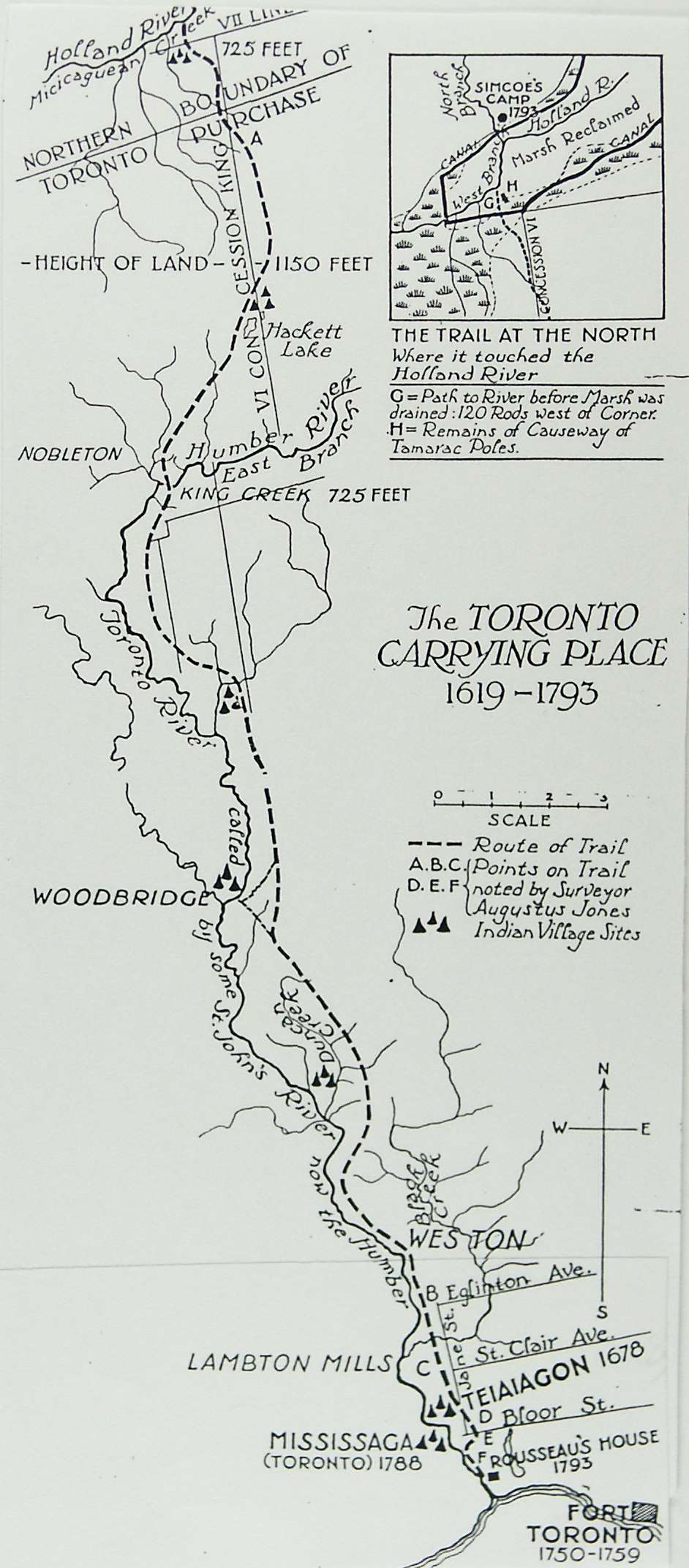
Map of the Toronto Carrying-Place Trail along the Humber River.

From Lake Ontario, the trail ran northward along the eastern bank of the Humber River. It forked at Woodbridge, with one path crossing the east branch of the Humber and running along the west side of the river to the vicinity of Kleinburg, where it crossed the river again. This trail was probably used during the seasons when the water was low enough to ford. The other path of the fork followed the east side of the river and angled cross-country to King Creek, joining the other fork before crossing the river near Nobleton, some 50 kilometres (31 mi) north of Lake Ontario. From there it runs north over the Oak Ridges Moraine to the western branch of the Holland River, and from there north-east into Lake Simcoe some 80 kilometres (50 mi) north.

A second route of the trail runs from Lake Ontario at the Rouge River, following the river northwest to the Oak Ridges Moraine. Crossing the Moraine it met the eastern branch of the Holland River near Aurora, Ontario. This arm appears to have been favoured by the French explorers in the area, without ever having seen the Humber arm. Near the mouth of the Rouge River, the Seneca had established a village by the name of Ganatsekwyagon. The Bead Hill site in Rouge Park is believed to contain the archaeological remains of the village. Traces of a village have been found on the Oakdale Golf & Country Club grounds, adjacent to the Toronto Carrying-Place Trail.

Once into Lake Simcoe, known as Ouentironk among the First Nations people living in the area, the trail continues north through straits on the north end of the lake into Lake Couchiching. These straits, an important fishing area, gave rise to the name Toronto, as this is "the place where the trees grow over the water". The First Nations peoples had planted trees in the narrows between the lakes to act as a weir to catch fish, at what is now known as the Mnjikaning Fish Weirs historic site. From there the trail follows the Severn River into Georgian Bay. Many of the major First Nations tribes lived in the area around and to the north of Lake Simcoe, which were easily reachable via the many rivers leading to the lake.

It is widely stated that the first European to see the Humber arm was Étienne Brûlé, who travelled it with a group of twelve Huron in 1615. However it is now believed that this is in error, and he actually travelled further west, to Lake Erie.

Further French settlement used the Humber portion of the trail primarily. Near the mouth of the Humber and along the Toronto Passage was a trading post called Teiaiagon, where the French and English met with the locals for trading. The site is marked with a plaque, and the ruins of a 19th-century mill stood nearby until the year 2000, when it was demolished and replaced by a new hotel, built in the style of the existing adjacent Tea Room. This included the construction of three forts on or near the trail. The first of these, known as Magasin Royal or Fort Douville, was built in 1720 about 2 kilometres (1.2 mi) north of Lake Ontario on the Humber. The second, Fort Toronto, was built in 1750 only a few hundred metres north of the lake, right on the trail. The final one, Fort Rouillé (but also known widely as Fort Toronto), was built about 2 kilometres (1.2 mi) to the east of the river during 1750 and 1751, and the site lies near the current bandstand at Exhibition Place.

The trail was widely used by both French and English fur traders until Toronto started to be permanently settled in the early 19th century, bringing to a close over a millennium of use. The connection north to Lake Simcoe was then made along Yonge Street, constructed after Simcoe followed the eastern branch into Toronto.

== See also ==
- Great Indian Warpath
- Name of Toronto
