= Antoine Louis Rouillé =

French statesman

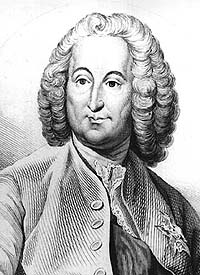
Antoine-Louis Rouillé

Antoine-Louis Rouillé, comte de Jouy (French pronunciation: [ɑ̃twan lwi ʁuje kɔ̃t də ʒwi], 7 June 1689 – 20 September 1761) was a French statesman and comte of Jouy-en-Josas.

Born in Paris, the son of Marie-Louis-Paulin Rouillé and Marie-Angélique d'Aquin, he was in succession conseiller to the parlement de Paris (1711), maître des requêtes (1717), intendant of commerce (1725), conseiller d'État and finally commissaire to the French East India Company (1744). Named Secretary of State for the Navy to replace Maurepas, he worked to reorganise the French Navy. He left this ministry on 24 July 1754 to hold that of Foreign Secretary. As Foreign Secretary, Rouillé generally pursued a pacific policy, trying to avoid escalation of the increasingly bitter colonial feud with Britain in North America. His role in French foreign policy, however, was not central, as most of the important initiative during the time of his ministry was conducted personally by King Louis XV and his favorite Madame de Pompadour. Rouillé was unable to prevent the escalation of the Anglo-French conflict into open war in 1756. Although he had little to do with the diplomatic maneuvers which led to the Diplomatic Revolution of 1756, Rouillé, as Foreign Secretary, was one of the French signatories of the first Treaty of Versailles (1756), which joined France and Austria together in an alliance. Soon after the conclusion of that alliance led to open war between France and its former ally, Prussia, in late 1756, Rouillé was replaced as Foreign Secretary on 28 June 1757 by Cardinal de Bernis. He died in Neuilly.

== Legacy ==
- Fort Rouillé - built in 1750-51 in what is now Toronto and was a French trading post.
