= Humber River (Ontario) =

River in Canada

Humber River Cobechenonk
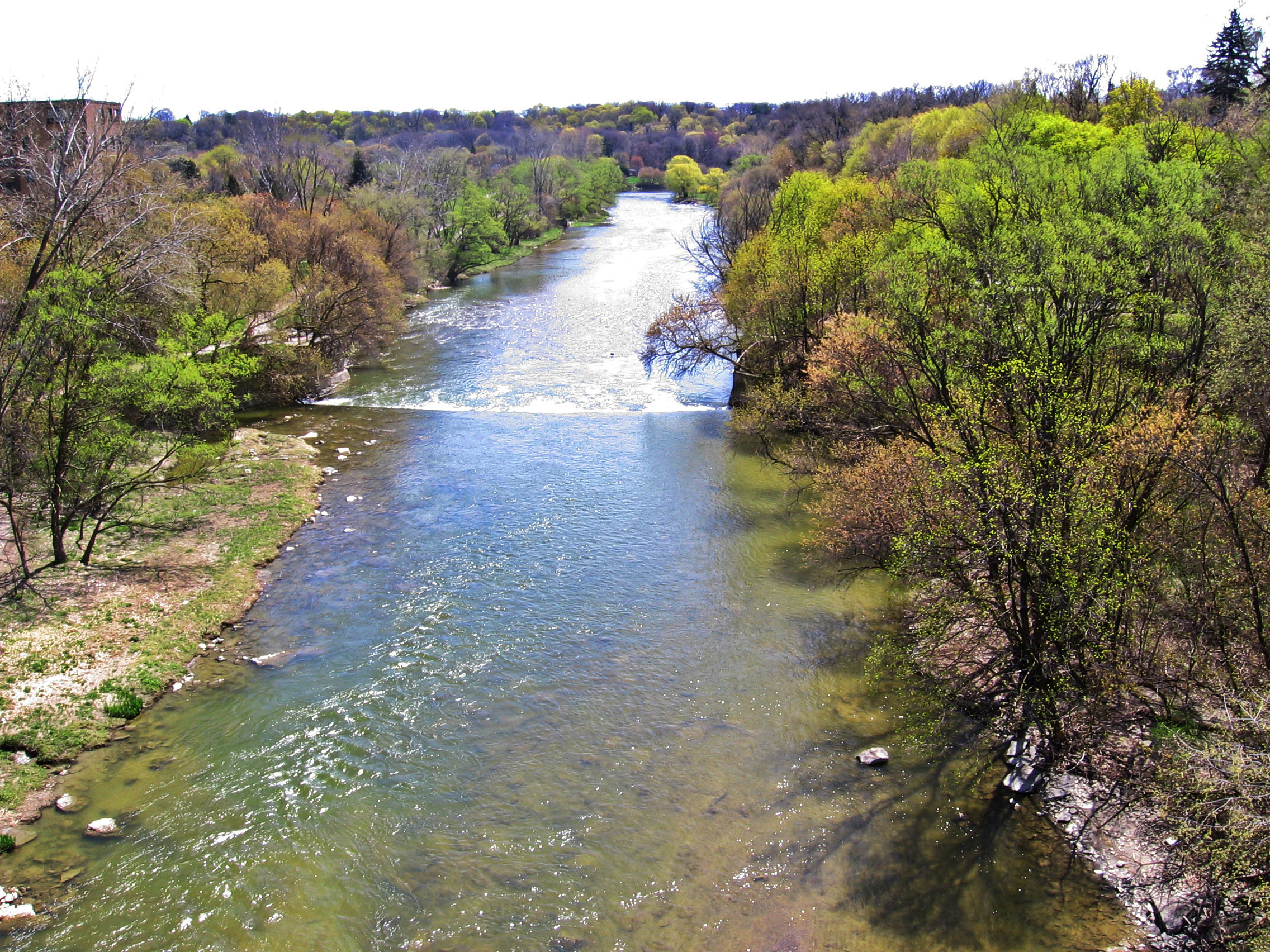
- The Humber River in Toronto
- Native name: Gabekanaang-ziibi (Ojibwe)

Location
- Country: Canada
- Province: Ontario
- Region: Southern Ontario
- Census divisions: Dufferin County; Regional Municipality of Peel; Simcoe County; Regional Municipality of York
- Municipalities: Toronto; Adjala–Tosorontio; Brampton; Caledon; King; Mono; Vaughan

Physical characteristics
- Source: Humber Springs Ponds
  - location: Mono, Dufferin County
  - coordinates: 43°56′36″N 80°00′14″W
  - elevation: 421 m (1,381 ft)
- Mouth: Humber Bay, Lake Ontario
  - location: Toronto
  - coordinates: 43°37′56″N 79°28′19″W
  - elevation: 74 m (243 ft)
- Length: 100 km (62 mi)
- Basin size: 903 km^{2} (349 sq mi)

Basin features
- River system: Great Lakes Basin

The Humber River (Ojibwe: Gabekanaang-ziibi, lit. 'river at the end of the trail') is a river in Southern Ontario, Canada. It is in the Great Lakes Basin, is a tributary of Lake Ontario and is one of two major rivers on either side of the city of Toronto, the other being the Don River to the east. It was designated a Canadian Heritage River on September 24, 1999.

The Humber collects from about 750 creeks and tributaries in a fan-shaped area north of Toronto that encompasses portions of Dufferin County, the Regional Municipality of Peel, Simcoe County, and the Regional Municipality of York. The main branch runs for about 100 kilometres (60 mi) from the Niagara Escarpment in the northwest, while another major branch, known as the East Humber River, starts at Lake St. George in the Oak Ridges Moraine near Aurora to the northeast. They join north of Toronto and then flow in a generally southeasterly direction into Lake Ontario at what was once the far western portions of the city. The river mouth is flanked by Sir Casimir Gzowski Park and Humber Bay Park East.

== Name ==
There are two indigenous names attributed to the Humber. One is "Cobechenonk", for "leave the canoes and go back", attributed to the area's most recent native inhabitants, the Anishinaabe. A second is “Niwa’ah Onega’gaih’ih,” “Little Thundering Waters.” A French map from 1688 called the river "passage de taronto", while Popple's map of 1733 shows the "Tanaovate River" beside the native settlement of Tejajagon. Lieutenant-Governor John Graves Simcoe named it the Humber River, likely after the Humber estuary in England.

== History ==
The Humber has a long history of human settlement along its banks. Native settlement of the area is well documented archaeologically and occurred in three waves. The first settlers were the Palaeo-Indians who lived in the area from 10,000 to 7000 BC. The second wave, people of the Archaic period, settled the area between 7000 and 1000 BC and began to adopt seasonal migration patterns to take advantage of available plants, fish, and game. The third wave of native settlement was the Woodland period, which saw the introduction of the bow and arrow and the growing of crops which allowed for larger, more permanent villages. The Woodland period was also characterized by movement of native groups along what is known today as the Toronto Carrying-Place Trail, running from Lake Ontario up the Humber to Lake Simcoe and eventually to the northern Great Lakes.

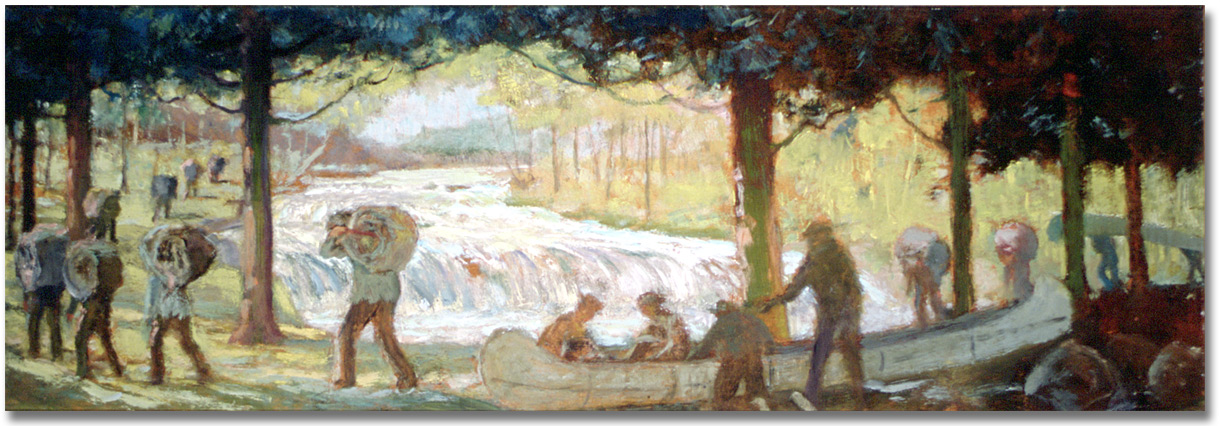
By the 17th century the area was a crucial point for travel, with the Humber River making up the southern portion of the Toronto Passage.

It is believed that Étienne Brûlé was the first European to encounter the Humber while travelling the Toronto Carrying-Place Trail. Brûlé passed through the watershed in 1615 on a mission from Samuel de Champlain to build alliances with native peoples, but left no written record. The Trail became a convenient shortcut to the upper Great Lakes for traders, explorers, and missionaries. A major landmark on the northern end of the trail in Lake Simcoe was used to describe the trail as a whole, and eventually the southern end became known simply as "Toronto" to the Europeans.

During the 1660s, this was the site of Teiaiagon, a permanent settlement of the Seneca used for trading with the Europeans. Popple's map of 1733 shows a prominent river beside "Tejajagon" issues; it is assumed to be the Humber.

During the late-17th and 18th century, the portage along this river was frequently used by the French traders as a short cut to the upper Great Lakes and the area north of Toronto. In an attempt to secure the trade route from the British, the French established Magasin Royal, a trading post along the Humber River, near Baby Point. Completed in 1720, the trading post was abandoned shortly after the British fort in Oswego, New York was completed, as it diverted trade away from Magasin Royal.

In 1750, the French built another fort near the mouth of the Humber River, with the intention of diverting aboriginals using it as a passage from proceeding to the British in Fort Oswego. Known as Fort Toronto, the fort saw immediate success, with demand outstripping the supply of goods the Fort was able to provide. The success of the fort persuaded the Governor General of New France, the Marquis de la Jonquière to order the construction of a larger fort, with more trading capacity and military potential, in an effort to consolidate its hold of the region. Fort Rouillé, located in present-day Exhibition Place (west of the Humber River), was completed in the spring of 1751. The fort continued to operate until 1759, during the Seven Years' War. Instructed to evacuate and raze the fort should Fort Niagara be captured, the garrison would vacate the area for Montreal after they were defeated at Fort Niagara in July 1759.

The area was later secured by British forces in September 1760, when the British Army dispatched its chief scout and intelligence officer, Robert Rogers, along with 200 men and fifteen whale boats to take control of the former French fort. In 1772, Jean-Bonaventure Rousseau received a license to trade with the First Nations living within the vicinity of the mouth of the Humber River. His license was later inherited by his son, Jean Baptiste Rousseau, after his death in 1774. Rousseau maintained several contacts in the area, although did not permanently relocate there until 1792; when he established a trading post near the mouth of the Humber River.

Rousseau piloted John Graves Simcoe's ship into Toronto Bay to officially commence the settlement of York in 1793. Most of the British attention was focused to the east of the Humber, around the protected Toronto Bay closer to the Don River. Settlement was scattered until after the War of 1812 when many loyalists moved to the area, who were joined by immigrants from Ireland and Scotland who chose to remain in British lands.

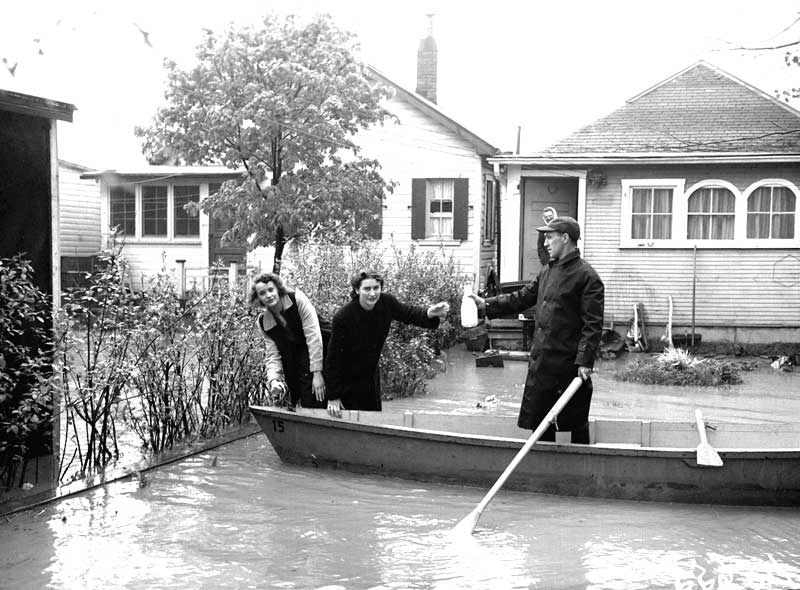
The Humber River saw water levels rise significantly after Hurricane Hazel. The resulting flood devastated nearby residences on Raymore Drive.

Upon his arrival in York, Simcoe was keenly aware of the need for a lumber mill and grist mill in the area. He had constructed a sawmill on the west bank of the river near present-day Bloor Street in 1793, which was operated by John Wilson. In 1797 Simcoe managed to get a grist mill established on the Humber River. It was owned and operated by John Lawrence. Over the years, numerous mills have been operated along the river by such men as William Cooper, W. P. Howland, Thomas Fisher, John Scarlett, William Gamble and Joseph Rowntree. The last grist mill on the Humber, Hayhoe Mills in Woodbridge, closed in 2007.

Prominent builder and Woodbridge founder Rowland Burr had thought up the idea of a building shipping canal from Lake Ontario to Georgian Bay along the main and east branches of the Humber River in the 1840s, and traversed the route himself north to Georgian Bay. In 1857, he proposed a 12 foot deep canal of 120 feet wide, with 64 cut stone double locks. Despite repeated efforts into the 1890s (including petitioning for a grant of land to begin raising stock for the construction in 1862) the idea gained no traction.

By 1860, the Humber Valley was extensively deforested. This decreased the stability of the river banks and increased damages done by periodic flooding. In 1878, a disastrous flood destroyed the remaining water-powered mills. As the Toronto area grew, the lands around the Humber became important farming areas; in addition, some areas of the river's flood plain were developed as residential. This led to serious runoff problems in the 1940s, which the Humber Valley Conservation Authority was established to address. But in 1954, Hurricane Hazel raised the river to devastating flood levels, destroying buildings and bridges; on Raymore Drive, 60 homes were destroyed and 35 people were killed. In the aftermath, preventative flood control efforts were taken including building channels, dams, reservoirs, and purchasing land around the Humber to establish flood plains, in a effort to prevent development on adjacent low-lying lands prone to flooding.

The Metropolitan Toronto and Region Conservation Authority (MTRCA later TRCA) succeeded the Humber Valley authority in 1957 (the word "Metropolitan" was dropped in 1998). More recently, a task force within the Authority was formed to further clear the Humber as a part of the Great Lakes 2000 Cleanup Fund.

== Geography ==
The Humber River begins at Humber Springs Ponds on the Niagara Escarpment in Mono, Dufferin County and reaches its mouth at Humber Bay on Lake Ontario in the city of Toronto. The West Humber River goes through the Claireville Conservation Area, joining the east branch at Summerlea Park.

=== Watershed ===
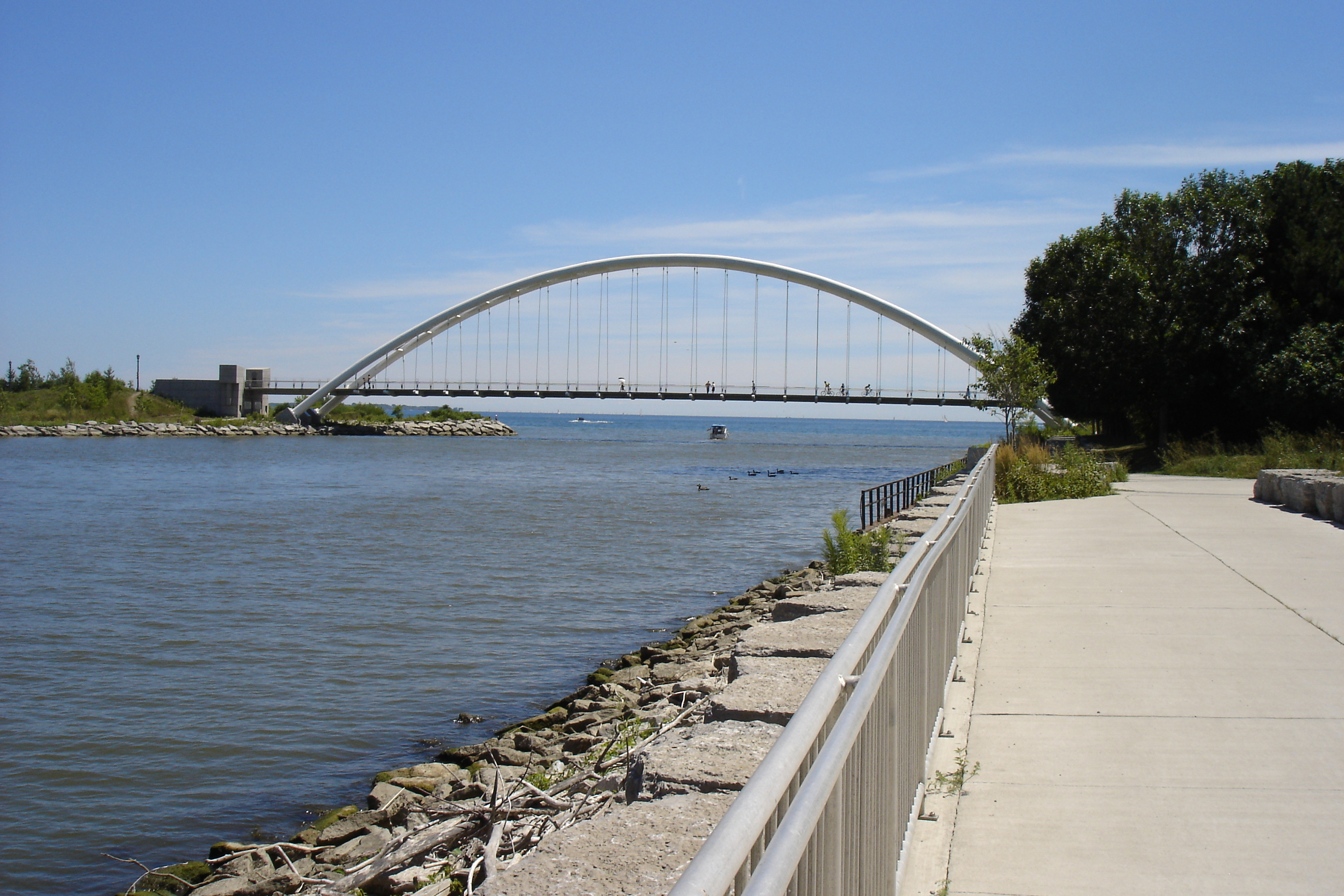
Mouth of Humber River at Lake Ontario, with Humber Bay Arch Bridge

The Humber watershed is a hydrological feature of south-central Ontario, Canada, principally in north and west Toronto. It has an area of 903 square kilometres (349 sq mi), flowing through numerous physio-graphic regions, including the Oak Ridges Moraine and the Niagara Escarpment. The watershed is bounded on the west by the Credit River, Etobicoke Creek and Mimico Creek watersheds, and on the east by the Garrison Creek, Don River and Rouge River watersheds, all six of which empty into Lake Ontario; on the north by the Nottawasaga River which empties into Lake Huron; and on the northeast by the Holland River, which empties into Lake Simcoe.

Unlike the Don to the east, the Humber remained relatively free from industrialization as Toronto grew. Since the flooding of Hurricane Hazel, it has been largely developed or redeveloped as parkland, with the extensive and important wetlands on its southern end remaining unmolested. Whereas the mouth of the Don is often clogged with flotsam and is obstructed by low bridges, the Humber is navigable and used for recreation and fishing.

Today the majority of the Toronto portion of the Humber is parkland, with paved trails running from the lake shore all the way to the northern border of the city some 30 km away. Trails following the various branches of the river form some 50 km of bicycling trails, much of which are in decent condition. Similar trails on the Don tend to be narrower and in somewhat worse condition, but the complete set of trails is connected along the lake shore, for some 100 km of off-road paved trails.

=== Tributaries ===
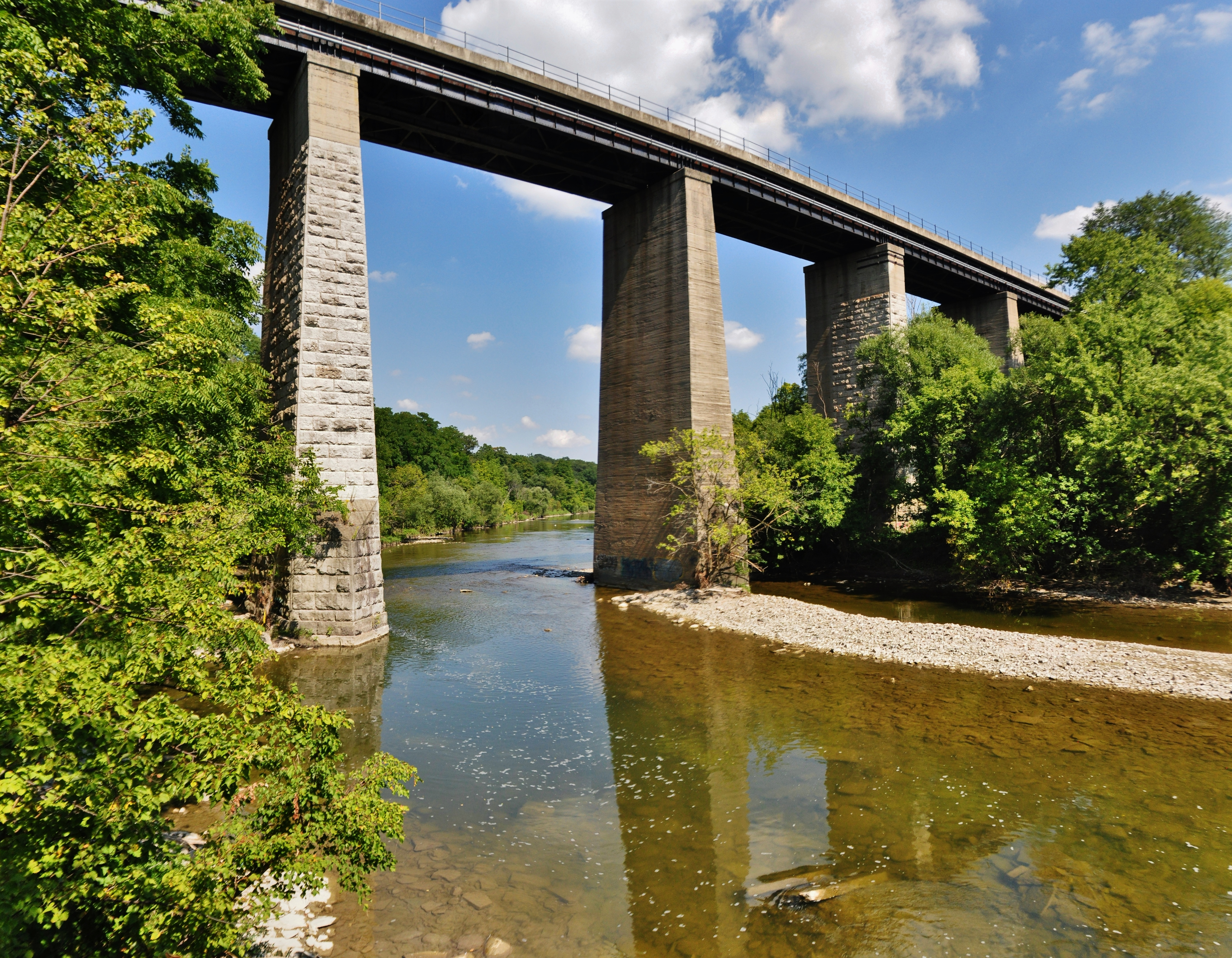
Railway bridge over the Humber River

- Albion Creek - The Albion Creek is a tributary of the West Humber. It flows south-west from east of Bolton, meeting the West Humber from the north, between Islington Avenue and Martin Grove Road. It is approximately 9 km long.
- Berry Creek - Berry Creek originates at Martin Grove Road just north of Rexdale Boulevard. It flows south-east to meet the main Humber from the west, west of the intersection of Albion Road and Weston Road, where Albion Road crosses the Humber. It is about 3.8 km long.
- Black Creek - The Black Creek originates north of Toronto in Vaughan and meanders southerly to meet the lower Humber from the east about 800 m north of Dundas Street, in Lambton Golf and Country Club, James Gardens occupies the opposite bank of the river.
- Centreville Creek
- East Humber - The East Humber flows from north of Toronto, meeting the main branch of the Humber in Woodbridge, just north of Highway 7. Its watershed extends east to Yonge Street and north to King City. Its source is Wilcox Lake and its wetlands east of Yonge Street and the village of Oak Ridges.
- Emery Creek - Emery Creek flows from its source west of Finch Avenue and Weston Road, south to meet the main Humber 500 metres west of Weston Road, about 1 km south of Finch Avenue. It is about 2.4 km long.
- Humber Creek - The Humber Creek runs south east, from its source near Islington Avenue and Dixon Road through residential areas, meeting the lower Humber from the west about 750 metres north of Eglinton Avenue. It is about 3.8 km long.
- King Creek - King Creek is a tributary of the East Humber. It flows southerly from near Highway 27 and 16th Side Road to meet the East Humber south of King Road, east of Nobleton. The settlement of King Creek is located to the east of the confluence.
- Purpleville Creek
- Rainbow Creek
- Salt Creek
- Silver Creek - The Silver Creek runs south-westerly from its source about 300 metres west of Eglinton Avenue and Royal York Road, partly within a golf course, through residential areas to meet the lower Humber from the west about 1.2 km south of Eglinton Avenue. It is about 2 km long.
- West Humber - The West Humber meets the main branch of the Humber east of Albion Road and about 800 metres west of Sheppard Avenue and Weston Road. The West Humber itself has several branches flowing from north-west of Toronto.

Source: Toronto and Region Conservation Authority, The Atlas of Canada.

== See also ==
- Étienne Brûlé Park
- Etobicoke
- Humber Bay Arch Bridge
- Humber Valley Village
- Lambton Mills
- List of rivers of Ontario
- Weston
