= Fort Oswego =

18th-century trading post in the Great Lakes region in North America

Coordinates: 43°27′42″N 76°30′51″W

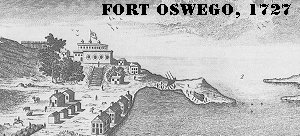
Fort Oswego in 1727

Fort Oswego was an 18th-century trading post in the Great Lakes region in North America, which became the site of a battle between French and British forces in 1756 during the North American phase of the Seven Years' War known as the French and Indian War. The fort was established in 1727, on the orders of New York governor William Burnet, adjacent to a 1722 blockhouse that had originally been a way station for French traders. The log palisade fort established a British presence on the Great Lakes.

In 1756, the fort's garrison, consisting of British Army troops from the 50th and 51st Foot were besieged by a combined French and Native American force. The garrison, after suffering 150 casualties, surrendered. The French took a 1,700 soldiers and civilians prisoner, and destroyed the fort itself. The site is now included in the city of Oswego, New York. To the French, the fort was called Fort Chouaguen.

== Oswego fortification system ==
Many historic references to Fort Oswego actually refer to other forts that existed simultaneously or later. The terrain at the site explains this. The original fort was built around the trading post on the lower ground on the north west side of the mouth of the Oswego River. This was convenient to canoe and bateaux traffic. A stone blockhouse was added in 1727, and was called Fort Burnet. A triangular stone wall, ten feet (3 m) high and three feet (1 m) wide was added in 1741, and the entire enclosure was called Fort Pepperrell (a marker can be found designating the area of Fort Oswego on the north west side of the river along a sidewalk). Besides these expansions, Fort Ontario was started in 1755 as a palisade on the high ground on the north east side of the river, and Fort George was added to the bluff located a half mile (800 m) to the southwest from Fort Oswego. Fort George was also called Fort Rascal or the West Fort. Fort Ontario was also known as the Fort of the Six Nations or the East Fort. The French knew Fort Oswego as Fort Chouaguen. Some references to Fort Oswego refer to the entire complex. Except for the marker in Oswego, nothing is left of Fort Oswego itself.

Fort Ontario has been rebuilt several times on or around the original fort and was given up by the U.S. Army in the 1940s. The fort is currently being taken care of by New York State Parks and Historic Preservation and is opened to the public.

== French and Indian War ==
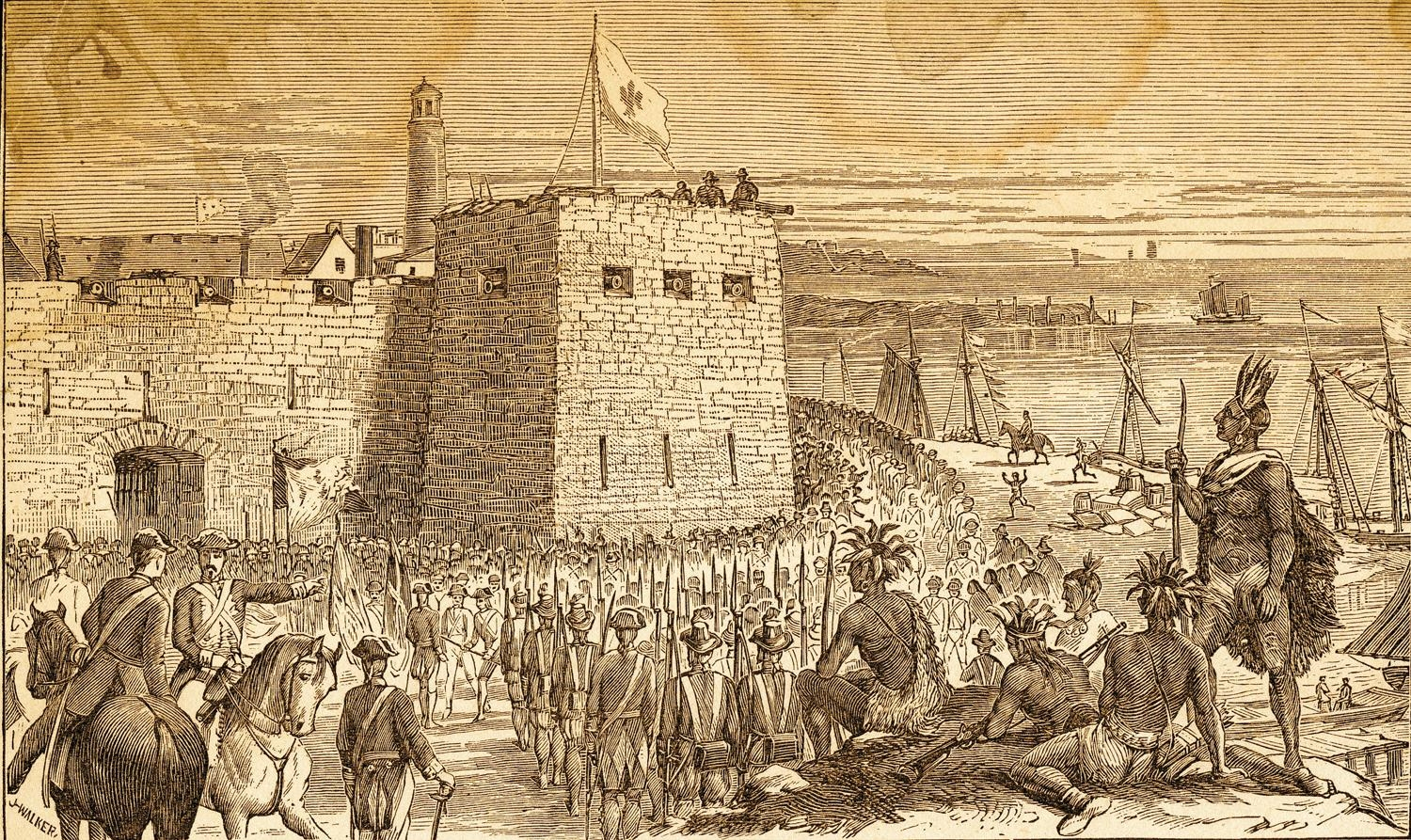
Capitulation of Fort Oswego, August 1756

During the French and Indian War, the French commander, General Montcalm, arrived in August with 3,000 men. His force included three regiments of regulars, several companies of Canadian militia, and numerous Indians. He first captured Fort Ontario, then began the assault on Fort Oswego. Oswego was the stronger fortification, but it was now downhill from 120 cannons in the abandoned Fort Ontario. Montcalm swept the fort with cannon fire, killing the British commander, Colonel Mercer, in the bombardment. British forces were forced to surrender on August 15, 1756.

Montcalm gave much of the British supplies to his Indian allies, and destroyed the fort. He returned to Quebec in triumph with 1,700 prisoners. His actions made a strong impression on the Indian allies of the British, and caused the Oneida and the Seneca tribes to switch to the French side.

== Later actions ==
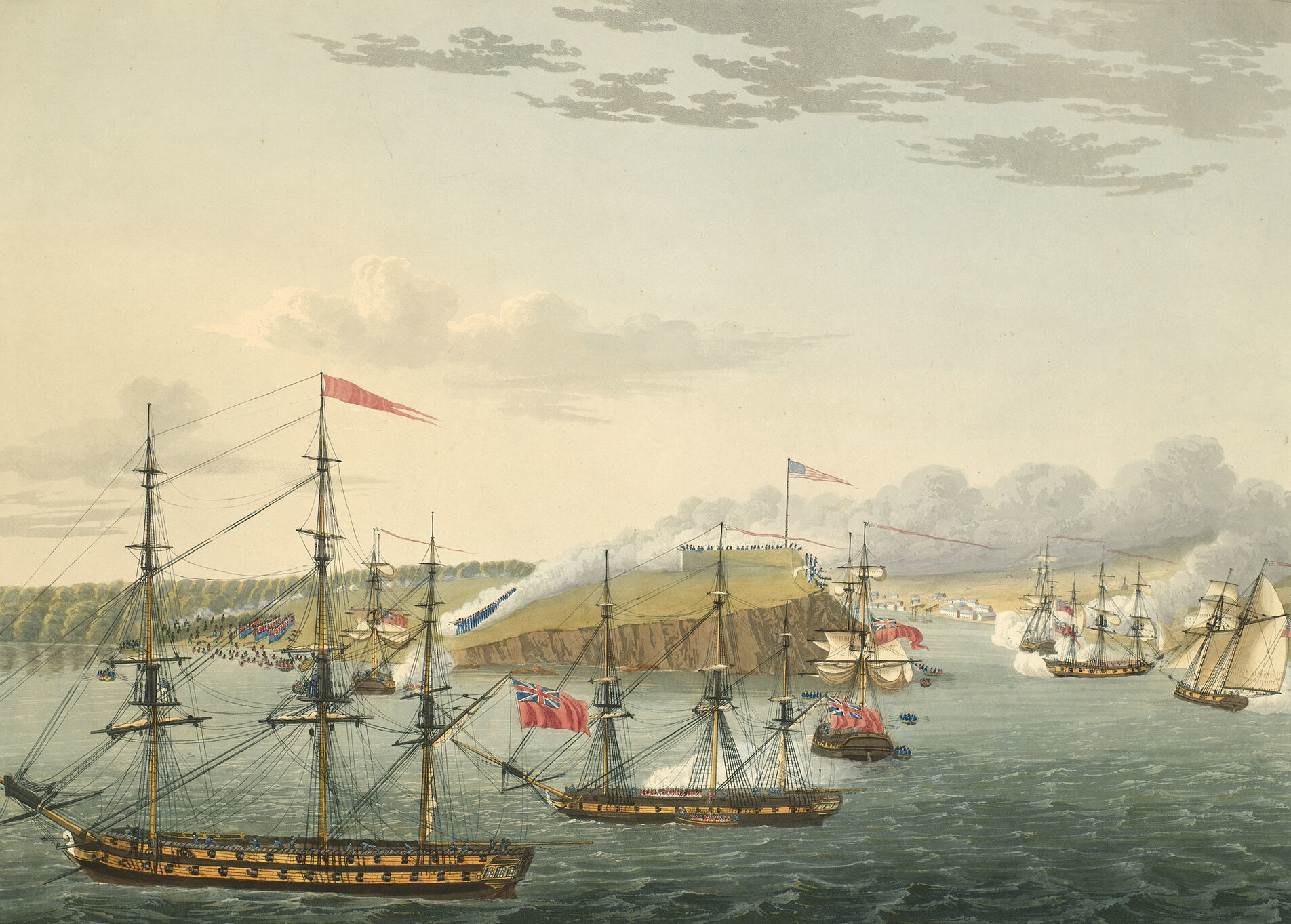
Attack on Fort Oswego (May 1814), War of 1812

The site was used for shore batteries in the Revolutionary War and the War of 1812 (when it was subjected to a successful British raid), but was never again fortified. Revolutionary War references to Fort Oswego are actually referring to Fort Ontario. The original site is commemorated at West First and Lake Street in Oswego, New York. Fort George was located in what is now Montcalm Park. Fort Ontario was used as a training site in World War I and World War II.
