= The Queensway–Humber Bay =

- Neighbourhood
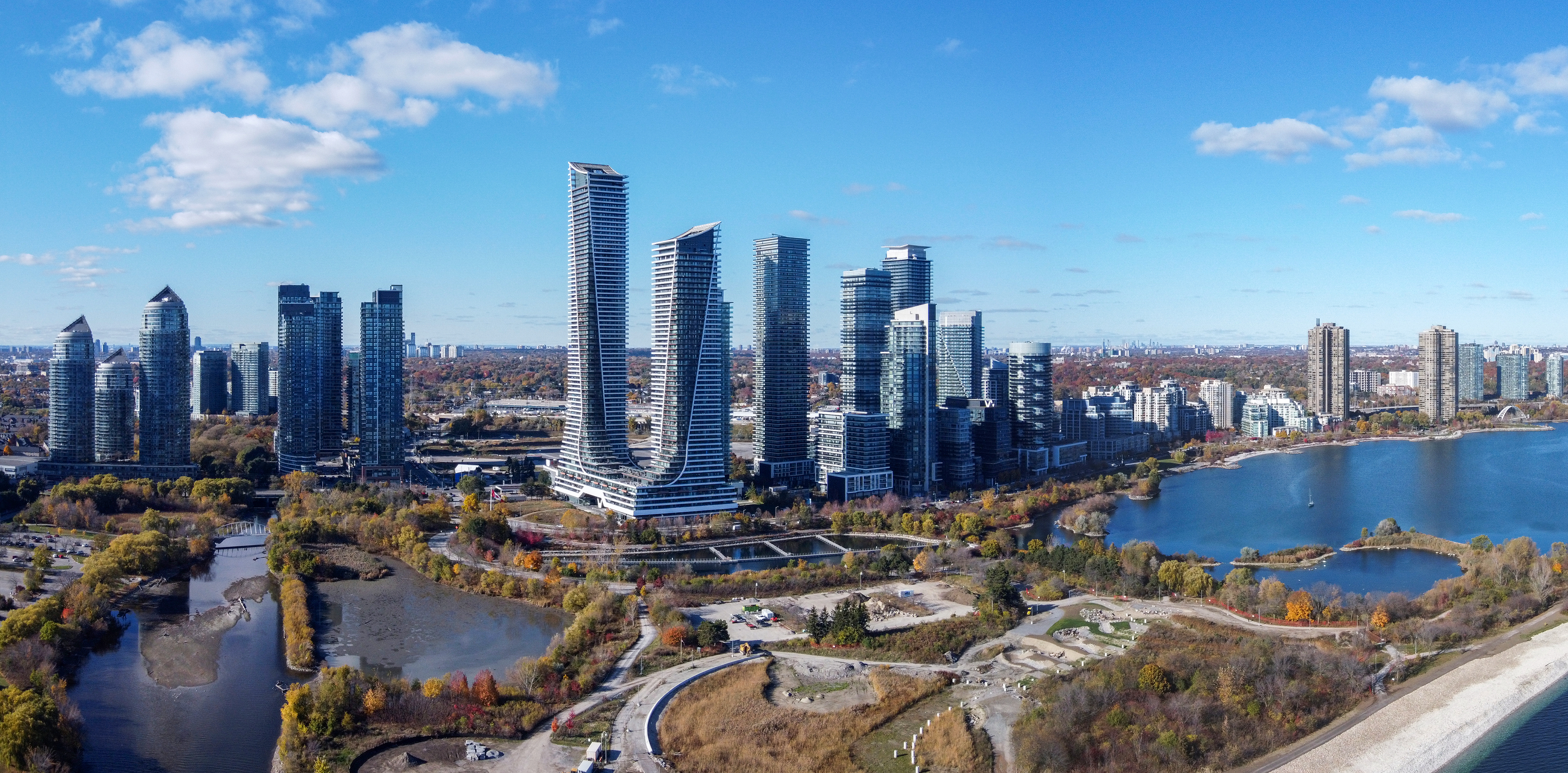
- Condominiums north of Humber Bay Park in 2024

- Location within Toronto
- Coordinates: 43°37′49″N 79°29′03″W
- Country: Canada
- Province: Ontario
- City: Toronto
- Community: Etobicoke–York
- Established: 1883 (Subdivision); 1890 (Postal village) 'Humber'; 1890 (Postal village) 'Queensway'
- Changed municipality: 1998 Toronto from Etobicoke

Government
  - MP: James Maloney (Etobicoke—Lakeshore)
  - MPP: Lee Fairclough (Etobicoke—Lakeshore)
  - Councillor: Amber Morley (Ward 3 Etobicoke—Lakeshore)

The Queensway–Humber Bay, known officially as Stonegate–Queensway, is a neighbourhood in the southwest of Toronto, Ontario, Canada. It is located in the southeast area of the former City of Etobicoke.

== Neighbourhood ==
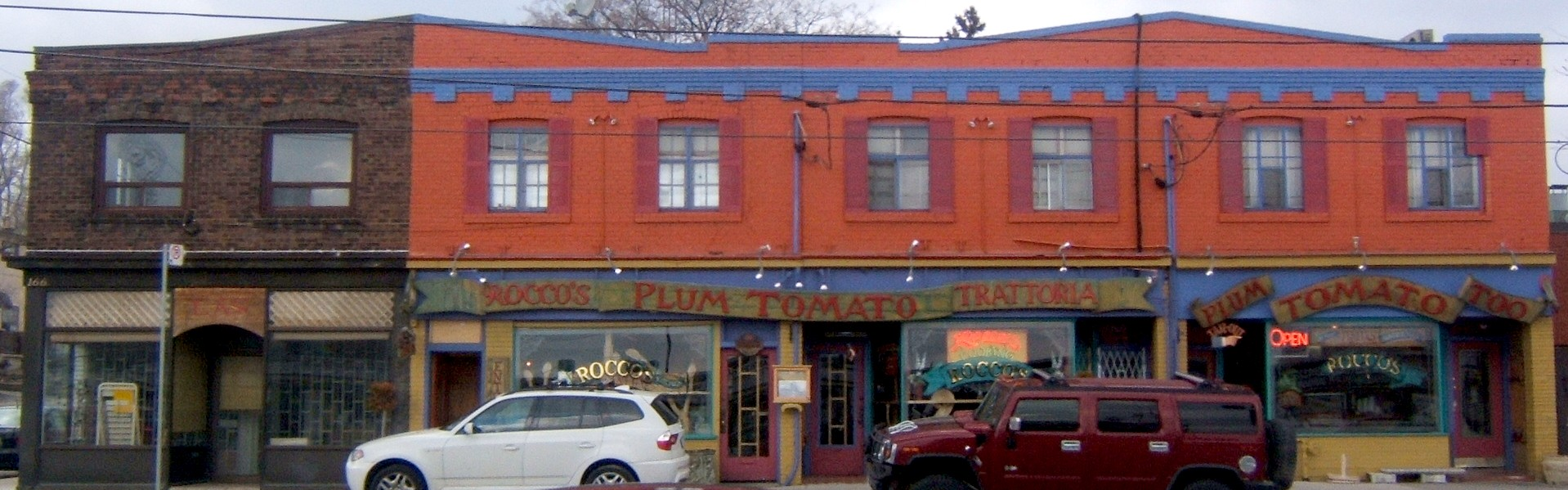
Business along the Queensway. A community bearing the same name has developed around the roadway.

This neighbourhood originally centred on the intersection of Lake Shore Boulevard and the Queensway near the mouth of the Humber River, however that intersection disappeared with the building of the Queen Elizabeth Way. The area to the south of the Gardiner Expressway is today part of Mimico neighbourhood. Today, the official neighbourhood is composed of two areas:

- The Queensway: It extends north from the Gardiner Expressway south of Norseman street. There is a residential area in the centre-east with industrial land and new big box stores further to the west.
- Sunnylea: Formerly the "Humber" postal village, it originally referred to the area around the old intersection of what is now the Queensway and what is now Lake Shore Boulevard at the Humber River. Sunnylea is now to the north of Norseman Street and Berry Road, south of Bloor Street and west of the Humber River. It is a residential area with a few bridges between Mimico Creek and the Humber River from Lake Ontario north to Glenroy Avenue (south of Park Lawn cemetery). There is commercial strips in this neighbourhood along Bloor Street West and portions of the Queensway and Berry Road.

=== Character ===
This community is mainly made up single-family homes, low-rise apartment buildings, and an old turn-of-the century market garden community that was absorbed by the city as it grew. There is little traffic and amenities in the area are along the Queensway, Bloor Street to the north, and Stonegate Plaza. The southeast portion of the neighbourhood has a high population of European immigrants.

Most streets formerly south of the Queensway east of the Mimico Creek were lost when the QEW was built. However, along the waterfront, a new street has been built on largely artificial shoreline named Marine Parade after a similar 1890s street planned to run along Mimico's shoreline. Some streets laid out in developments for returning soldiers carry names commemorating military men such as: Hornell (war hero born in Mimico), Saunders, Clive and Cochrane (formerly Churchill). Other streets laid out in the following years celebrate the coronation of Queen Elizabeth II such as: the Queensway and Lillibet Rd. Many streets in the Sunnylea neighbourhood north of Berry Road are entirely new, such as: Sunnydale, Kinsdale and Heatherdale.

== History ==
=== King's Mill Reserve ===
After the fall of New France to the British, a French trader Jean-Bonaventure Rousseau received permission from the British administration to settle with his family on the site of the second French Fort in Toronto (at the foot of the Humber River). When the Simcoes arrived from Newark (Niagara-on-the-Lake) with several hundred Queen's Rangers (Loyalist soldiers), his son Jean Baptiste Rousseau guided the ships into Toronto Bay (now Toronto Inner Harbour). John Graves Simcoe renamed the Toronto River the Humber after the Humber River in England. When land in the area was surveyed and divided into lots, the area on both side of the Humber River was reserved by the government for timber and Jean Baptiste Rousseau was offered land on the west (Etobicoke) side in what is now the Humber Bay neighbourhood. Rousseau refused to relocate from one side of the river and he left to resettle near Hamilton where he was given land in compensation. The Kings Mill Reserve was that part of the original forest that covered Toronto that was preserved rather than cleared for farms. The Kings Mill (Old Mill) is at Bloor north of this neighbourhood but the reserve stretched south to what is now the Queensway covering most of modern Humber Bay's residential district. The Kings Mill reserve was commemorated in this neighbourhood by the Kitzler Vocational Collegiate (now Bishop Allen Academy) which was actually on the west side of the Mimico Creek in the Queensway.

=== Early hotels on the Lake Shore ===
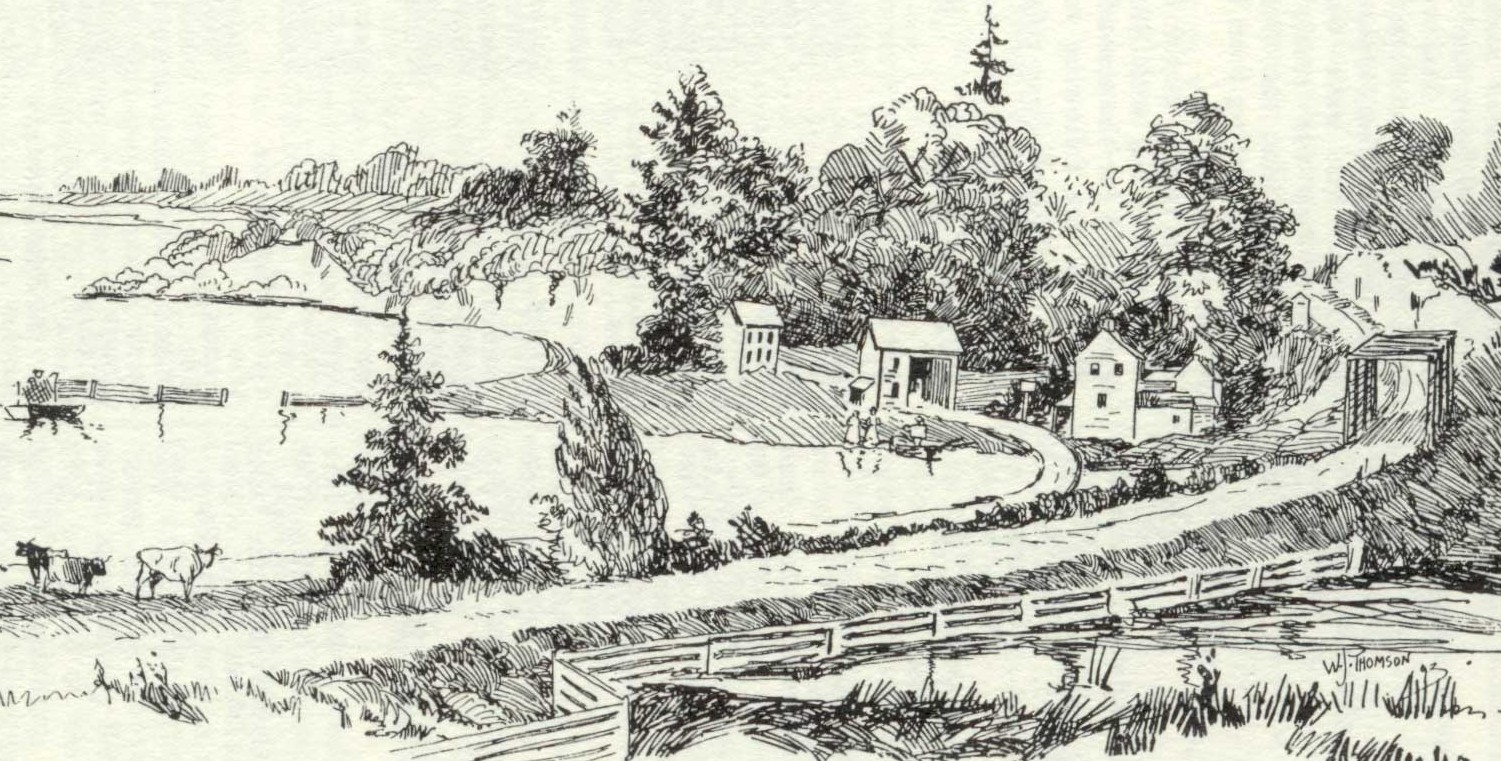
Depiction of Lake Shore Boulevard and the Queensway, c. 1870. Prior to the construction of bridges, a ferry was operated to transport travellers on the mouth of the Humber River.

Etobicoke's first highway was Dundas Street (Toronto to the town of Dundas beside Hamilton) but for most early settlers of southern Etobicoke, an Indian path along the shoreline given the name Lake Road (Lake Shore Boulevard West) was found to be a more convenient street. This street extended into Toronto from where Queen street stopped at the bottom of Keele St (Parkside) around the top of Humber Bay to the border of Etobicoke (the Humber River) where it met with the extension of Queen Street in Etobicoke (Stock's Side Road). As bridges were only built on Ontario's important highways at first (Dundas St, Kingston Rd., Yonge St.) a ferry was operated at the end of the Humber River. After the first bridge was built at the end of the Humber and a toll opened (to pay for the bridge), the intersection here became the first community in Etobicoke south of Dundas centring on three early Hotels and a wharf. North of this area were government reserves (forest left intact for lumber). There was also a notable jog in what would become Royal York where it meets the Mimico Creek crossing the creek to the east where there remains a footbridge today just north of Norseman St., north on today's Humbervale Boulevard and back west along what is now Glenroy Avenue. In 1855, Ontario's first railway the Grand Trunk Railway's line between Hamilton and Toronto was built through southern Humber Bay between Lake Shore and Stock's Side Road (the Queensway) passing over the latter just west of the intersection of these streets at the Humber River. A 'Humber Station' is marked between Lake Shore and Stock's Side Road (the Queensway) near the intersection and a 'Grove Stop' is marked where the railway passes over Salisbury (Park Lawn) into what became Mimico in the 1850s.

=== Subdivision ===
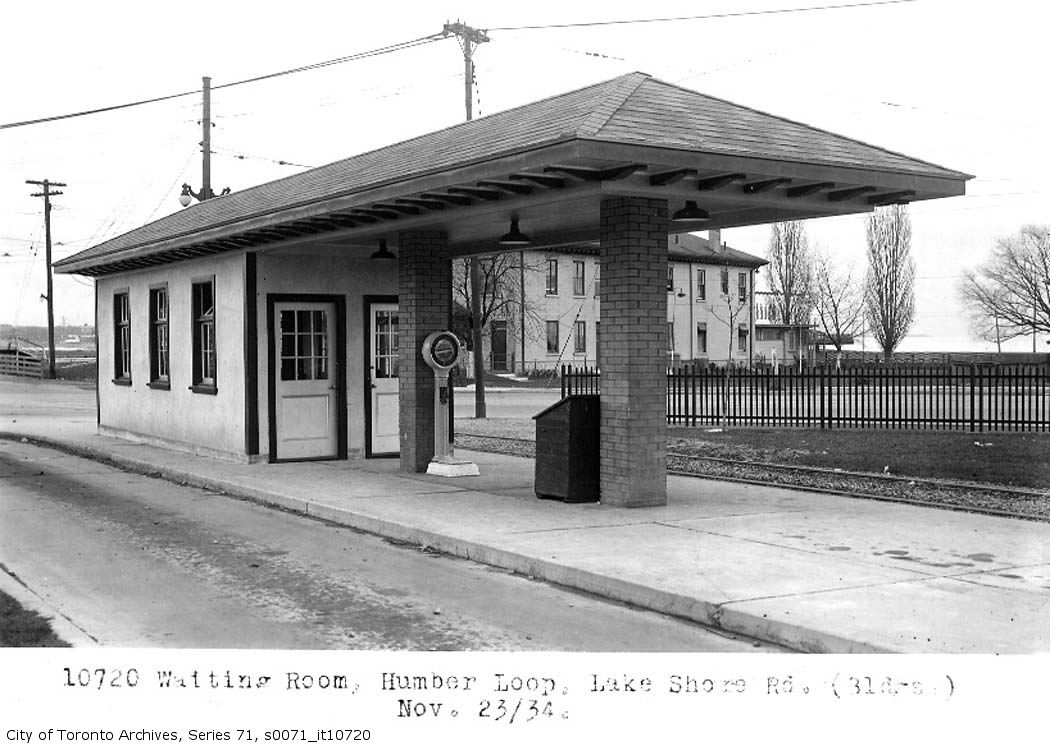
Humber Loop station, c. 1934. Toronto streetcar system has operated in the area since the 1920s.

In 1883, Mr. Davidson, a businessman from the United States, imported about 40 small prefabricated houses most of which were placed on Davidson Crescent (now gone) between Stock's Side Rd (the Queensway) and Lake Shore which formed a small artistic community. A subdivision plan was also prepared that year for residential streets north of the future Queensway. In the 1890 subdivision of Mimico, Humber Bay was still shown as being within that growing village. By 1926, the area between Lake Shore, Stock's Side Rd (the Queensway) and Salisbury (Park Lawn) was subdivided with a number of homes being built on the last street. Some homes had also been built on the south side along the Lake Shore between the Humber and Salisbury (Park Lawn). Several of the first churches and the first school use Davidson Houses. At the intersection of Lake Shore and what would become the Queensway, the Lake Shore streetcar line was built through with its own bridge and a camping ground was set up by one of the old hotels. The Humber Bay School and the St. James Anglican Church moved out of Davidson houses when new buildings were built on High Street in the subdivision north of what would become the Queensway. Humber Bay became a Postal District. More churches were soon built in Humber Bay including a LDS Church. By about 1890 Humber Bay became a postal village with the opening of the Humber Bay Post Office on the south side of what would become the Queensway between Davidson Crescent and the intersection with Lake Shore.

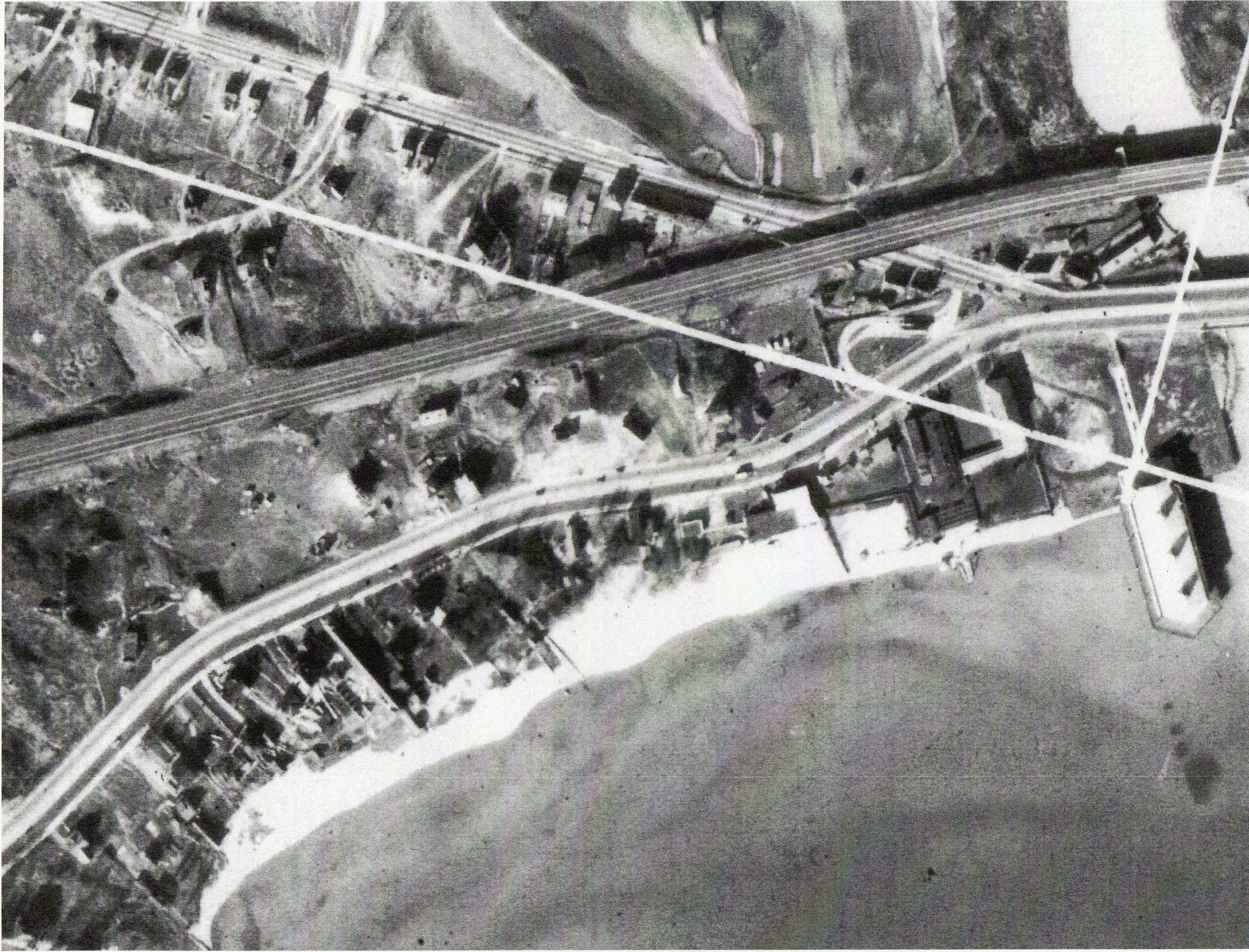
An aerial photograph from 1936 showing the construction for The Palace Pier. Opened in 1941, the pier served as a dance hall.

With the advent of the car, the area changed beyond recognition. At the intersection of Lake Shore and the future Queensway, the wharf into lake Ontario was replaced with a Dance Hall on a Pier called the Palace Pier, modelled after the Brighton Pier in England. The land south of Lake Shore along the shoreline was filled with motels for motorists arriving in Toronto along the Toronto-Hamilton Highway (Lake Shore). North of what would become the Queensway between the subdivision and the Humber a Golf Course was built and further north around Glenroy Avenue a school was built named Sunnylea in a competition. Along the Queensway, many single storey homes were built. Just before the Second World War the first lighted limited access highway in North America connecting Hamilton with Toronto, the Queen Elizabeth Way, was opened. This replaced the Lake Shore as the major highway to the west of Toronto but it's Toronto end with the large QEW monument was at the intersection of the Queensway and Lake Shore. The building of the QEW involved the demolition of many of the buildings between the future Queensway and Lake Shore and cut off the 'Motel Strip' from the Humber Bay neighbourhood to the north. West of Mimico Creek, the Highway cut the Queensway off from Mimico. The old intersection at the future Queensway and Lake Shore disappeared. Although the other Etobicoke neighbourhoods along the Lake Shore left Etobicoke in this period, the splitting of the Humber Bay neighbourhood by the QEW prevented this neighbourhood from developing into a separate municipality.

=== Post-war years ===
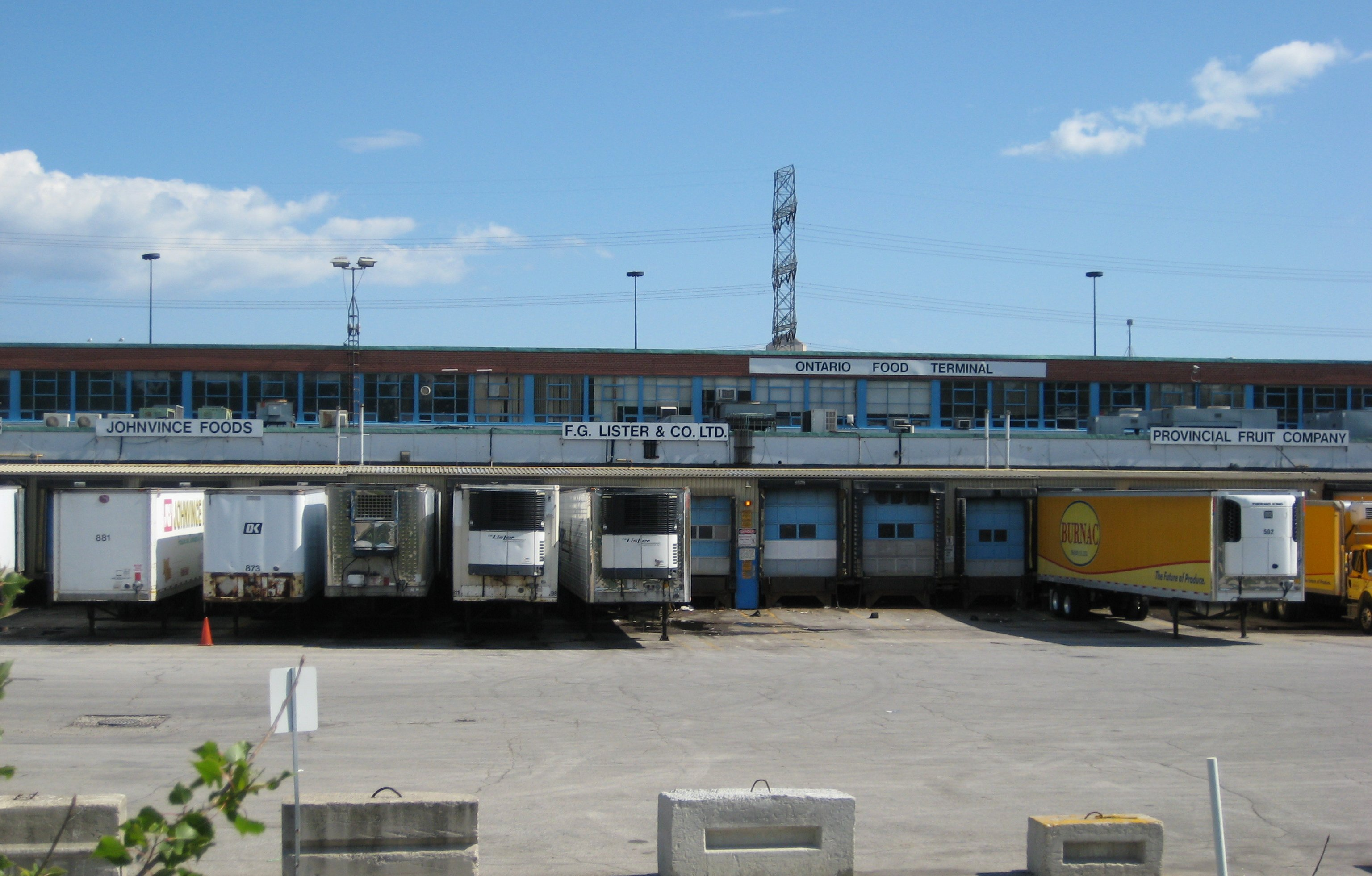
The Ontario Food Terminal was opened in 1954 and serves as the main produce distribution centre for Toronto.

In 1952, Etobicoke left York County with the other municipalities south of Steeles Ave to join the new Metropolitan Toronto which began to urbanise the townships around Toronto like Etobicoke. In 1946, the 'Queensway' post office opened and at the Queensway and Royal York a development of 'veterans houses' was built for returning servicemen. In the 1950s, Toronto was expanding and Queen Street West was extended from the foot of Roncesvalles Avenue around the top of Humber Bay north of the Railway tracks complementing the Lake Shore to the south and linking with the former Stock's Side Road. With the accession of Queen Elizabeth in 1952, this street was named the Queensway also to be consistent with Queen Street to the west and the Kingsway to the north. Many immigrants arrived in the post-war years and the large northern parts of this neighbourhood were largely developed between Islington and the Mimico Creek where many new streets were laid out. North of the Queensway many apartments were built east of Stephen Drive. With the development of residential to the north, the old heart of the community south of the Queensway between the Humber River and the Mimico Creek became industrial with the arrival of the Ontario Food Terminal north of the QEW and Christie's Factory to the south. North of the Queensway the Golf Course became a sewage treatment plant. The Palace Pier was lost to a fire set by arsonists. In 1954, Hurricane Hazel devastated the Humber Valley and Humber Bay was one of the worst-hit areas, however because of the loss of so much of the residential area around the old Lake Shore/Queensway intersection, the damage was largely to city infrastructure notably destroying the Lake Shore and Royal York bridges over the Mimico Creek and damaging the Lake Shore Bridge over the Humber.

=== "Motel Strip" ===
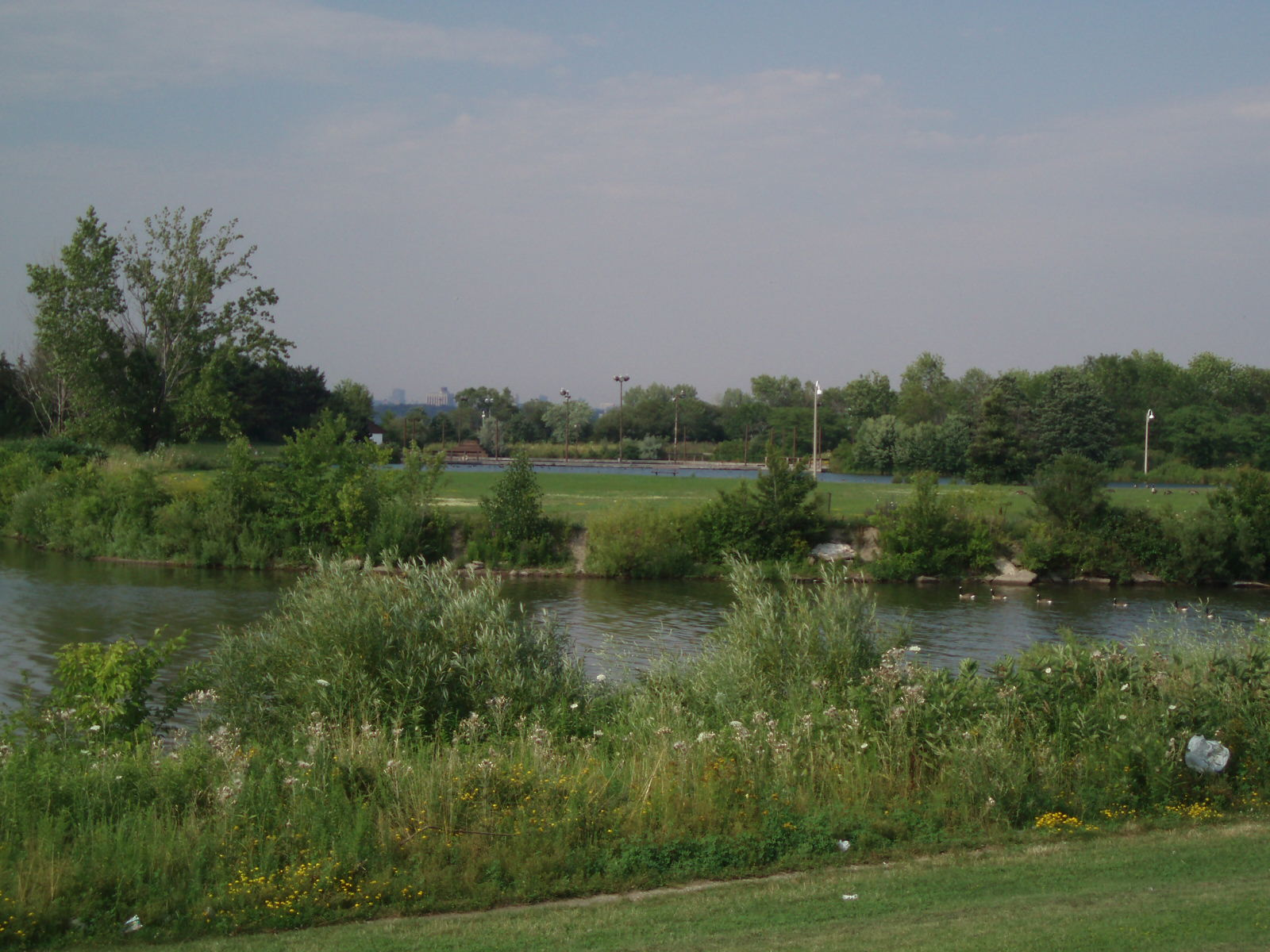
Established in 1984, Humber Bay Park is a municipal park situated along the Humber Bay.

Etobicoke became a Borough and was reunited with Mimico, New Toronto, and Long Branch. With city highway expansion plans the City of Toronto extended the Provincial Queen Elizabeth Highway into the City of Toronto with the building of the Gardiner Expressway along the top of Humber Bay. The former intersection at the Humber River with the Queensway and Lake Shore was no long an intersection with three heavy traffic bridges crossing the river (the QEW, the Queensway and Lake Shore) as well as the Railway. The motel strip was already in decline prompting city plans for the redevelopment of the area along the Lake Shore. Humber Bay Park was built at this time, two artificial peninsulas extending east (along Humber's waterfront) and west (along Mimico's waterfront) from the bottom of the Mimico Creek. With a decline in the number of immigrants arriving and an ageing population and the introduction of full funding for Separate (Catholic) Schools several area Public Schools were given to the Separate School Board which became Bishop Allen Academy and St. Felix Junior School (the only Catholic Junior school in Etobicoke), later École Sainte-Marguerite d'Youville. Sunnylea Public School was leased to the Separate (Catholic) School Board as Cardinal Slipyj (Eastern Rite Catholic) Elementary School for a short time. The Humber streetcar loop at the former intersection of the Queensway and Lake Shore also declined as the Long Branch car which had turned there was combined with the Queen car and the Queensway bus was continued along the Queensway into Toronto. As growth in the residential neighbourhoods to the east stagnated, the non residential area west of Kipling along the Queensway experienced rapid growth with the building of Sherway Gardens, one of the largest malls in Toronto.

=== Redevelopment ===
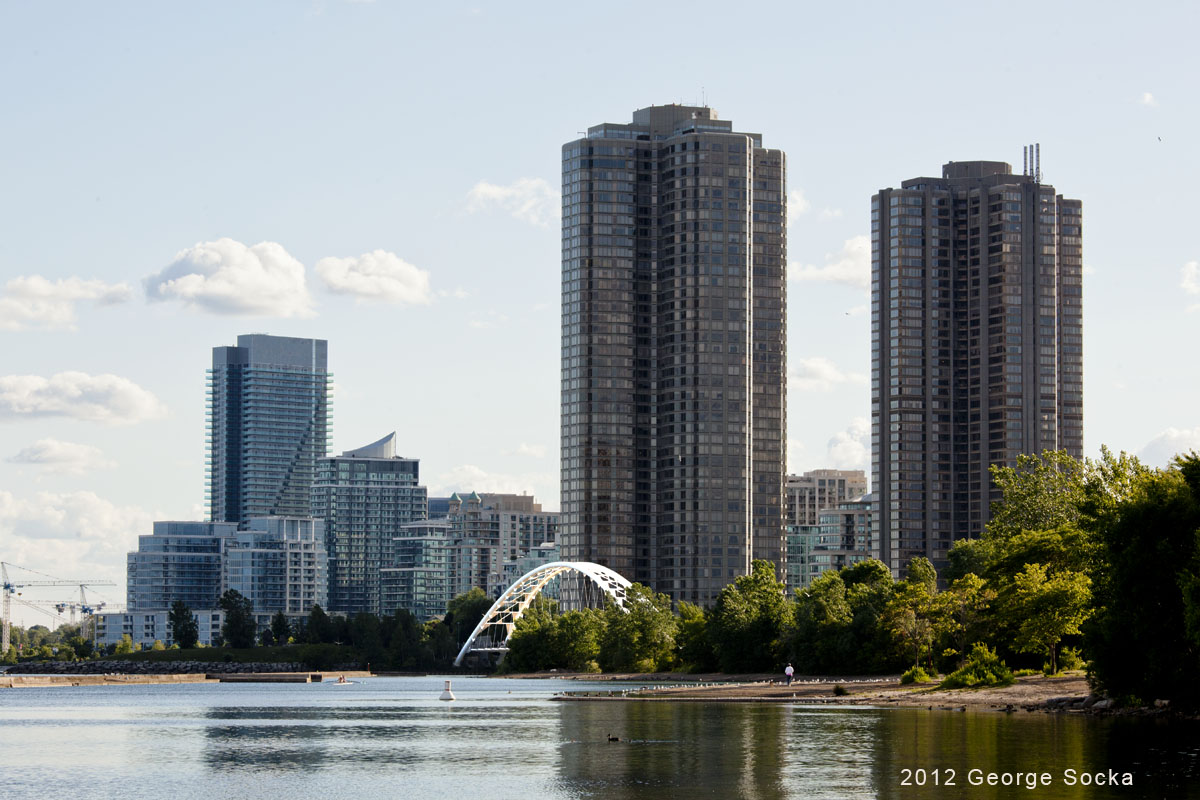
The end of the 20th century saw the construction of a number condominiums along the former motel strip.

In 1984, Etobicoke became a city and began planning to redevelop the southern neighbourhoods. Since the 1980s some undeveloped areas have been built up with 'Monster Homes' and more recently townhouses such as on Royal York south from Norseman and on Berry Rd at Prince Edward Dr. The former site of Davidson crescent between the Humber streetcar loop and the Ontario Food Court became home to a large big box stores complex. Far to the west from Kipling to the 427 many new stores have opened and west of the 427 the former industrial has continued to be turned to commercial use with the building of many big box stores around the Sherway Gardens mall. In recent years the area south of the Lake Shore has been almost entirely redeveloped with the demolition of almost all the motels and the building of many tall condominiums. This had originally begun with two towers built in the 1980s at the foot of the Humber River and were named The Palace Pier after the amusement pier that had been lost to arson. An artificial shoreline has also been created as parkland behind the new condominiums from Lake Shore. The TTC has recently considered reinstating the Long Branch streetcar which would necessitate passengers switching at the Humber Loop again, going or coming from Toronto. Proposals have also been made for a streetcar along the Queensway as an attempt to slow traffic and attempt to remove the 'suburban' feel of the area.

== Education ==
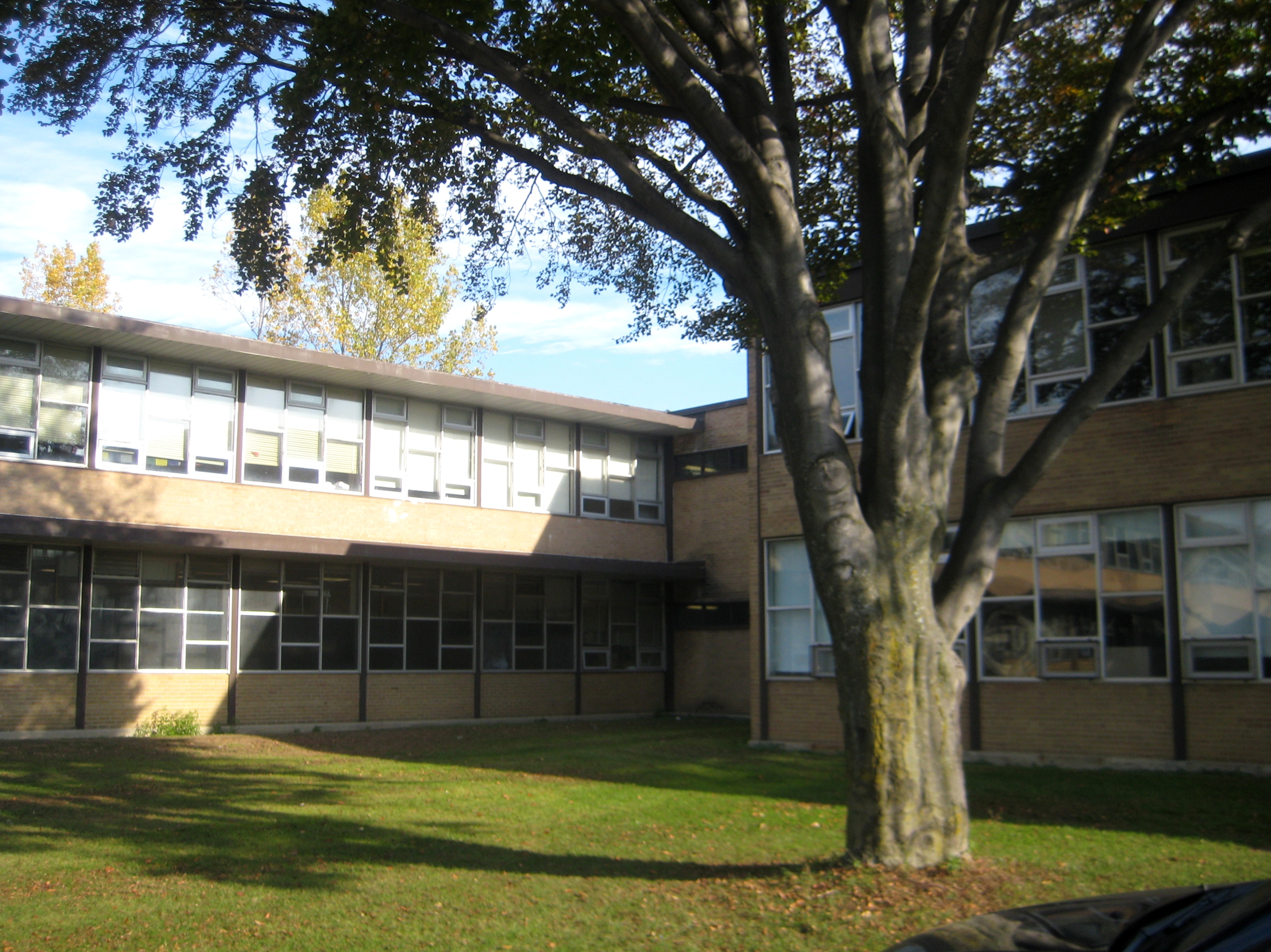
The Etobicoke School of the Arts is a secondary school situated in the neighbourhood.

Three public school boards operate elementary schools and secondary schools in the area, the Conseil scolaire catholique MonAvenir, the Toronto Catholic District School Board (TCDSB), and the Toronto District School Board (TDSB). Elementary and middle schools operated by the three school boards include:

- École Sainte-Marguerite d'Youville, formerly St. Felix Catholic School (CSCM)
- Etienne Brulé Junior School (TDSB)
- Holy Angels Separate Elementary School (TCDSB)
- Norseman Junior Middle School (TDSB)
- Park Lawn Junior and Middle School (TDSB)
- Queensway Middle School (TDSB) (1912–1969)
- St Mark's Elementary School (TDSB)
- Sunnylea Junior School (TDSB)

Only TCDSB and TDSB operate secondary schools in the area. Bishop Allen Academy is a secondary school operated by TCDSB, whereas the Etobicoke School of the Arts is a specialized arts-academic secondary school operated by TDSB. Both buildings were originally built as Kingsmill Secondary School in 1963 and Royal York Collegiate Institute in 1953 respectively. Kingsmill operated as a junior vocational school where as Royal York operated as an academic secondary school.

Since 1989, Bishop Allen Academy is served by the area in the Our Lady of Sorrows Parish, whose students attended Etobicoke's first high school in the Archdiocese Michael Power High School for boys and St. Joseph's High School, Islington for girls and is enrolled with 1700 students, making it the second largest high school in the board.

== Institutions ==
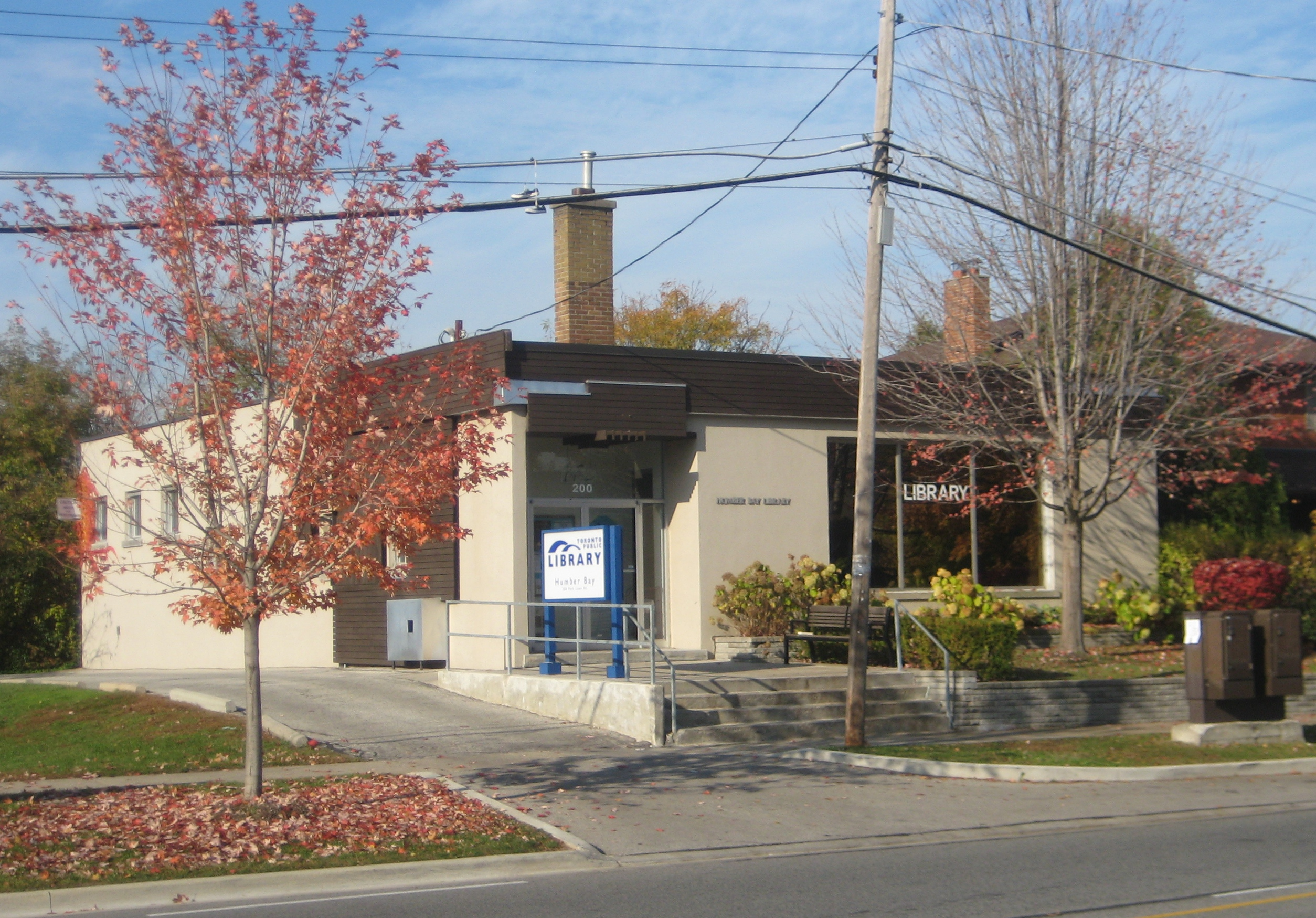
The Humber branch of the Toronto Public Library is situated in the neighbourhood.

- Humber Bay Library (Park Lawn)
- Ontario Food Terminal
- Humber Bay Waste Treatment Plant
- Stonegate Plaza
- Kipling-Queensway Mall
- Humber Bay Park (East)
- Humber Park
- Park Lawn Park
- Park Lawn Cemetery

=== Churches ===
- Queensway Cathedral (formerly Queensway Full Gospel Church)
- Christ Church St James Anglican Church
- St Mark's Roman Catholic Church (Humber Bay)
- Holy Angels Roman Catholic Church (Queensway)
- Church of the Transfiguration (Society of St Pius X)
- Queensway Baptist Church
- Park Lawn Baptist Church
- Humbervale Park Baptist Church

== Transportation ==
The area is accessible from the Bloor-Danforth subway by two bus routes: the route 66 bus from Old Mill station which travels along Prince Edward and Park Lawn, and the 80 Queensway bus route from Keele Station, along the lake shore, then along the Queensway to the Sherway Gardens mall. From the east the 501 Queen Street streetcar travels along the Queensway until the Humber, then switches south along Lake Shore Boulevard.

The Humber Loop is also situated within the neighbourhood. The Loop serves as a station and intermediate turning loop for streetcars on the 501 Queen line of the Toronto Transit Commission.
