= Jean Rousseau =

Jean Rousseau may refer to:

- Jean-Baptiste Rousseau (1671–1741), French dramatist and poet
- Jean Baptiste Rousseau (fur trader) (1758–1812), merchant and fur trader
- Jean-Jacques Rousseau (1712–1778), philosopher
- Jean-Loup Rousseau (born 1970), Tahitian international footballer
- Jean Rousseau (violist) (1644–1699), French musician
- Jean Rousseau (politician) (born 1961), Canadian Member of Parliament
- Jean Rousseau (politician, born 1738)
