= Octavius Hicks =

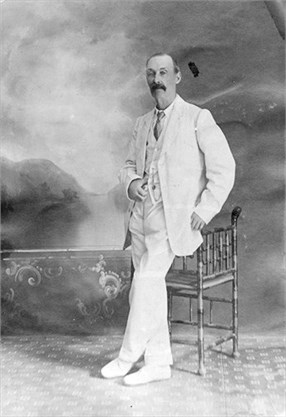
Octavius Laing Hicks, c. 1900

Octavius Laing Hicks (27 January 1852 – 23 December 1930) was a prominent citizen of Humber Bay in Etobicoke Township. He was born in Dundee, Scotland. He settled in Humber Bay in 1873 and remained there for the rest of his life.

He is best known as a builder of boats and bridges. His contracting business constructed bridges, and foundations. He was also an inventor, hotel owner, and brickmaker.

His best known patent was a sliding seat for racing sculls. He also patented a boat rudder which could be easily shipped or unshipped. 'The Flotilla' carousel formed from a ring of miniature boats was installed at High Park in 1894. In 1899, it was moved to Munro Park in eastern Toronto. His boathouse was on the Humber River, south of Lakeshore Road. Boats were built and rented at this location. Hicks saved several people from drowning. He once rented boats to the party of Governor General Lansdowne. In 1918, his boat livery became involved in legal dispute with the Toronto Board of Harbor Commissioners. The Board claimed jurisdiction over the Humber River, but Hicks disputed this. He managed to obtain the support of the York County Commissioners. Hicks took the matter to court but lost quickly because "the limits were set by the Department of Marine and Fisheries at Ottawa, and were not merely plan of the commissioners."

In 1873, he built a boathouse on the Humber River between Lakeshore Road and the G.T.R. tracks. The Royal Oak Hotel was located a little west. He purchased it from the widow of the hotel's builder in 1880. As a hotelier, he sometimes joined with owners of nearby hotels to jointly promote their businesses. Most ambitious was when he joined with John Duck (Wimbledon House), Charles Nurse (Nurse's Hotel) and the brewer Eugene O'Keefe to form the Humber Steam Ferry Co. For several years, this company operated two ships to carry excursionists from Toronto to the owners' hotels at the Humber River. To attract winter business Hicks and Duck constructed a racetrack on the river in winter 1888. Relations with Charles Nurse were sometimes strained. In 1887, Hicks brought a civil action for trespass against Nurse. He claimed that Nurse had improperly fenced in part of public right of way south of the Lakeshore Road. Hicks' complaint was upheld on appeal. The hotel apparently suspended operation around 1889 before reopening several years later under a new owner.

As a boatbuilder, he is best known for canoes with a torpedo stem. He also built sailing canoes, skiffs and power boats. The boat factory was located on the north side of Lakeshore Road to the west of the Humber Beach Hotel. In 1907, the boat livery was moved to the east side of the river between the G.T.R. and the Lakeshore Road. The boathouse moved back to the west bank south of Lakeshore Road in 1913. This final boathouse was demolished in 1930 to accommodate a widening of Lakeshore Road.

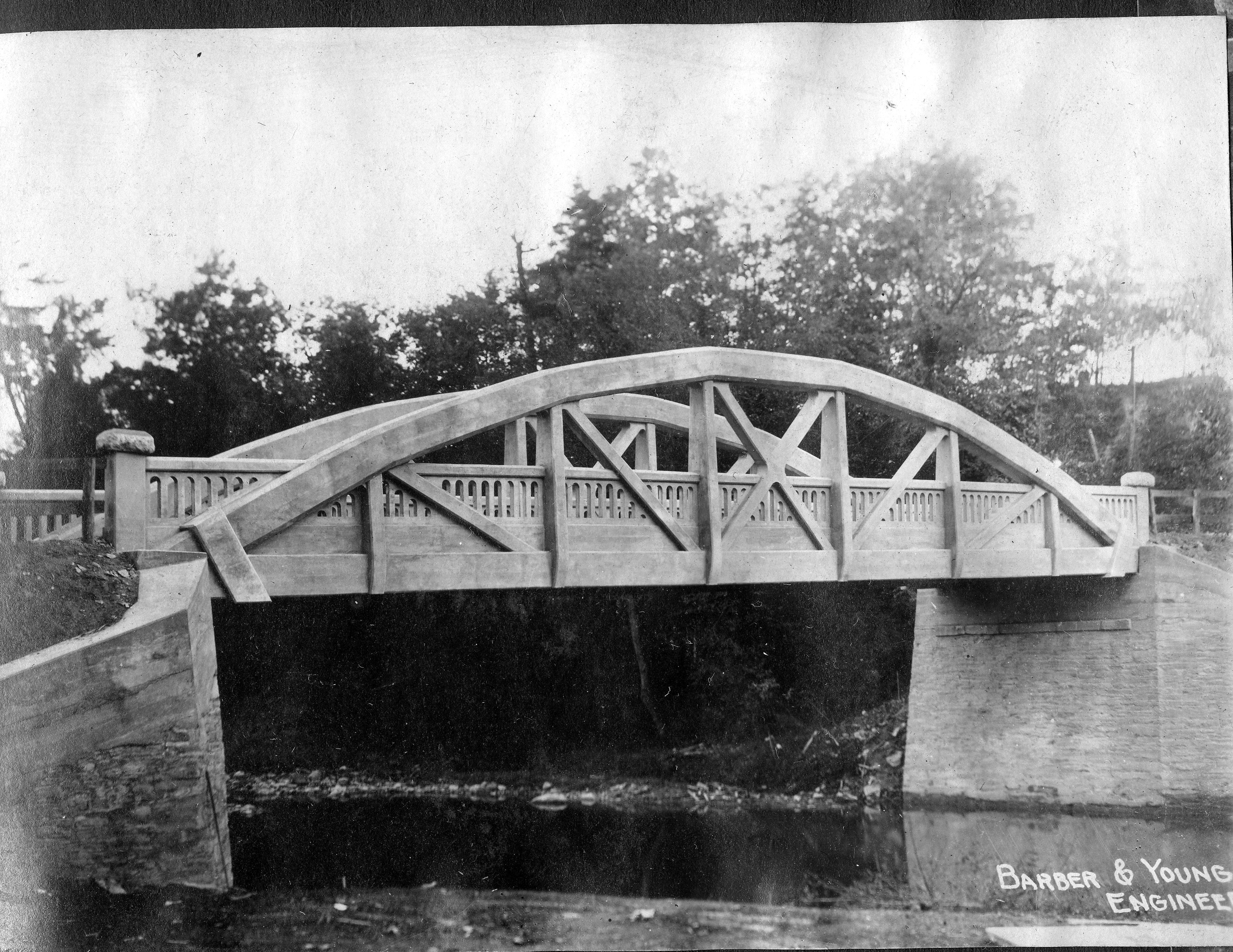
The Middle Road Bridge was the first concrete truss bridge built in Canada.

In spring 1885, he constructed a 400 ft iron pier for the Ferry Company at High Park. The construction was unusual in that it was supported by 53 screw piles. Storm-driven ice destroyed the pier in March 1887.

His contracting business built bridges and abutments. The firm also did more mundane work such as building a cinder path for bicyclists, earth moving, pile driving, and sand blasting. In 1904, his first commission was Musson's Bridge which carried the old Albion Road (now Flindon Road) over the Humber River. It was the first all-riveted steel bridge with a permanent floor. The eastern abutment of this bridge survives today. A bridge at Unionville was built in 1907 for Markham Township Council. Frank Barber claimed this was the first concrete beam bridge in York County. In 1909, he built the first concrete truss bridge in Canada. The exact type was a "parabolic bowstring truss". Two innovative techniques were used in construction of the bridge: "the rods were given considerable tension before the concrete was poured by an ingenious device of the contractor"; ice bags were left overnight on the fresh concrete so that courses poured on successive days would bond properly. In 1909, he received a contract from Vaughan Municipal Council to build a reinforced concrete bridge over the Humber River between Purpleville and Kleinburg. This bridge was located near the intersection of Teston Rd and Kipling Avenue. The arch bridge over the Holland River at Newmarket was built by Hicks and designed by Frank Barber. This 1909 railway bridge has been stripped of its approach embankments and preserved as a historic structure.

He was also a pioneer in foundation work. The engineer who designed the streetcar bridge over Mimico Creek considered the problem which beset the nearby Grand Trunk Railway bridge. The pilings of the abutment sank into the sand on the river bottom. Therefore, concrete abutments sitting on rock were specified. Hick's solution was to sink square concrete shells through twenty feet of sand. The shells sank as the inside sand was scooped out. The shells were then filled with concrete to yield bridge abutments. In 1906, he did the concrete work for the Toronto and York Radial Railway bridge over Etobicoke Creek. Hicks built the substructure of the Scarlett Road Bridge which was completed in November 1909.

Some contractors considered him to be a bold and luck speculator (for instance, in his contract on the Mimico abutments mentioned above.) The writer, however, knows that he never gambled on a contract or took an avoidable risk. He had always considered well his modes of construction and he was one of the most accurate estimators the writer has known.

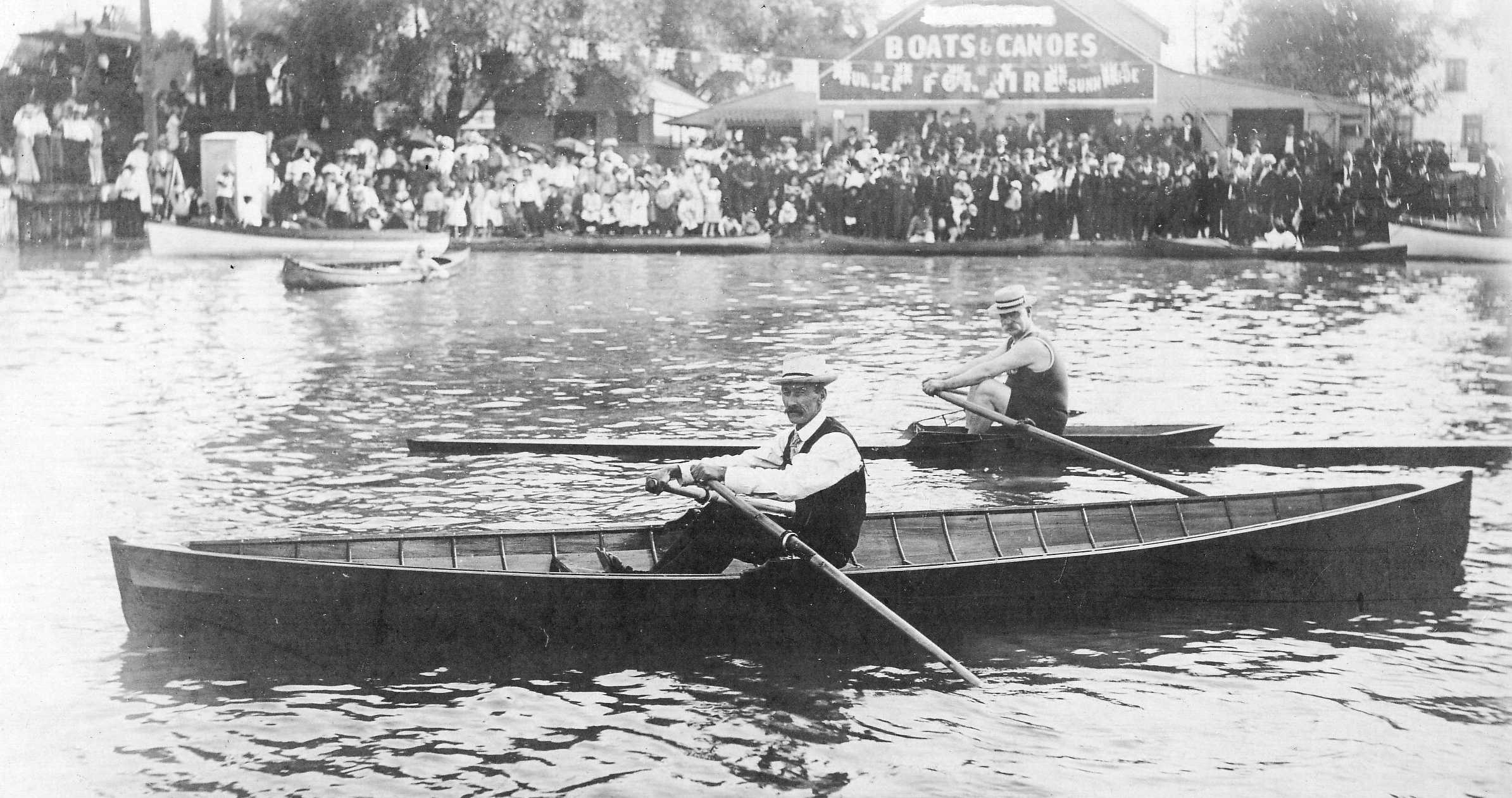
O.L. Hicks and Ned Hanlan on Humber River 1904

== Retirement ==
In 1911, he and his wife took a trip to the old country. The couple sailed their own cabin cruiser, Visitant, to Kingston and continued via steamer without any rail travel. 1913 is the last year in which Might's Directory Listed O L Hicks and Son as contractors. He continued to be listed as a boathouse operator until his son, W. H. Hicks took over in 1925.
