= Eugene O'Keefe =

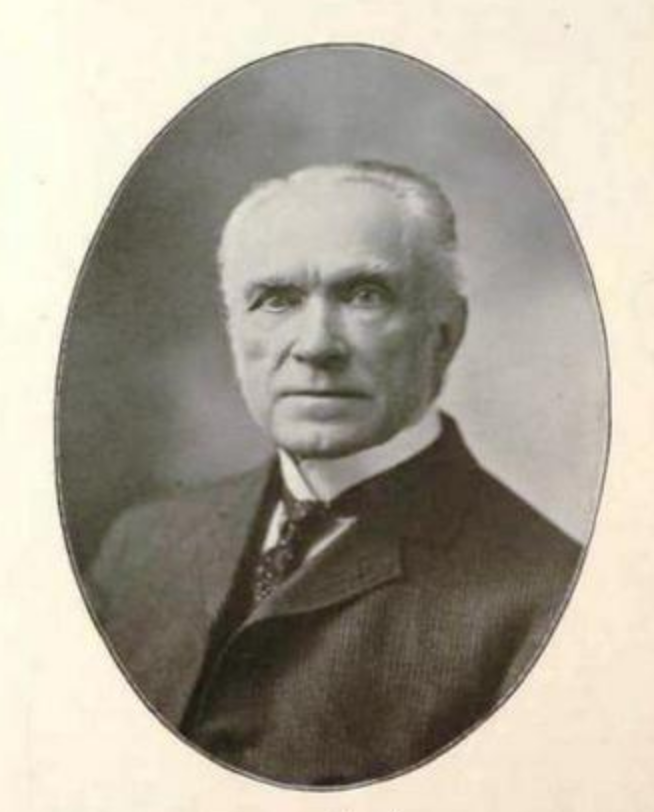
- Born: 10 December 1827; Bandon, County Cork
- Died: 1 October 1913 (aged 85); Toronto, Ontario
- Occupation(s): Businessman and philanthropist
- Known for: O'Keefe Brewery Company of Toronto Limited

Eugene O'Keefe (10 December 1827 – 1 October 1913), baptized as Owen Keeffe, was an Irish-born Canadian businessman and philanthropist, well-known in the brewing industry for his signature brews. He incorporated the O'Keefe Brewery Company of Toronto Limited in 1891.

== Life and career ==
Born in Bandon, County Cork, he moved with his family to Canada when he was five, eventually settling in Toronto. He married Helen Charlotte Bailey in 1862, with whom he had a son and two daughters.

From 1856 to 1861, he worked at the Toronto Savings Bank. He later was president of the Home Bank of Canada.

In 1861, he was one of the purchasers of Toronto's Victoria Brewery (founded by George Hart and Charles Hannath c.1840s as Hannath & Hart Brewery), at the corner of Victoria and Gould Streets, which had an annual production of 1,000 barrels. In 1891, he incorporated it as the O'Keefe Brewery Company of Toronto Limited. The brewery would expand to a capacity of 500,000 barrels. He sold the business after his son died in 1911. The company would later become part of Carling O'Keefe Breweries.

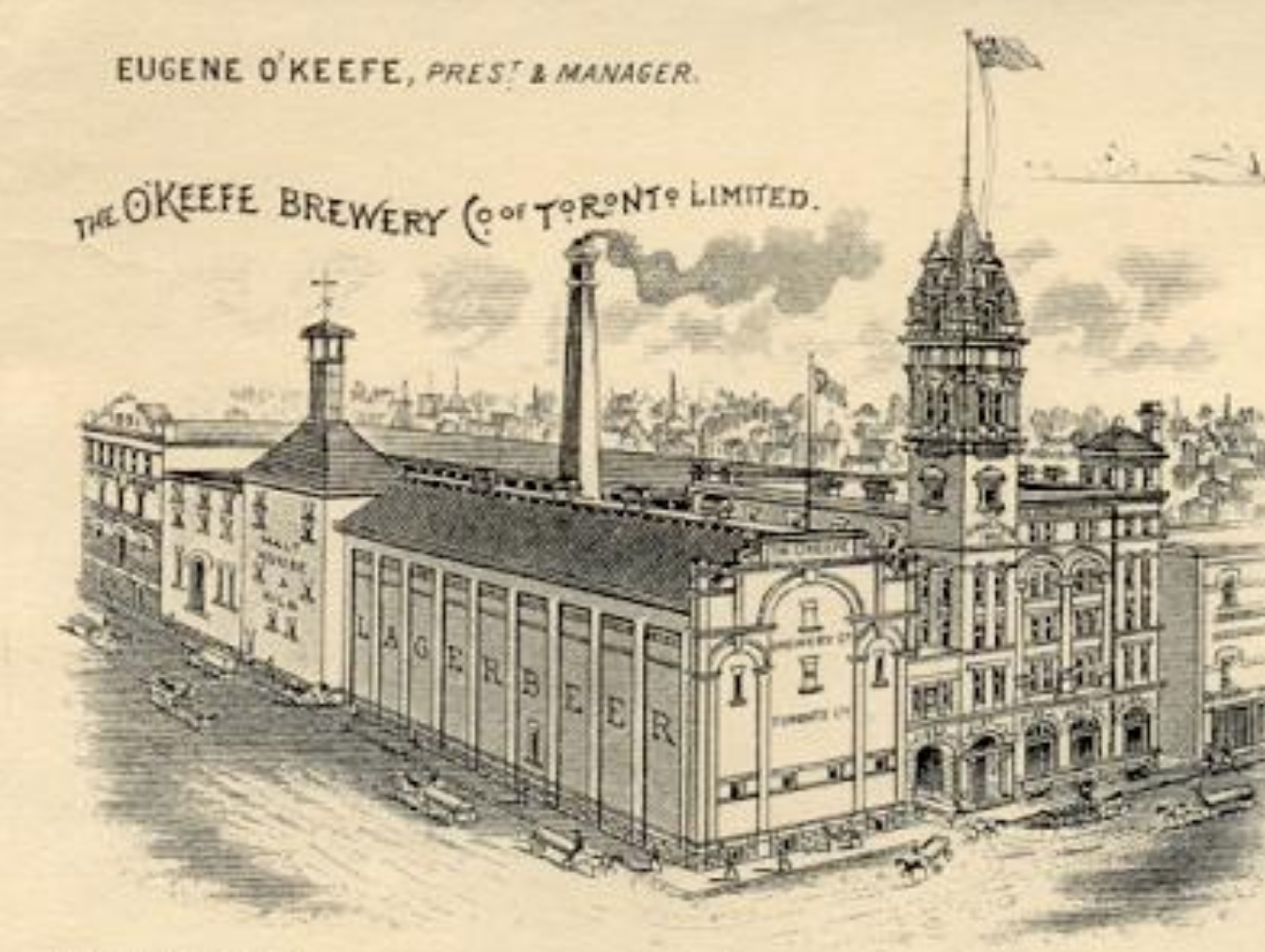
O'Keefe Brewery Company of Toronto Limited.

In 1882, he and three Humber Bay hoteliers formed the Humber Steam Ferry Company. The company operated the Annie Craig, which carried excursionists from Toronto to the resort hotels at the mouth of the Humber River.

O'Keefe was a close friend of Canadian railway magnate Hugh Ryan and served as one of his pallbearers —alongside lieutenant governor of Ontario, Sir Oliver Mowat; Conservative Senator, James Mason; Ontario politician, William Harty; Ontario Banker, W.S. Lee —at Ryan's funeral held in St Michael's Cathedral Basilica in 1899.

In 1909, Pope Pius X made him the first Canadian layman to become a private Papal chamberlain. He died at his home on Bond Street in 1913, aged 85.

== Legacy ==
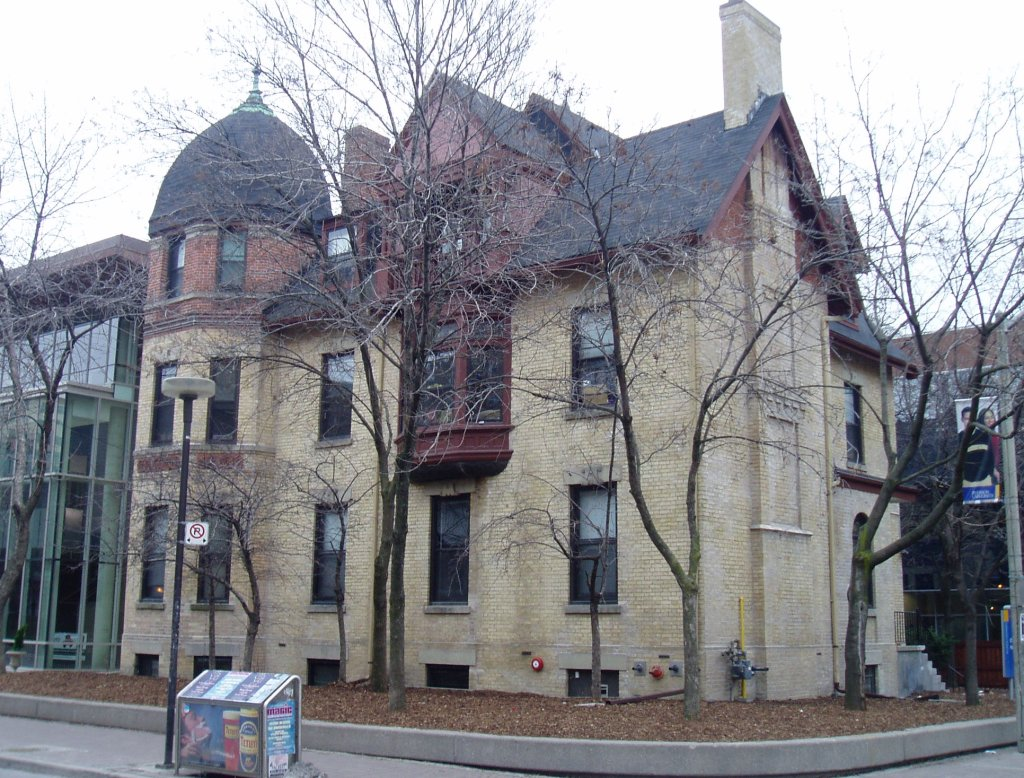
O'Keefe House in 2005

The O'Keefe name is well established in Toronto due to the many charitable donations that O'Keefe made throughout his life. He donated millions of dollars to the Catholic Church in Toronto, built five churches in Toronto, built St. Augustine's Seminary in Scarborough, and built Toronto's first low-income housing development.

The O'Keefe name was used as a tribute on the new O'Keefe Centre when it was built in 1960 by E. P. Taylor, then the head of O'Keefe Brewing Company. In 1996, the name was changed to the Hummingbird Centre. In 2007, the name was changed to the Sony Centre for the Performing Arts.

His former Toronto mansion (O'Keefe House), located across from the former O'Keefe Brewery, served as a residence for students at Ryerson University from 1964 to 2018. The former brewery itself is now the Image Arts faculty building.

Since then, a handful of individuals have been actively trying to reestablish the O'Keefe name due to the vital role that he played in shaping the city during the Victorian period. It was not until 2006 that an official biography was written about O'Keefe. The delay was due in large part to a lack of personal and company records.

== Bibliography ==
- Power, Michael (1998). "O'Keefe, Eugene". In Cook, Ramsay; Hamelin, Jean (eds.). Dictionary of Canadian Biography. Vol. XIV (1911–1920) (online ed.). University of Toronto Press.
