= Rita Cox =

Librarian and storyteller (born 1929 or 1930)

Doctor Rita Cox
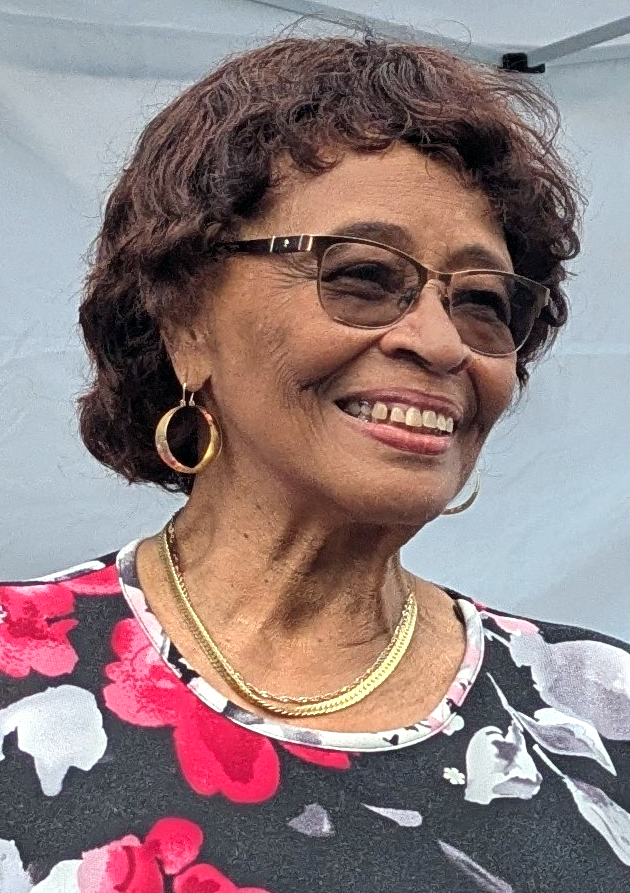
- Cox in 2024
- Born: February 18, 1930 (age 96); Trinidad and Tobago
- Education: Columbia University
- Occupation: Librarian
- Known for: Storytelling • Head of Parkdale branch at Toronto Public Library

Rita Marjorie Cox (born 1930) is a storyteller, community leader and retired librarian based in Toronto, Ontario. As the head of the Parkdale branch of the Toronto Public Library, she pioneered services that promoted multiculturalism and literacy. She was awarded the Order of Canada for storytelling, and her legacy extends to her role as a leader in Caribbean and Black communities. A library collection, park, and school (Dr. Rita Cox - Kina Minagok Public School) are named after Cox in Toronto.

== Early life ==
Rita Marjorie Cox was born in Trinidad and Tobago on February 18, 1930. Her mother was a teacher who told Cox many stories. As a child, Cox was immersed in oral storytelling in Trinidad.

Looking back on her childhood, Cox described herself as "a library child." Cox often spent time reading at her local library in Port of Spain and aspired to work in libraries from a young age. A friend of her father's was the head of the local library. She started as a library page at around 11 years old, working there into her teenage years.

To pursue her education and career, Cox moved to the United States before settling in Canada. In between, she returned to Trinidad. She arrived in Canada on 3 November 1960.

== Librarianship ==
=== New York Public Library ===
While Cox was still living in Trinidad, librarian and storyteller Augusta Baker visited from the New York Public Library to help set up a new children's library. Impressed by Cox's storytelling, Baker encouraged her to study in New York City. During her stay, Baker visited Cox's home and met her parents. Cox heeded the advice and scrapped plans to study in the United Kingdom.

While studying at Columbia University, Cox worked at New York Public Library's flagship building on 42nd Street and Fifth Avenue, where she was mentored by Augusta Baker. Cox performed stories to children based on her Trinidadian heritage and met many famous people and writers who came in to do research.

=== Toronto Public Library ===
An interest in children's literature led Cox to join the Boys and Girls House at the Toronto Public Library in 1960, which a friend had mentioned to her. That branch was dedicated to serving children and was the first of its kind in the Commonwealth. It was also home to the Osborne Collection of Early Children's Books, which was of interest to Cox. At first, Cox worked as a children's librarian and moved between different locations in the library system.

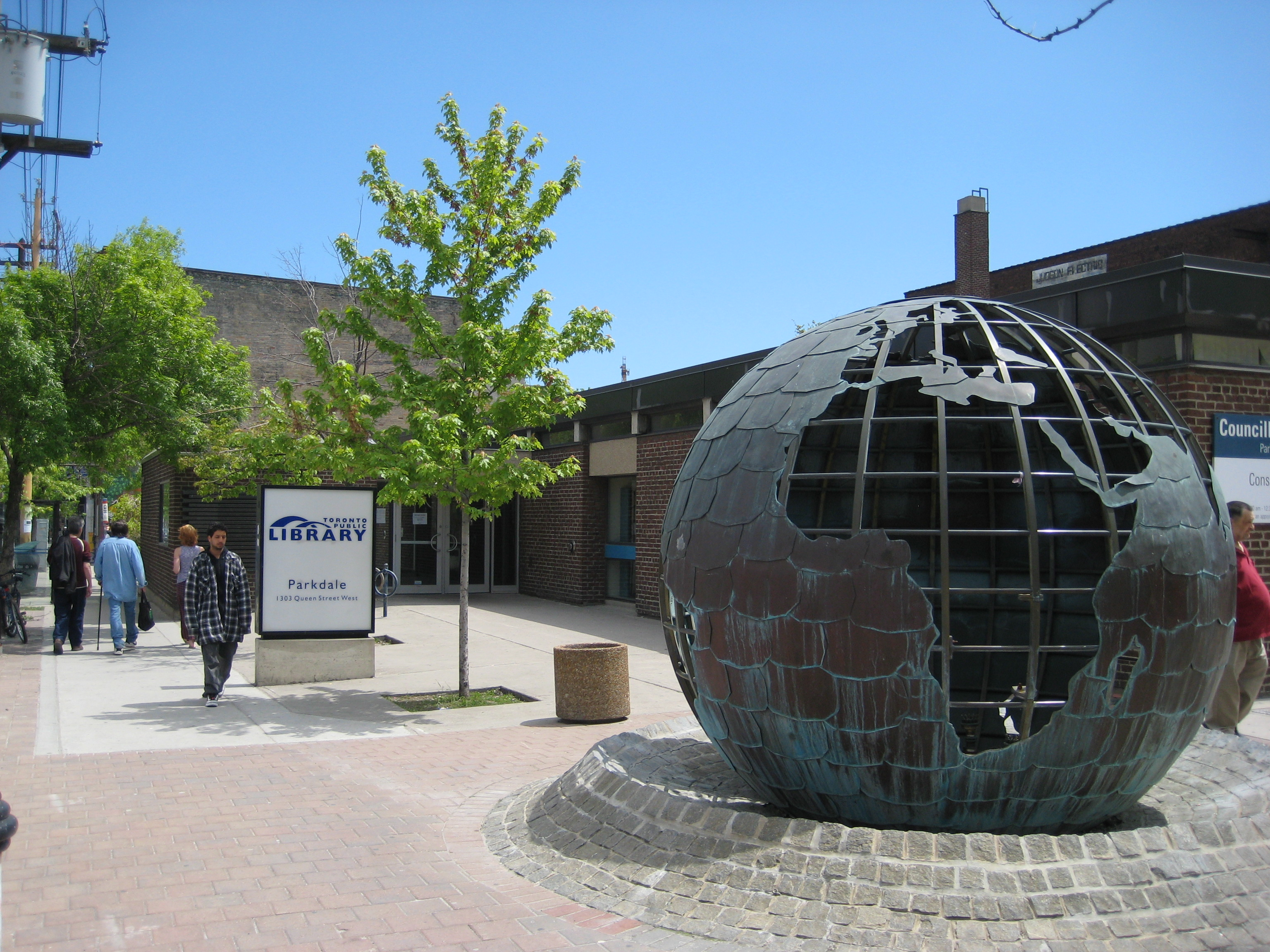
Parkdale branch of Toronto Public Library, 2010

In 1972, Cox accepted a job as a children's librarian at a branch in Parkdale and soon after became the head of the branch. She remained the head of the branch until her retirement in 1995. Here she started literacy programs and projects that promoted multiculturalism—including a collection devoted to Caribbean heritage. Other notable initiatives included: annual Black History Month celebrations; month-long celebrations for ethnic groups, dubbed Festival International; the Parkdale Intercultural Association; Parkdale Community Information Referral; a pre-school children's literacy program, Read Together; and an adult literacy program, Project Read, which developed its own board in 1980. Some of the pre-school and older adult programs pioneered by Cox were precursors for future Toronto Public Library services.

Her services at the Parkdale branch were based on close relationships with the community and aimed to improve the lives of racialized groups and newcomers. She made storytelling as an important part of her tenure at the Parkdale branch. Cox has noted that the Toronto Public Library was a supportive environment for her career.

In 1983, she was a member of the Centennial Committee for Toronto Public Library's 100th anniversary. In 1992, Cox was a consultant for the public library system in São Paulo, Brazil. She stayed in Brazil for three weeks, during which time she organized a storytelling festival and spoke to groups of library workers. Cox recalls that she "was able to advise, learn so much and to appreciate even more what we had at home."

=== Approach to librarianship ===
Cox believes that libraries are about communities and people, not just books. She has highlighted that part of her job at the Toronto Public Library was serving the needs of the community. Knowing the community and having them take ownership of services is important to Cox. A former chief librarian at Toronto Public Library, Les Fowlie, praised Cox: "Not only one of Canada's most distinguished librarians, she understands that a librarian must reach out into the community to understand and serve its needs. She integrated the library and the community into her life."

Storytelling is another essential aspect of libraries for Cox, who has stated that "a librarian's work is to share stories. It's an important way of linking the word and the book and the people." Similarly, Cox has said that being a children's librarian and being a storyteller are "synonymous".

== Storytelling ==
Rita Cox became a member of the Order of Canada for storytelling and literacy in 1997. She thinks of herself first and foremost, a storyteller: "storytelling has been the constant [...] ingredient in my entire life."

In addition to telling stories at libraries, Cox performed stories in professional tours as well as other settings across North America, the Caribbean, Brazil, and Europe. Cox draws on her Trinidadian heritage with Anansi tales and Caribbean folklore. She has performed on stage, radio, television, and Zoom. She also has taught workshops and university classes on storytelling.

Cox was a founding member of the National Association of Black Storytellers and was a board member and co-chairperson for the Storytellers School of Toronto.

=== Cumbayah festival ===
The Cumbayah Festival of Black Heritage and Storytelling was also founded in part by Cox. She developed the idea with storyteller Mary Carter Smith while attending one of many Black storytelling festivals in the United States. The first of these Toronto festivals was held in 1984 and there were at least two others, in 1987 and 1990. They spanned storytelling, music, dance, poetry, and drama. The first event coincided with Ontario's bicentennial and was held in three locations that were all stops on the Underground Railroad: Toronto, Windsor, and St. Catherines. For this 1984 event, Cox's mentor from New York Public Library, Augusta Baker, was invited to deliver a keynote address. Some of the events were held in the Parkdale branch of Toronto Public Library, while others were held across 44 schools in Toronto.

=== Album ===
In 2021, Cox released her first storytelling album Wit and Wisdom: Anansi Tales and Other Stories through the non-profit organization Storytellers of Canada.

=== Approach to storytelling ===
Cox stresses the storyteller's close connection to the story. In her words, "you can only tell a story that belongs to you. [...] Even if it comes from a different source you have to make a story your own in order to share it." She thinks of stories as "gently echoed music" between storyteller and listener, with the listener forming a version of the story in their own mind. Her delivery involves a rhythmic cadence and long pauses.

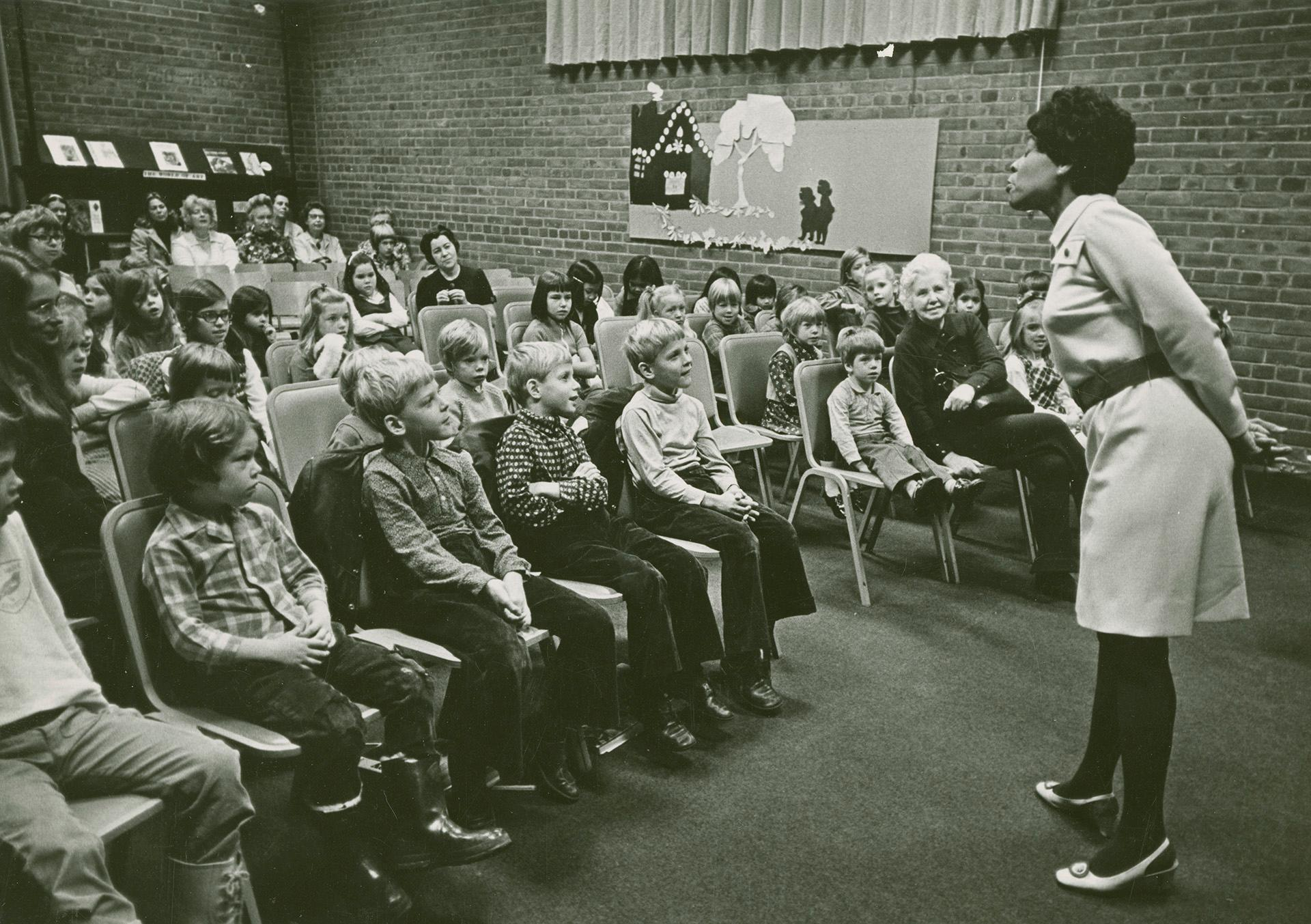
Rita Cox stands in front of an audience in the Boys and Girls House of Toronto Public Library during a storytelling festival in 1972

For Cox, storytelling is more than entertainment: "I use my storytelling to build bridges, as a link, a teaching tool, an icebreaker—with children and adults alike." Being told stories is an "essential tool" for building literacy, according to Cox.

Stories are also "vital" for revealing how similar humans are to one another, in Cox's view. She was known to modify stories based on the cultural background of her audience. She combines stories from a Trinidadian tradition with stories from around the world and points out the similarities of stories across cultures. At the same time, she emphasizes the importance of storytelling in a postcolonial context. For instance, she has noted that Anansi stories "are often an expression of something deeper... how the black man survived in the new world." She also feels a responsibility to share stories to sustain various cultures.

== Other work ==
Cox was a founding member of the Caribbean Centennial Committee, which organized Toronto's Caribana festival in 1967. She volunteered in the first festival. Later on, she stated that the festival "changed Toronto [...] it really showed everyone the meaning of multiculturism." Cox was appointed to the Festival Management Committee after the 2006 festival and then again in 2016.

Cox has also authored several stories and one children's book. Her children's book, How Trouble Made the Monkey Eat Pepper (1977), is a West Indian folktale illustrated by Roy Cross. A review of the book in The Globe and Mail was negative but praised the ending. Another review in Enviro New Express was mixed, with criticism of the black and white illustrations.

She wrote a booklet about library services for children, Multicultural Programming (1989), as part of a series from the Canadian Library Association.

Before and after her retirement, Cox joined a variety of boards and committees for local organizations (she was an original board member of the Parkdale Legal Aid Centre) and provincial organizations (she was on Ontario's Advisory Council on Multiculturalism from 1979 to 1986 and the Ontario Arts Council's Board of Directors from 2004 to 2010).

Between 1991 and 2001, Cox created and taught a course called "Children's Literature, an Intercultural Perspective" at York University.

In 2000, she was appointed a citizenship judge.

== Legacy ==
Cox lives in the Swansea neighbourhood of Toronto. A library collection, park, and school are named in her honour in Toronto. The "Unveiling Heroes of the Block" project by the Black Speculative Arts Movement (BSAM) Canada featured a stylized portrait of Cox created in 2021.

=== Library collection ===
Cox and her library colleagues started a collection of West Indian books at the Parkdale branch of Toronto Public Library in 1973. In 2006, it was renamed the "Rita Cox Black and Caribbean Heritage Collection". Cox acquired books from international sources, which was not a standard process for the library, including buying books when she travelled.

The collection now has about 20,000 items for kids, teens, and adults, across several formats. Items in the collection are available to borrow from four branches: Parkdale, Malvern, Maria A. Shchuka, and York Woods. According to Toronto Public Library, it is "one of the most significant Black and Caribbean heritage collections in Canada."

The collection served as a jumping-off point for cultural programming such as book launches for Caribbean Canadian writers, making Parkdale a hub for Caribbean culture in Toronto.

A stylized collage portrait of Cox was created to celebrate the collection's 50th anniversary in 2023.

=== Names of park and school ===
In 2008, a park named in honour of Cox opened, located at 14 Machells Avenue in Toronto.

In 2022, a school in the Parkdale neighbourhood in Toronto was renamed "Dr. Rita Cox - Kina Minogok Public School", honouring Cox and an Indigenous phrase. Established in 1887, the school was previously named "Queen Victoria Public School". The name change was sparked by a movement for decolonization. Over 150 names were submitted by the community for consideration.

== Awards and honours ==
- Canada Birthday Award (1982)
- Ontario Bicentennial Award (1984)
- Canadian Library Association Public Service Award (1986)
- Black Achievement Award (1986)
- Award of Merit from the City of Toronto (1987)
- Kay Livingstone Award of the Congress of Black Women
- Ontario Folk Arts Recognition Fellowship for storytelling (1991)
- Ontario Library Association Children's Services Guild Award (1992)
- Governor General's Commemorative Medal (1992)
- Honorary doctorate degree from York University (1993)
- Honorary doctorate degree from Wilfrid Laurier University (1994)
- Gardiner Award (1994)
- Award from librarians in Trinidad and Tobago for professional guidance (1994)
- Black Achievement Award (1995)
- Multi-page tribute in The Caribbean Camera (1995)
- Member of the Order of Canada for outstanding work in storytelling and literacy (1997)
- African Canadian Lifetime Award, Outstanding Contribution to the Community from Pride Magazine (2010)
- Honouree of 100 Accomplished Black Canadian Women (2016)
- Caribbean Tourism Organization Lifetime Achievement Award (2019)
