= The Palace Pier =

Site of two towers in Toronto, Ontario, Canada

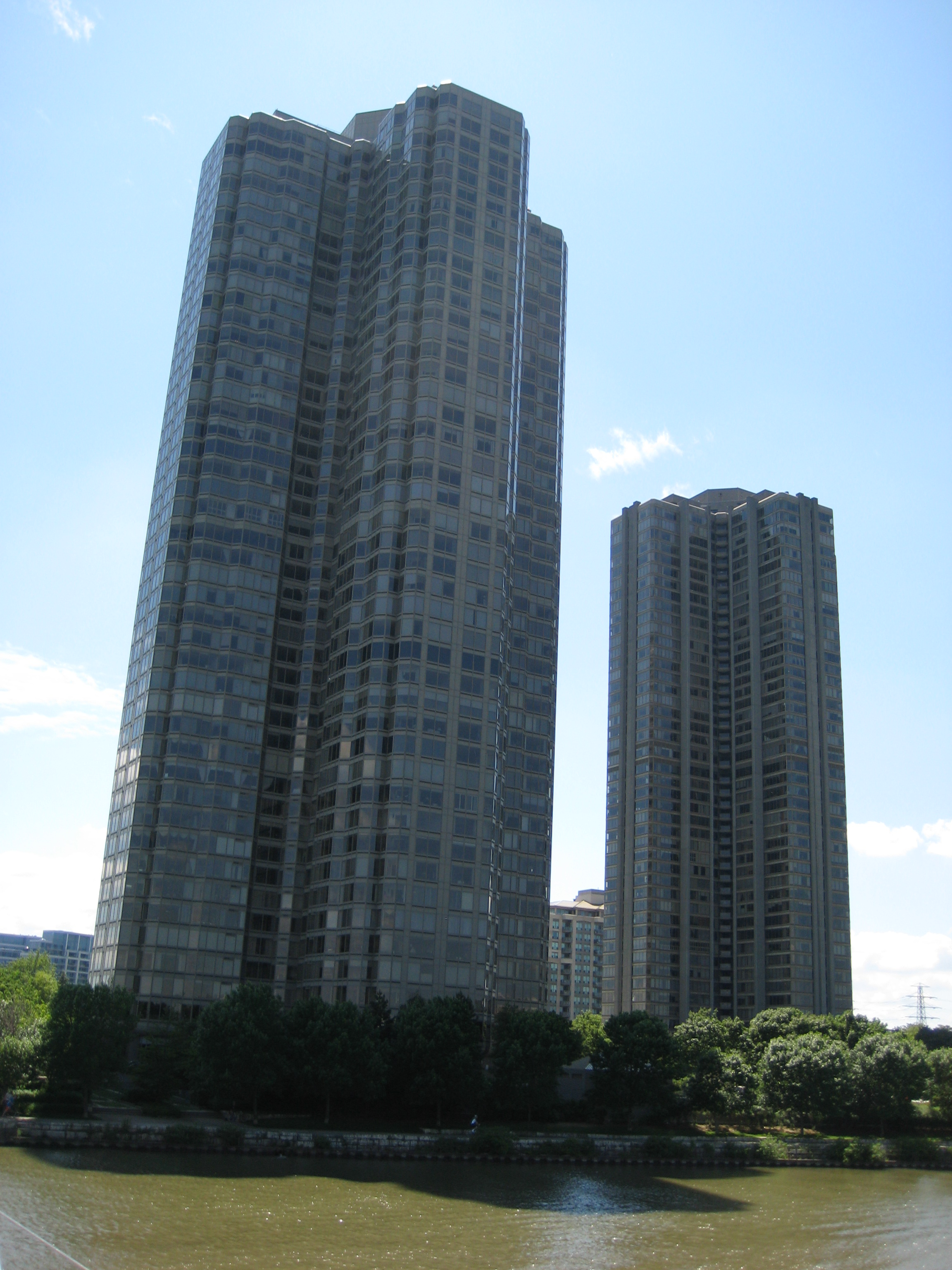
- Interactive map of the The Palace Pier area

General information
- Status: Completed
- Architectural style: Late Modernist
- Coordinates: 43.631192°N 79.473252°W
- Completed: 1978, 1991

Technical details
- Floor count: 46

The Palace Pier is the site of Palace Place and Palace Pier, two cruciform condominium towers tied for the 45th-tallest building in Toronto, Ontario, Canada. They are located at 2045 Lake Shore Boulevard West and 1 Palace Pier Court in the Humber Bay neighbourhood in the former city of Etobicoke.

== Overview ==
The complex consists of two luxury condominium towers, Palace Pier (North Tower) and Palace Place (South Tower). Both towers are completely separate condominium corporations. Together, they form an architectural gateway for the west end of Toronto's waterfront and are considered the eastern border of the Humber Bay Shores neighbourhood of Etobicoke.

The original Palace Pier Tower (North Tower) was completed in 1978. Designed by Edward I. Richmond, the 46 floor residential structure was the tallest residential structure in Canada at the time. The Palace Place Tower (South Tower) was completed in 1991. Both towers offer views of the Toronto skyline, Lake Ontario, as well as the western suburbs. On a clear day, residents have unobstructed views across the lake and may see the mist rising from Niagara Falls as well as the Niagara Escarpment.

== History of Palace Pier site ==
Prior to 1927, the site was home to the Wimbleton House Hotel (c. 1860s), then as Crow's Hotel (c. 1900), and as a beach remained for many years after known as Crow's or Crowes Beach. A lifeguard station was located at the mouth of the Humber (built in 1920 and similar to Leuty in the Beach area) and disappeared with the construction of Palace Pier complex.

The name for the Palace Pier complex comes from an amusement pier, which was located on the site of the current towers.

Costing $1.25 million in 1927 dollars, the pier development was proclaimed as one of the biggest landmarks to ever be built on the Toronto waterfront and would be similar to the many amusement piers found along the coast in England. However, it was to be much more costly to construct and certainly more impressive than its namesake in Brighton, England – according to the promoters at the time. The structure was designed by architects Craig and Madill.

The development was to be financed with public funds raised by an England-based company, Provincial Improvement Corporation. The financial prospectus, used to finance the project by the public sale of $10 shares, described the new four-structure facility as a “Palace of Fun” - sitting atop an illuminated pier stretching nearly a third of a mile out into Lake Ontario.

The proposed pier would include a 30,000 sq ft (2,800 m^{2}) ballroom that would accommodate 3,000 couples, a roller rink (converted for ice skating in the winter months), 1,400-seat theatre, an outdoor Band Pavilion seating 1,500, and several restaurants and souvenir stores. The pier would also allow for steamer ships to dock alongside the structure, easing congestion for the 50,000 people a day the prospectus claimed would attend the amusement facility.

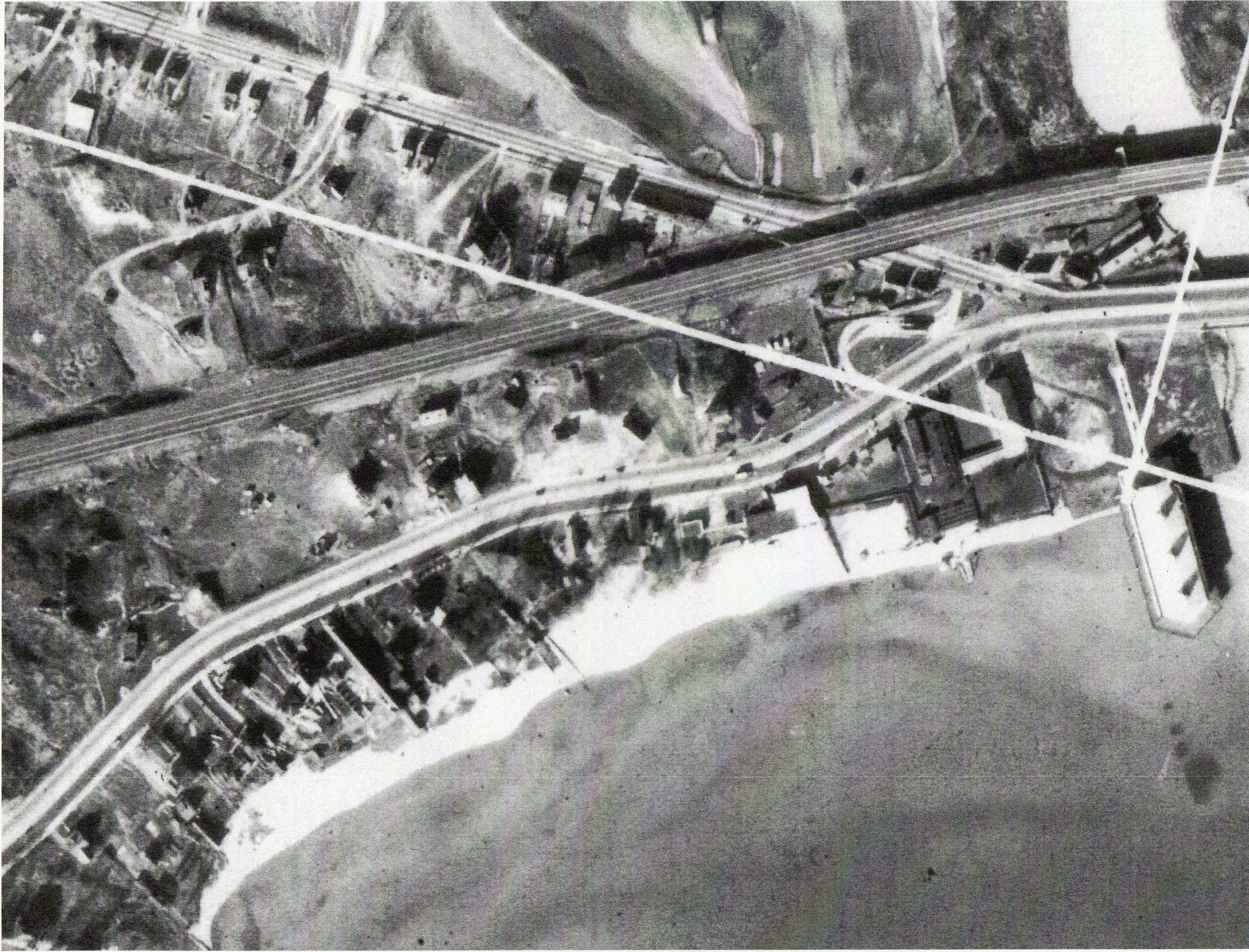
A 1936 aerial photograph shows the only portion of the pier constructed.

The financing of the project went slowly, with the cornerstone of the first building being dedicated by former Canadian prime minister Arthur Meighen in 1931. However, as with many projects of the time, financial difficulties would affect the project and in the end, only a few hundred feet of pier was built.

Only the first phase of the redesigned amusement pier, 90 metres long, was opened on June 10, 1941 and it became popular as a major dance hall of the big band era during World War II and the postwar years. Hollywood celebrity Bob Hope, who was in town promoting his latest film, officially opened the new Palace Pier by doing a few laps around the roller rink in front of fans. As big band music faded away, boxing and wrestling matches, religious revival meetings, country and western concerts, and high school proms became the major events to frequent the Palace Pier.

The pier was designed by Craig & Madill with various structures in a flamboyant Moroccan style of architecture. The firm was better known for the many cathedrals and public buildings they built, frequently in the Georgian Revival style.

The pier was destroyed by fire in 1963, and the site later redeveloped into condominiums and a public park. A 1994 Etobicoke Historical Board plaque on the Waterfront Trail just west of the mouth of the Humber River is attached to what is left of the original Palace Pier dance hall.

== The neighbourhood ==
The local waterfront features the Martin Goodman Trail, which allows for walking, jogging, cycling, and inline skating along a 22-kilometre path that leads through scenic parkland as well as the 300-kilometre Lake Ontario Greenway Waterfront Trail. Marinas, the yacht club, and boating opportunities are located nearby, as well as dining, entertainment, and cultural amenities, which are situated within walking distance. It is also near the Gardiner Expressway (which connects to the Queen Elizabeth Way and Highway 427), and the TTC's Humber Loop. The buildings are also only a 10-minute walk from Sobey's, Shoppers Drug Mart, and the LCBO.

Working together, the City of Toronto Parks and Recreation Department and the Toronto and Region Conservation Authority have enhanced the natural environment in the area with the introduction of a new waterfront park — the Humber Bay Butterfly Habitat — enhanced wetlands and fish habitats, and trails.
