= Jean-Bonaventure Rousseau =

- Born: 1726
- Died: 1774 (aged 47–48)
- Occupation: fur trader
- Known for: influential fur trader and interpreter
- Children: Jean Baptiste Rousseau

Jean-Bonaventure Rousseau (1726–1774) was an influential fur trader in New France, and, after its capture by Great Britain, the Province of Canada. His father who also went by the given name Jean, had been a fur trader in the Ohio River valley. His son Jean Baptiste Rousseau started as a fur trader before becoming one of the most important merchants in Upper Canada.

In the 1750s, French authorities destroyed some fortifications, including the Magasin Royal, Fort Toronto and Fort Rouillé during the Seven Years' War. Rousseau restored Fort Toronto, near the mouth of the Humber, to serve as a fur trading post, and delegated its operation to his son.

After the British conquest of New France, Rousseau swore a loyalty oath and worked for the British as an interpreter, circa 1770. He subsequently received a license to trade fur around the Toronto area “and from thence to any markets or parts which he should find advantageous for the sale of his merchandise". This included the trade along both the Humber River and Credit River.

A record exists of the contents of the freight canoe that carried his first trade goods, which included 80 imperial gallons (360 L) of rum, as well as 16 imperial gallons (73 L) of wine. Thomas Gage, commander of British forces in North America, wrote that Rousseau was "debauching" First Nations people.
