= Annie Craig =

Steamship

Annie Craig was a wooden screw steamer registered in Port Dover in 1880. With a net tonnage of 40 tons, she was able to carry about 300 passengers. She was lost on 3 August, 1885 due to fire while docked in Toronto. The boilers of the Annie Craig were salvaged.

The vessel was built as tug in 1879 by David Foster in Port Burwell, Ontario and rebuilt in Port Dover by Foster in 1880.

== Career in Lake Erie ==
For three seasons she operated on Lake Erie from Port Dover. On 30 Sept 1880 she carried the Governor General and suite to the Long Point Company's shooting grounds. American middleweight boxers were planning an illegal match at Long Point, ON. The Annie Craig transported Norfolk Sheriff Deedes and other forces to Long Point. They were successful in persuading the Americans to return to Erie and Buffalo.

== Humber Steam Ferry ==
The Annie Craig was purchased in 1882 by the Humber Steam Ferry Co. Three hotel owners (John Duck, Octavius Hicks and Charles Nurse) plus a brewer Eugene O'Keefe were the owners of the ferry company. The hotels were located in Etobicoke Township at the mouth of the Humber River. Access from Toronto was difficult as the streetcar lines did not extend that far west. Initially passengers were carried from a wharf near Yonge Street to John Duck's dock with an intermediate stop at the foot of Bathurst St. The 1885 route had intermediate stops at the Exhibition Grounds and High Park.

"Captain Fred. Twitchell was charged with desecrating the Sabbath by running his boat, the Annie Craig." Twitchell was discharged when the complainant failed to appear. On 11 October Twitchell made his final appearance on a charge of Sabbath violation and was fined $1. The Twitchell case did not deter operations of the ferry company.

The loss of the Annie Craig in 1885 eventually led to the shutdown of the ferry company in July 1886.

In 1886, Doty Bros operated the "palace steamers" Queen City and Canadian to High Park and Humber. "The steamer Canadian, which ran on the Humber route last season, has been sold to Mr Robert Davies, who will fit her out to run to Victoria Park and vicinity." Davies also chartered the Gertrude and operated for ships to Victoria Park and Humber for summer 1887. Steamer service to the Humber then ended. The only public transport available was the Grand Trunk Railway until the Toronto and Mimico Electric Railway and Light Company began service from Sunnyside to the Humber in 1892.

== Modern relevance ==
A short street in the Humber Bay Shores neighbourhood of Toronto has been named Annie Craig Drive.
