= Humber Bay =

Bay in Ontario, Canada

Coordinates: 43.626°N 79.457°W

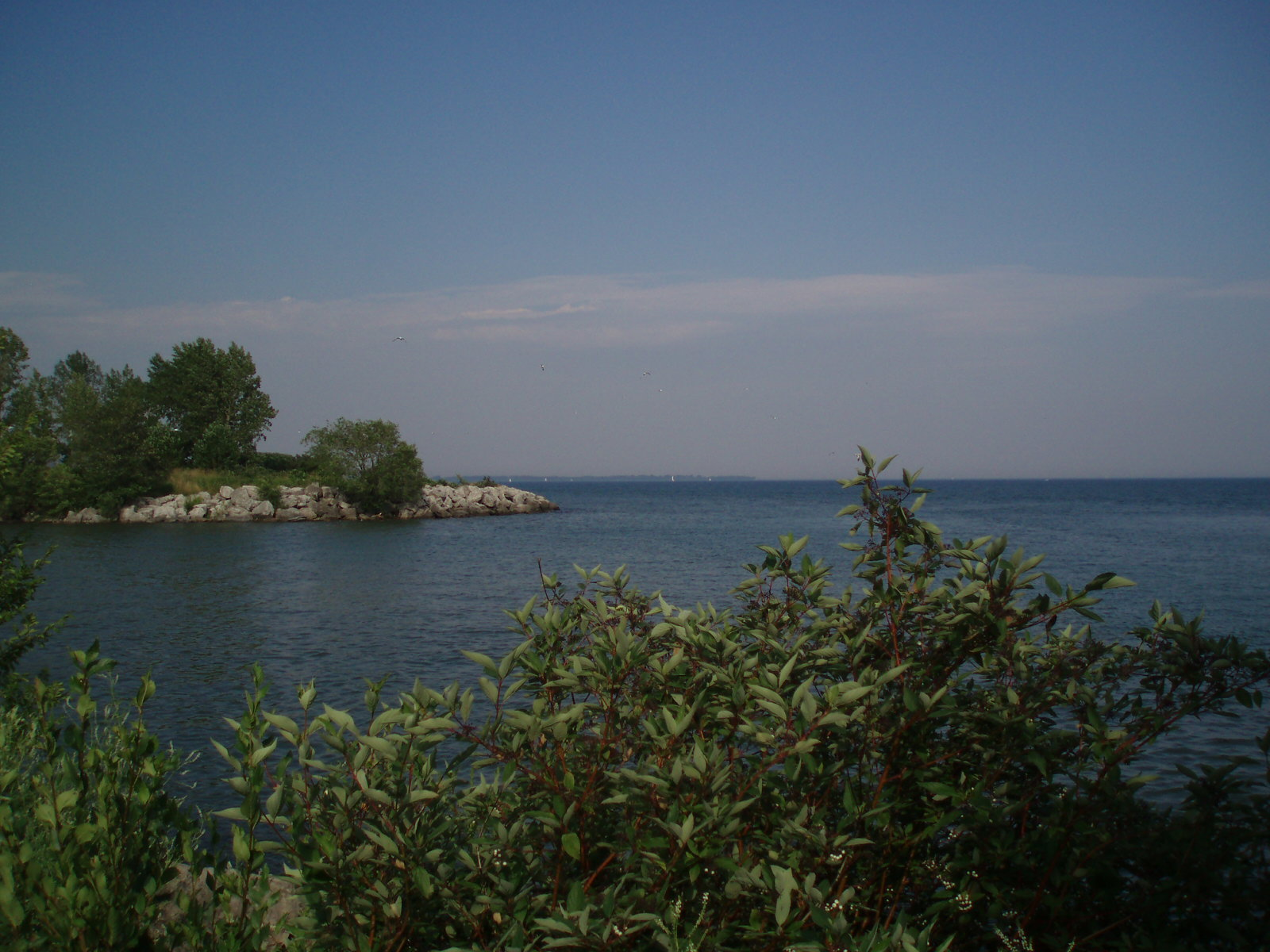
Humber Bay

Humber Bay is a bay of Lake Ontario south of Toronto, Ontario, Canada. It is located between Ontario Place on the east and Mimico Creek to the west. The bay gives its name to Etobicoke's Humber Bay neighbourhood.

== History ==
Prior to 1809, the bay was lined with a sandy beach with forest inland. The area remained natural until later in the 19th century when it became developed with boathouses and various roadhouses and hotels.

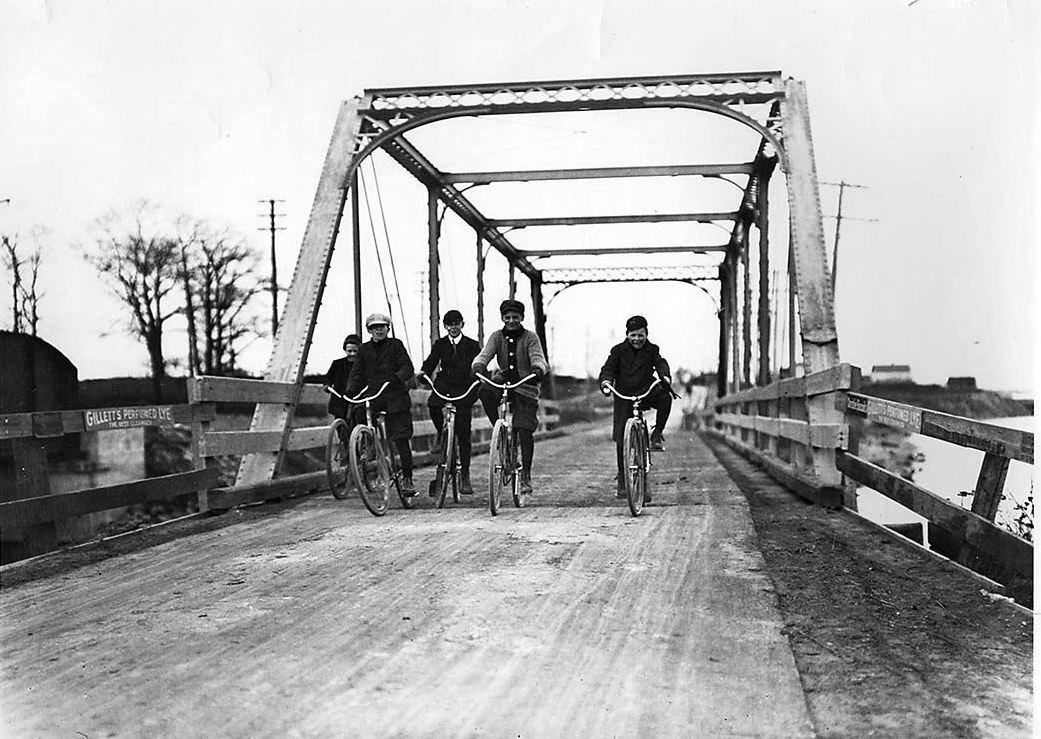
Boys cycling across Lakeshore Road bridge at Mimico (ca. 1907)

In 1802, a ferry service to cross Humber River was established by Richard Wilson. In 1882 ferry service, Humber River Ferry Company Limited was started from the Humber to Toronto by a consortium of hotel owners (Charles Nurse, John Duck and Octavius Hicks). This service ceased operations in 1886, but later ferry operations by other operators continued into the 1890s to Bathurst Street and York Street. The Toronto Harbour Commission reshaped the waterfront, infilling the shoreline by 100 yards from the Humber River east to Wilson Park Avenue. This was followed by the construction of a bridge across the river and the extension of Lakeshore Road (later rechristened as Lake Shore Boulevard) to the area and ending the need for ferry service as vehicles were able to bring travellers to and from Toronto.

In the 1970s, the Toronto and Region Conservation Authority built Humber Bay Park at the foot of Park Lawn Avenue. The only remaining natural shoreline is that east of Wilson Park Avenue, showing a small bluff to the lake side.

== Humber Bay postal village ==
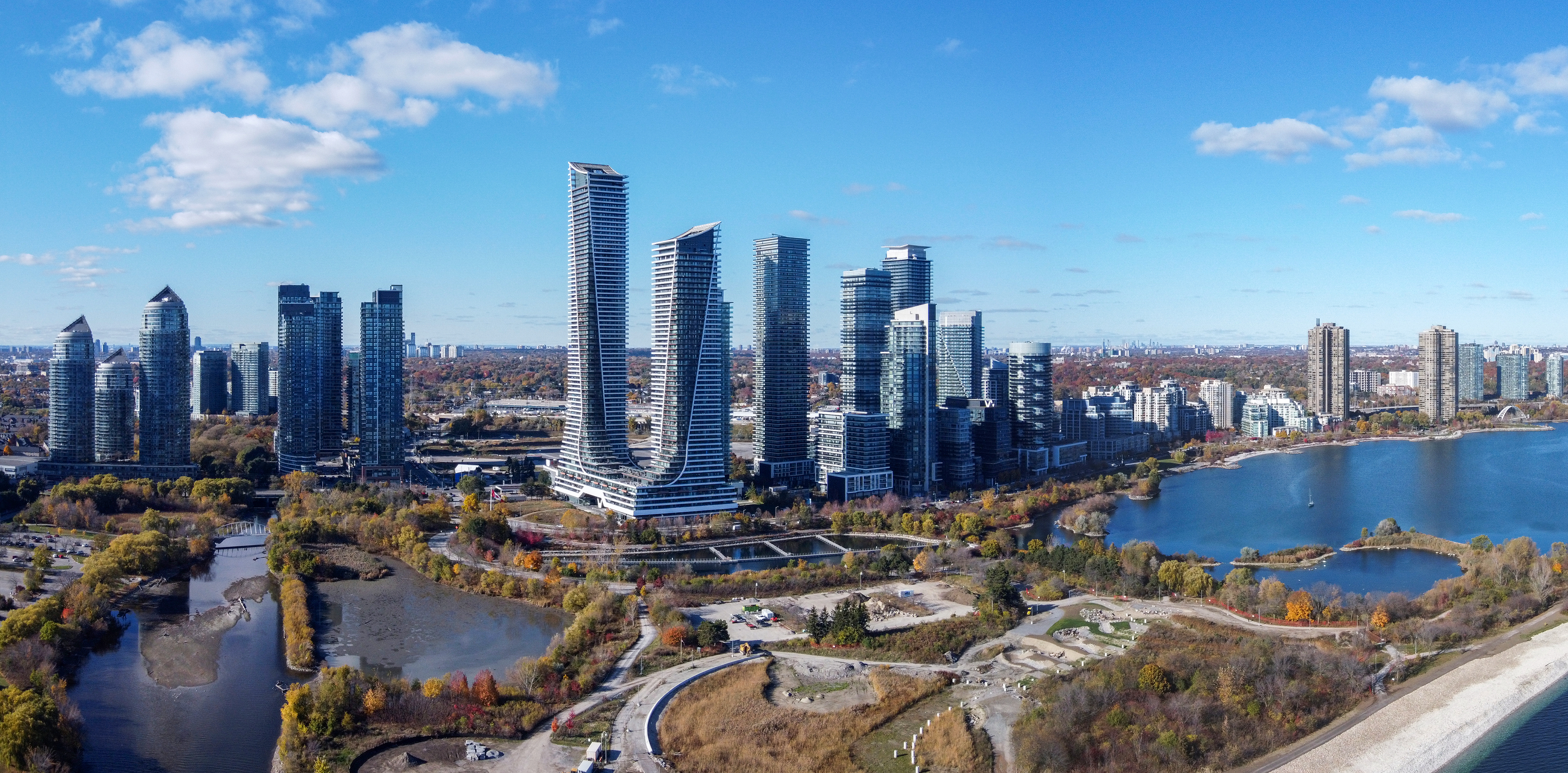
Condominium towers on Humber Bay

The western riverbank of the Humber where it meets Lake Ontario was the site of an informal settlement of homes within the then Etobicoke Township. This neighbourhood was eventually cleared for the building of the Queen Elizabeth Way highway, the railway and other projects. Along Lake Shore Boulevard West in the same vicinity, the area was settled, then cleared for motels, and now cleared for condominium towers. The area is still informally known as Humber Bay.

== Half Moon Bay ==
Half Moon Bay is the crescent shaped area between Humber Bay, the Western Channel entering Toronto Harbour (from Fort Rouillé to Strachan Avenue).

The area was a site of the landing of American troops during the Battle of York on April 27, 1813.

Today Half Moon Bay is partially covered by infill along Lake Shore Boulevard and by Ontario Place.

== See also ==
- Annie Craig
- Humber Bay Arch Bridge
- Humber Bay Park
- Humber River (Ontario)
- Sunnyside, Toronto
- Humber Bay
