= Humber Bay Park =

Municipal park in Toronto, Canada

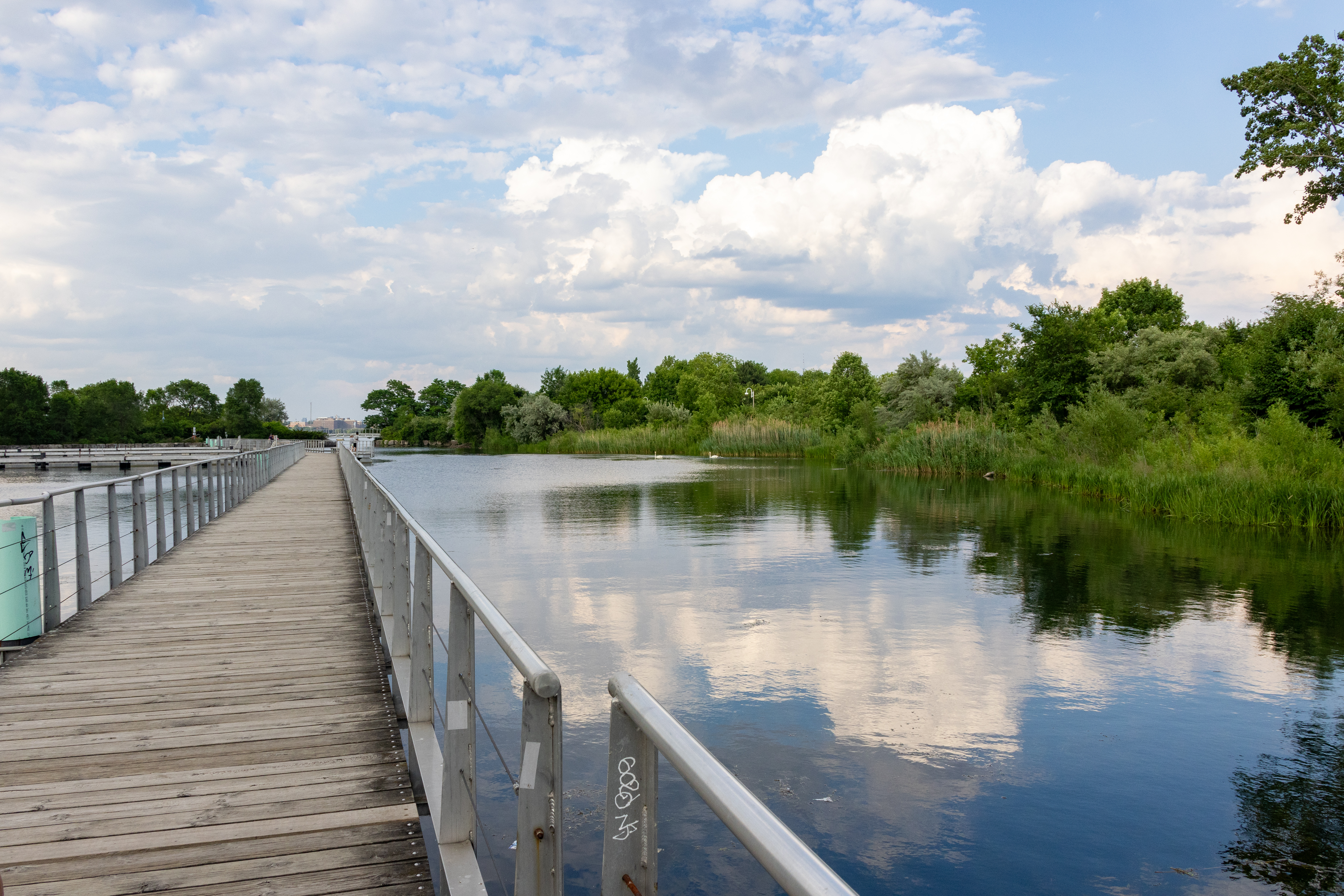
- Humber Bay Park

- Location within Toronto
- Type: Urban park
- Location: Toronto, Ontario
- Coordinates: 43°37′14″N 79°28′41″W
- Area: 343.1 acres (138.8 ha)
- Created: 1984
- Operator: City of Toronto

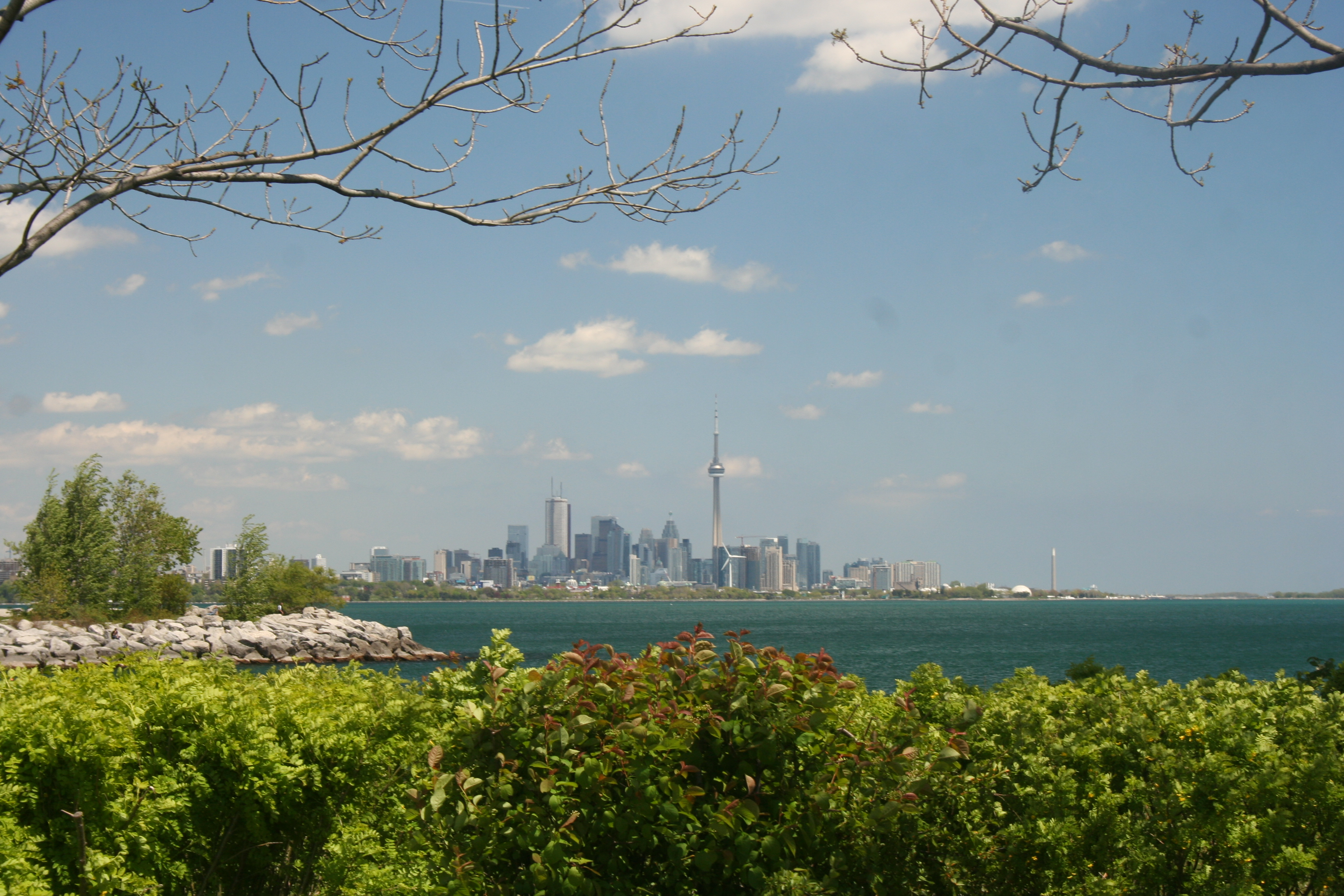
Toronto Skyline from Humber Bay Park

Humber Bay Park is a waterfront park located in Etobicoke, part of Toronto, Ontario, Canada. The park consists of two landspits situated at the mouth of Mimico Creek. The park is south of Lake Shore Boulevard West, near Park Lawn Road. Humber Bay Park East is 19 hectares (47 acres), while Humber Bay Park West is 120 hectares (300 acres).

== History ==
The park maintains a recreational focus for residents and visitors, and was established during the mid-19th century when a number of motels were built in the Humber Bay area. Crow’s Beach was a resort that operated from the 1870s to 1912. were enjoyed here during the summer and town council meetings were often held in the Humber Bay motels. Boat building was the earliest trade practiced in what would become the community of Humber Bay.

Humber Bay Park was developed by the former Metropolitan Toronto and Region Conservation Authority with 5.1 million cubic metres of lakefill, at a cost of $6.56 million. Lieutenant-Governor John Black Aird opened the park on June 11, 1984. Several habitat restoration projects have been initiated at Humber Bay Park, including the planting of Carolinian trees and shrubs, the establishment of wildflower meadows and the creation of a warm-water fish habitat and wetland on the east peninsula. The park is also a popular destination to view migrating birds.

== Mimico Cruising Club Lighthouses ==
The Eastern Gap Lighthouses were built in 1895 and located along waterway. The larger of two lighthouses is a four-storey structure and the smaller two storey building. Removed in 1973 during the widening of the Eastern Gap, both the large and small lighthouses were relocated to Marine Terminal 51 and offered to the Etobicoke Yacht Club. They were relocated to Humber Bay Park in 1981 and restored for use by the Mimico Cruising Club in 1982. Currently, one lighthouse is located on the Etobicoke Yacht Club property at the entrance to bay the other is on the Mimico Cruising Club property at the northeast end of the bay.reference https://www.eyc.ca/About_EYC/Gallery

== Amenities ==
The park has a number of amenities such as picnic tables, trails, and a beach front. There are fly casting and model boating ponds and a fully accessible fishing pier. The Humber Bay Park Boating Federation and historic old Eastern Gap Lighthouse (c. 1895) are located at Humber Bay West, along with public boat launch ramps and moorings. Humber Bay Park East was home to Toronto's memorial to the victims of the bombing of Air India Flight 182.
