= Jean Baptiste Rousseau (fur trader) =

- Born: July 4, 1758; Montreal, New France
- Died: November 16, 1812 (aged 54); Niagara on the Lake, Upper Canada
- Other names: St. John John Baptist Rousseau; Mr St. John
- Occupations: fur trader, merchant, and translator

Jean Baptiste Rousseau was a fur trader, merchant, government official, and officer in the British Indian Department in Upper Canada.

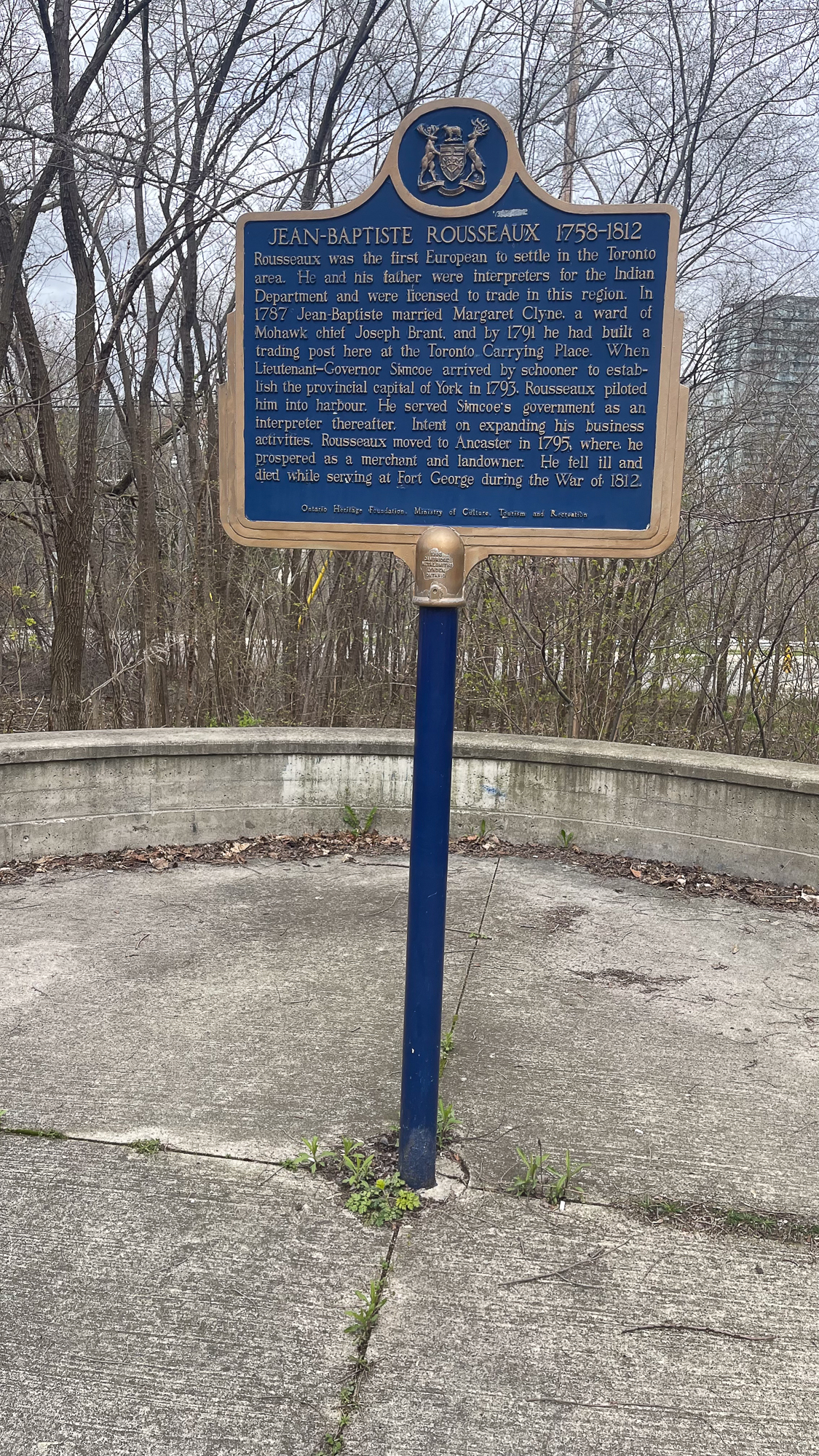

Jean Baptiste Rousseau was born in Montreal, New France. His father, Jean-Bonaventure Rousseau, was a fur trader, operating out of the area around Lake Ontario. Through his own work in the fur trade, Rousseau learned the languages of the local First Nations. In 1770 Rousseau's father was licensed to trade fur at the mouth of what is now known as the Humber River, a stopping place for First Nations people travelling from Lake Ontario to the upper lakes.

Rousseau had strong ties with Joseph Brant, the influential Mohawk leader who had fought with the British during the American Revolution. His second wife, Margaret Clyne, was Brant's adopted daughter. Rousseau and his wife named one of their sons Joseph Brant. Rousseau would later purchase 12,000 acres of Mohawk land through Brant.

John Graves Simcoe, the first Lieutenant Governor of Upper Canada, granted Rousseau 500 acres around his fur trading post on the eastern bank of the Humber River in what is now the Swansea neighbourhood.

Rousseau became one of the first merchants in York, and later Hamilton. He was owner, or part-owner, of multiple grist mills and taverns, in Kingston, York, Ancaster and Brantford.

Rousseau had been a long-time officer in the militia. He was a Lieutenant Colonel when he served during the Battle of Queenston Heights, in October 1812. He survived the battle, without being wounded, but fell ill and died in November, 1812.
