= Exhibition Place =

Publicly owned mixed-use development in Toronto

- Exhibition facility
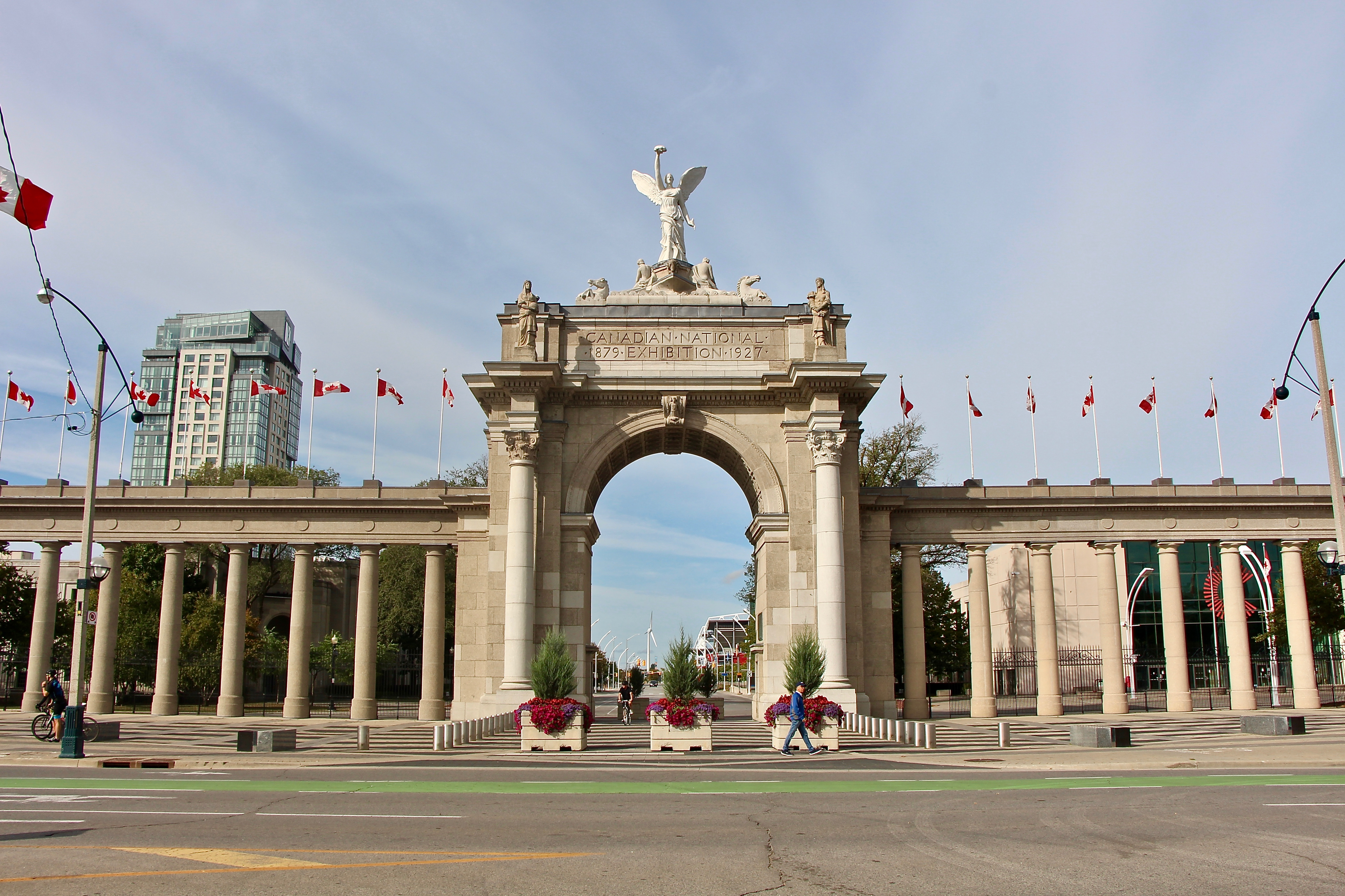
- The Princes' Gates are the eastern entrance of Exhibition Place
- Area: 80 hectares (200 acres)
- Owner: City of Toronto
- Manager: Board of Governors of Exhibition Place
- Location: Toronto, Ontario, Canada
- Location of Exhibition Place in Toronto
- Coordinates: 43°37′58″N 79°24′58″W
- Website: http://www.explace.on.ca

Exhibition Place is a publicly owned mixed-use district in Toronto, Ontario, Canada, located by the shoreline of Lake Ontario, just west of downtown. The 197-acre (80 ha) site includes exhibit, trade, and banquet centres, theatre and music buildings, monuments, parkland, sports facilities, and a number of civic, provincial, and national historic sites. The district's facilities are used year-round for exhibitions, trade shows, public and private functions, and sporting events.

From mid-August through Labour Day each year, the Canadian National Exhibition (CNE), from which the name Exhibition Place is derived, is held on the grounds. During the CNE, Exhibition Place encompasses 260 acres (1.1 km^{2}), expanding to include nearby parks and parking lots. The CNE uses the buildings for exhibits on agriculture, food, arts and crafts, government and trade displays. For entertainment, the CNE provides a midway of rides and games, music concerts at the Bandshell, featured shows at the Coliseum, and the Canadian International Air Show held over Lake Ontario just south of Exhibition Place. The fair is one of the largest and most successful of its kind in North America and an important part of the culture of Toronto. In the fall, the Coliseum hosts the Royal Agricultural Winter Fair.

The buildings on the site date from the 1700s to recent years. Five buildings on the site (the Fire Hall/Police Station, Government Building, Horticulture Building, Music Building and Press Building), were designated a National Historic Site of Canada in 1988. The grounds have seen a mix of protection for heritage buildings along with new development. The site was originally set aside for military purposes and gradually given over to exhibition purposes. One military building remains.

== The site ==
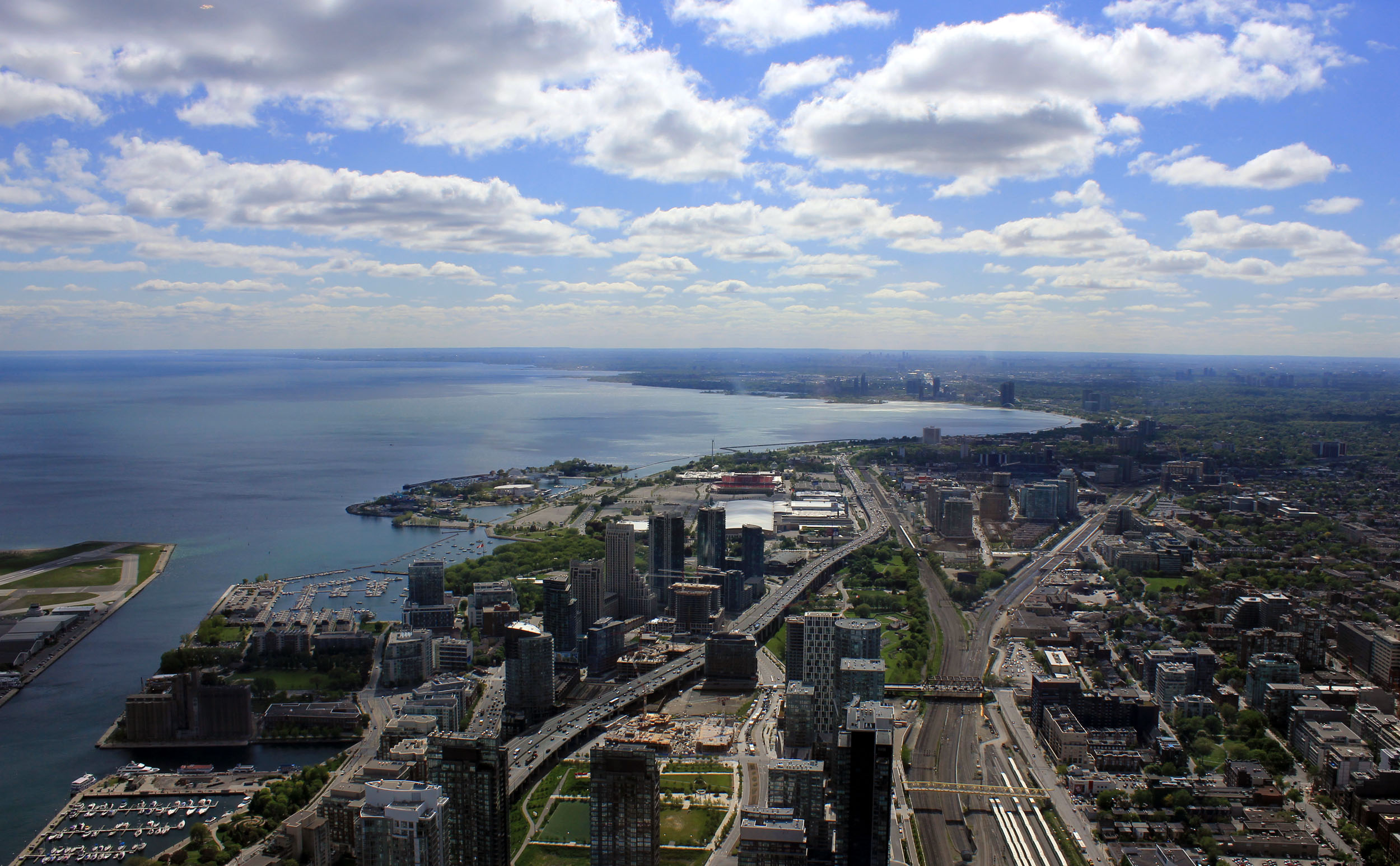
View of Exhibition Place, looking west from the CN Tower in 2013. The site is situated in center distance, left (south) of the elevated freeway, starting immediately beyond the last tower block.

Exhibition Place is a rectangular site located length-wise along the north shoreline of Lake Ontario to the west of downtown Toronto. The site is mostly flat ground sloping down gently to the shoreline. It was originally forested land, and was cleared for military use. Sections east and south of the Stanley Barracks building were filled in the early part of the 20th century. Today, the district is mostly paved, with an area of parkland remaining in its western section. There is a large open paved area in the southern central section, which is used for parking and the temporary amusements of the Canadian National Exhibition (CNE). The site has a variety of historic buildings, open spaces and monuments. The eastern entrance to Exhibition Place is marked by the large ceremonial Princes' Gates, named for Edward, Prince of Wales, and his brother, Prince George, who visited in 1927. The roads are all named after Canadian provinces and territories except for Princes' Boulevard, which is the main street east to west. Several of the roads are used for the annual Grand Prix of Toronto car race. South of the grounds is the former site of Ontario Place, a now-closed theme park built in 1971 on landfill in Lake Ontario and operated by the provincial government.

The site also has a long history of sports facilities on the site, starting with an equestrian track and grandstand. The grandstand eventually was converted for use by music concerts, major league baseball and football teams. The newest sports facility to be built is the soccer-specific stadium, BMO Field. There is also an arena, the Coliseum, home to professional ice hockey. The site was used for several sports venues of the 2015 Pan American Games.

The site is administered by the Board of Governors of Exhibition Place, appointed by the City of Toronto. As of 2014, the organization had 133 full-time employees, up to 700 during major events, contributed CA$11 million annually to the City of Toronto, and attracted 5.3 million visitors annually to the site. The grounds are 192 acres (78 ha) in area.

== History of the grounds ==
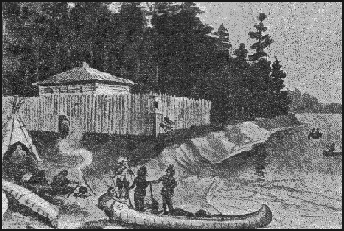
French fur traders established Fort Rouillé at Exhibition Place in 1750.

The small fort Fort Rouillé was built by French fur traders in 1750–1751 as a trading post on the site of today's grounds. The area was an important portage route for Native Americans, and the French wanted to capture their trade before they reached British posts to the south. It was burned by its garrison in 1759 after other French posts fell to the British on Lake Ontario.

When the Town of York, the predecessor of Toronto, was inaugurated in the 1790s, the land to the east and west of the garrison (later Fort York) was reserved for military purposes. This includes all of today's Exhibition Place. Years later, the British military decided to replace Fort York with New Fort York (later the Stanley Barracks), to be located to the west of the existing fort. To finance this, the military sold the eastern half of the reserve. In 1840–1841, they constructed a series of six limestone buildings and several smaller ones. The fort was surrounded by a wood fence as elaborate defensive works were never built. The fort was turned over to the Canadian military in 1870, which named it Stanley Barracks in 1893.

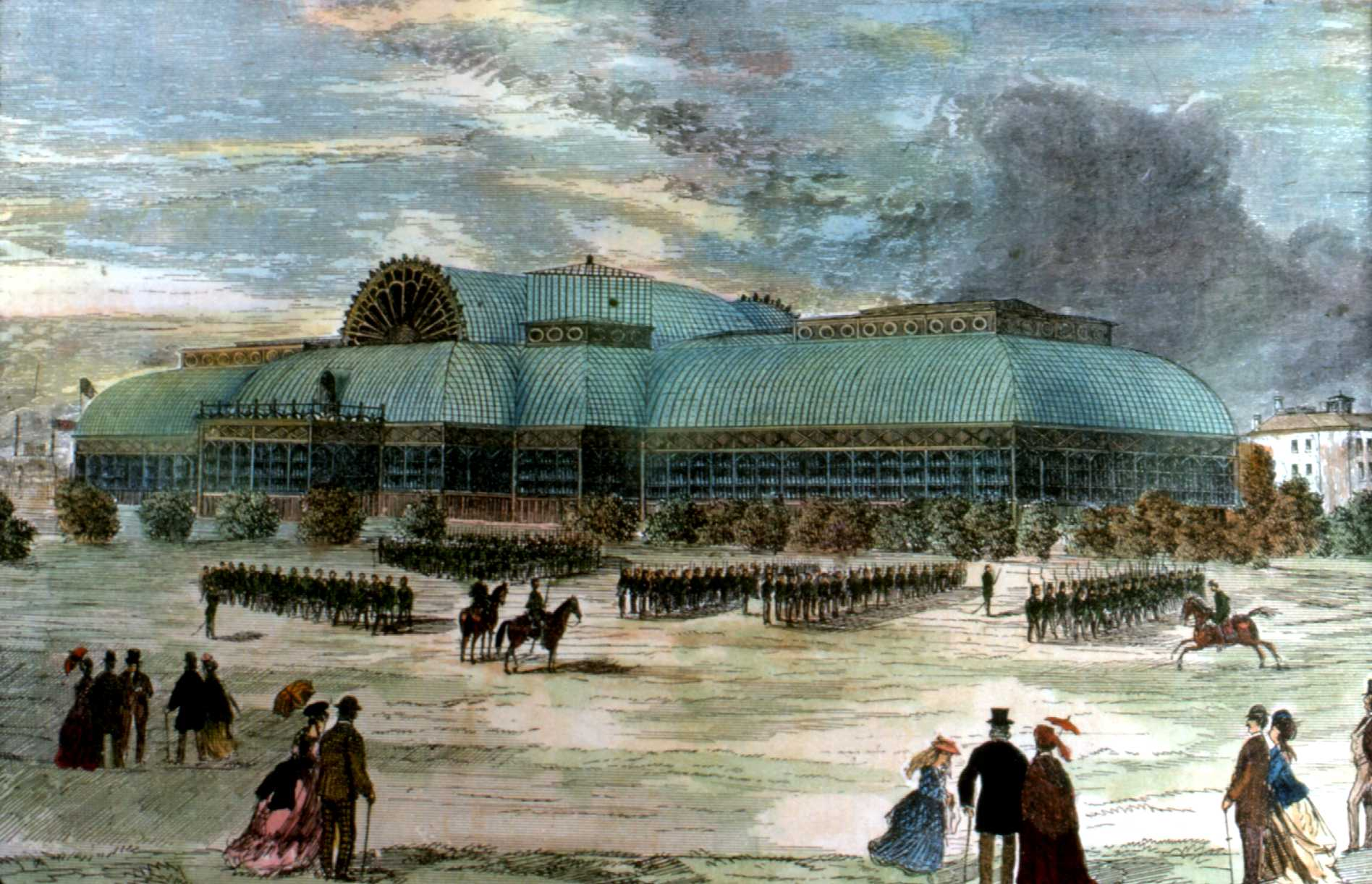
The Palace of Industry, designed after the Crystal Palace in London, was erected for the 1858 fair.

The Provincial Agricultural Association and the Board of Agriculture for Canada West inaugurated the Provincial Agricultural Fair of Canada West in 1846, to be held annually in different localities. For the 1858 fair, to be held in Toronto, a permanent "Palace of Industry" exhibition building, based on London's Crystal Palace, was built at King and Shaw Streets in what is now Liberty Village. The site held four more fairs until the 1870s when the City of Toronto government decided the exhibition had outgrown the site. The City signed a lease with the Government of Canada for a section of the western end of the reserve in April 1878. The Palace of Industry was moved to a site on the reserve near today's Horticulture Building, reconstructed and expanded. The City sold the King and Shaw site to the Massey Manufacturing Company.

The 1878 Provincial Agricultural Fair was held on the grounds. When Ottawa was chosen to host the 1879 fair, Toronto decided to hold its own fair. First called the Toronto Industrial Exhibition, it was held in the Crystal Palace and temporary buildings. At first, the eastern part of the site was still reserved for military purposes, the exhibition held on the western part of the reserve, where many of the oldest exhibit buildings are located. As time went by, more and more of the reserve was taken over for exhibition purposes, including a horse track and grandstand, and exhibit buildings.

=== Development of permanent buildings ===
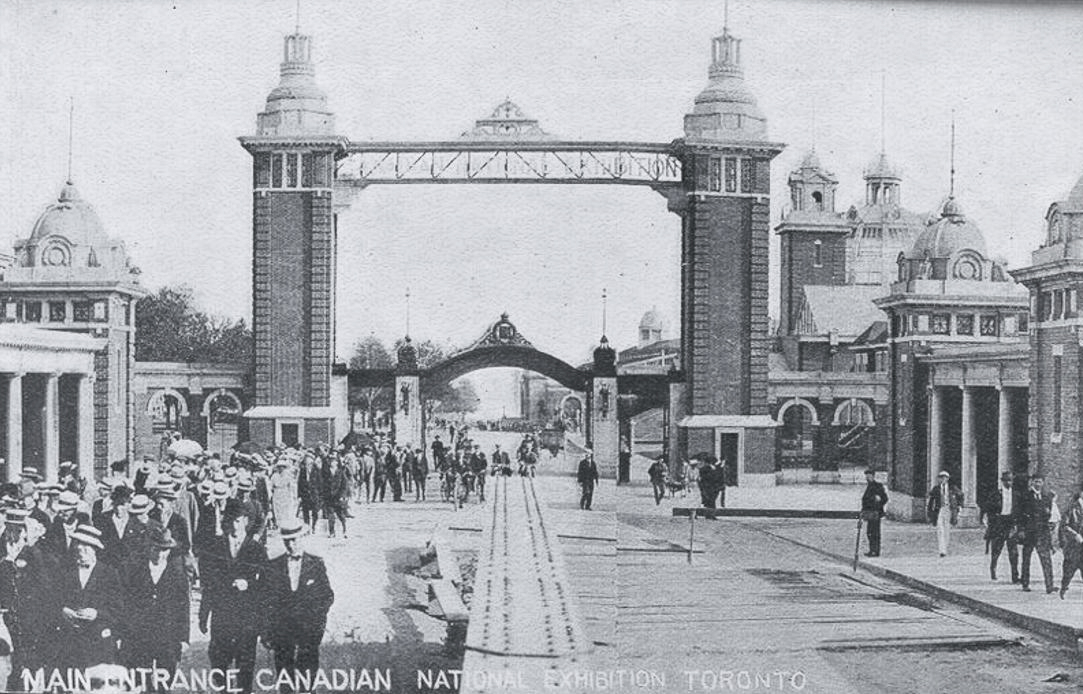
The Dufferin Gates was replaced with a more elaborate archway in 1910.

In 1902, after the Government of Canada announced it would sponsor the exhibition at the site in 1903, the Toronto City Council decided to rebuild the exhibition site. In 1903, the Government of Canada reached an agreement to transfer the remaining military reserve to the City of Toronto. Under the agreement, military uses were permitted to continue until such time that replacement facilities were built. Included in this was Old Fort York, which the City committed to preserve. The building campaign saw the building of fifteen permanent buildings designed by architect G. W. Gouinlock from 1903 until 1912, including the surviving Press Building, Horticulture Building, Government Building, Music Building and Fire Hall / Police Station. The new buildings were elaborately designed and set in an attractively landscaped site. The 1903 exhibition was the first known as the Canadian National Exhibition. The five remaining buildings were declared a historic site in 1988.

Several of the older buildings were lost to fire during this time, including the first Grandstand and the Crystal Palace (known as the Transportation Building) in 1906. In 1910, the Dufferin Gates was replaced with a more elaborate arch and out-buildings on each side.

During World War I, the Government Building was used as a barracks for soldiers, and a tent camp was set up on the site of the current Ontario Government Building (now Liberty Grand). The Dufferin Gates was guarded by soldiers. The Stanley Barracks was also used as a prisoners-of-war and "enemy aliens" internment camp. The internment camp served as an intake centre; those interned at the Barracks stayed there temporarily before being moved to other camps.

When the CNE became the world's largest annual fair in 1920, a 50-year plan was launched following the urban design and architectural precedents of the 1893 World's Columbian Exposition in Chicago. Chapman and Oxley prepared the 1920 plan, which emphasized Beaux-Arts architecture and City Beautiful urban design. The Empire Court was to be a monumental central space with a triumphal arch and gates and monumental exhibition buildings with courtyards.

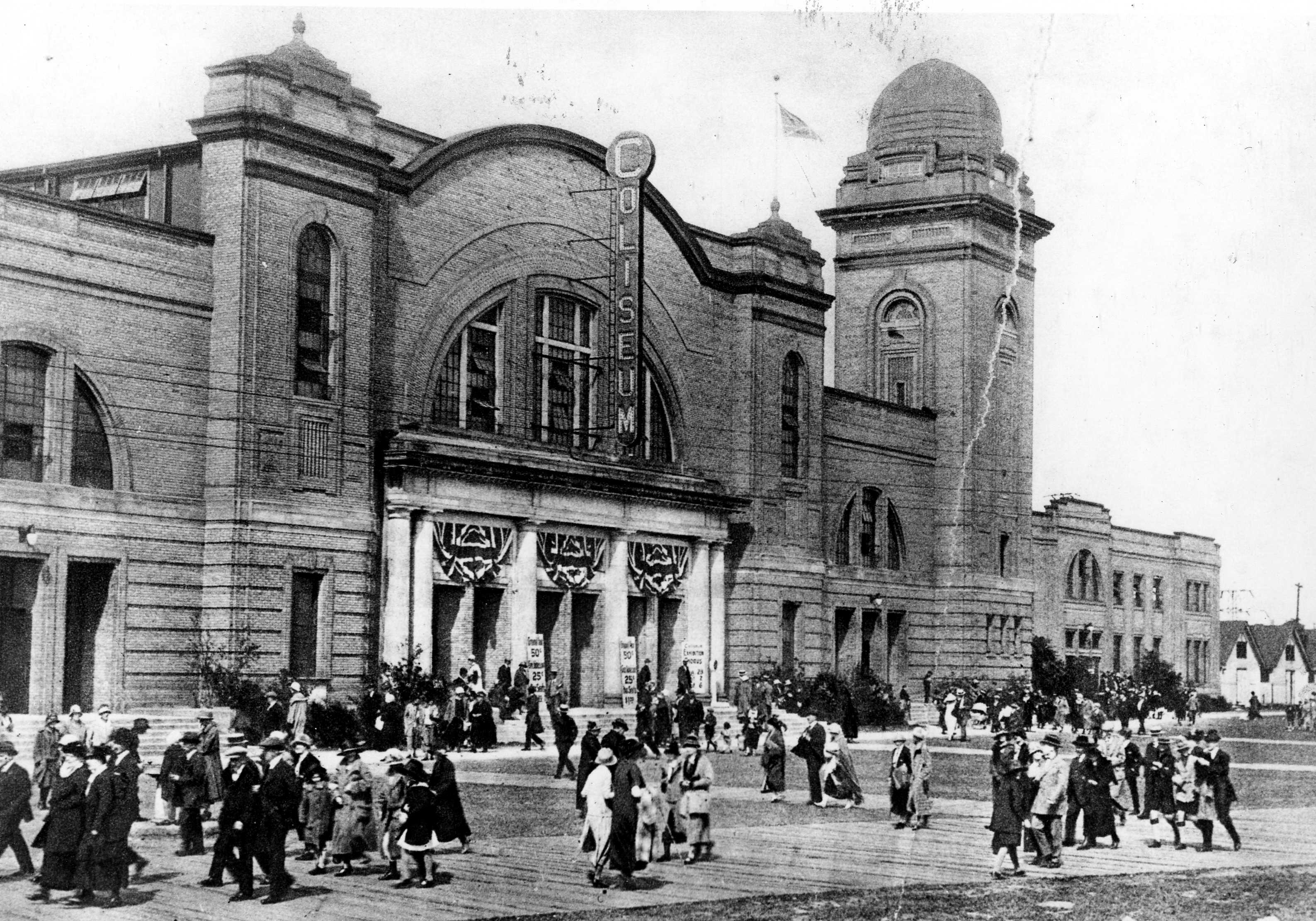
The Coliseum was opened in 1921 to host the Royal Agricultural Winter Fair.

During the 1920s, the exhibition grounds were expanded to the west and to the east, as well as to the south, where reclaimed land was used to build Lake Shore Boulevard (originally "Boulevard Drive"), connecting downtown with Toronto's growing western suburbs. The Coliseum, to host the new Royal Agricultural Winter Fair, was opened in 1921, followed by the Government of Ontario Building in 1926, the Princes' Gates in 1927, and the Electrical and Engineering Building in 1928. By the 1930s, the Beaux-Arts style faded in popularity. The start of the trend for a new style of architecture arguably became evident in the construction of the Automotive Building in 1929, the first building that moved away from the Beaux-Art architecture envisioned by the 1920 plan, mixing clean modern lines with classical ornamentation. In 1931, the Horse Palace was built, replacing temporary stables used for the Winter Fair. The Horse Palace used Art Deco ornamentation. In 1936, the Art Deco Bandshell was constructed for open-air music concerts.

During the Second World War, the exhibition grounds became Toronto's main military training grounds. The CNE, and virtually all other non-military uses of the lands ceased. The CNE was not held between 1942 and 1946, when the land and its facilities were turned over to the Department of National Defence as a training ground. The Graphic Arts Building housed Red Cross facilities, the Coliseum became the RCAF Manning Depot, the Horse Palace was used for barracks and the Automotive Building became the shore facility HMCS York for the Royal Canadian Navy. After World War II, the buildings were used as a demobilization centre. The CNE would resume again in 1947, as the Canadian military returned the grounds back to its civilian administrators.

=== Post World War II ===
After the military vacated Stanley Barracks, the CNE made plans for the Barracks' demolition. However, until 1951, the buildings were used for emergency housing. The first phase of demolition in 1951 demolished all of the wooden buildings, leaving only the original stone buildings. In 1953, despite public opposition, three of the remaining four stone buildings were demolished for parking, leaving only the Officers' Quarters. In 1955, the Quarters found its first CNE use, for Sports Hall of Fame exhibits before being turned into a year-round Maritime Museum in 1959.

A new phase of building construction followed, replacing buildings destroyed by fire, demolished for the Gardiner Expressway, or needed expansions. The new buildings, mostly in the central block of the site, exhibited a new Modernist style of architecture. In 1946, the third Grandstand burned down. In its place was built the fourth Grandstand, a massive concrete construction and monumental cantilevered steel roof was a sharp contrast to the other buildings around it. The Modernist trend continued with the construction of other buildings and monuments typifying the modernist style including the Food Building (1954), the Shell Oil Tower (1955), Queen Elizabeth Building (1957) and the Princess Margaret Fountain (1958).

In the later 1950s, the new six-lane Gardiner Expressway was pushed through the north side of the grounds, cut below grade in the western section of the grounds, and an elevated section in the eastern section. This necessitated the demolition of the Dufferin Gate, the Women's Rest building and the Machinery Hall. The new parabolic arch Dufferin Gate was built in 1959.

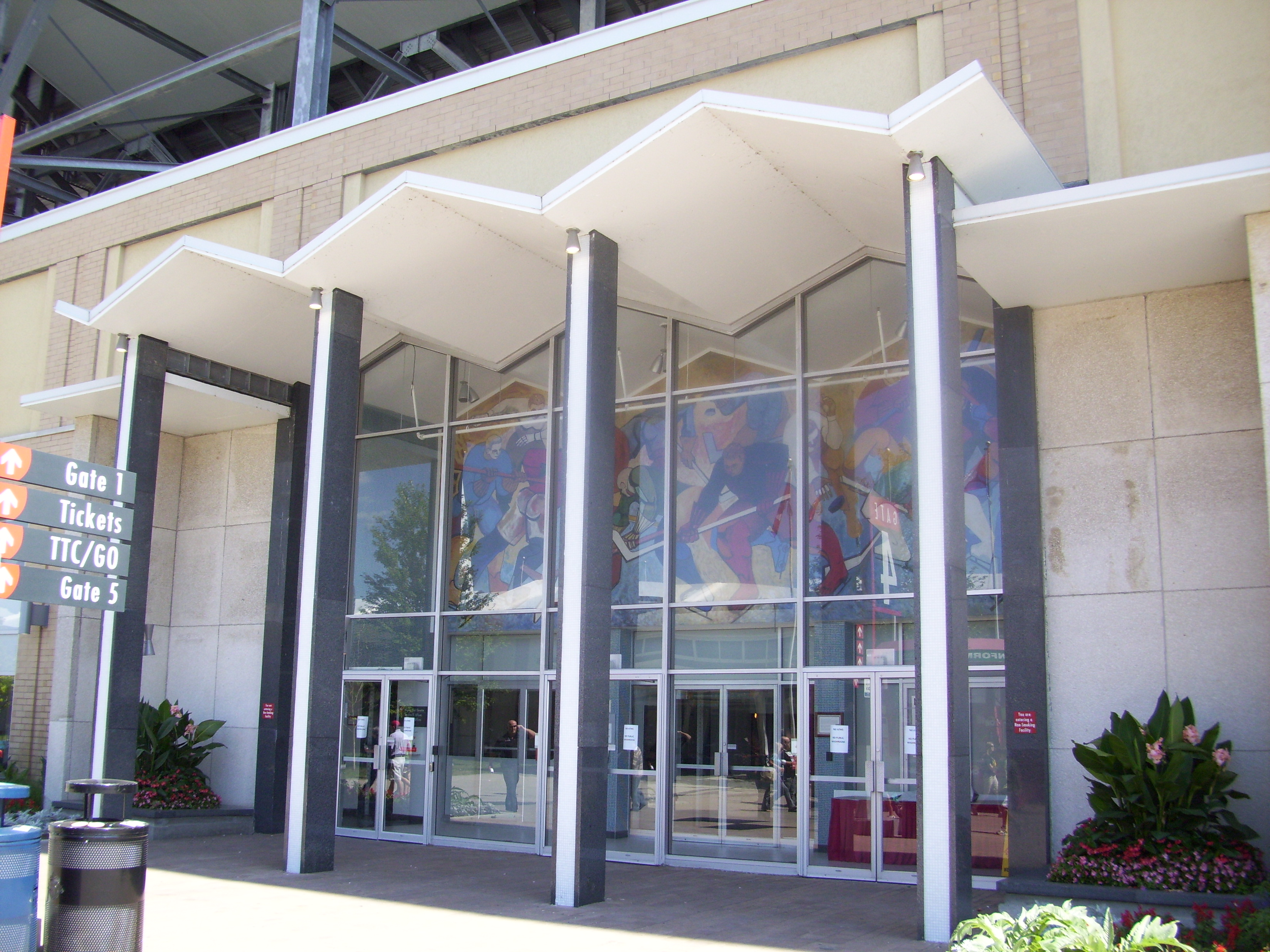
Remnant of Hall of Fame building facade at BMO Field. The building housed Canada's Sports Hall of Fame from 1961 to 2006.

On January 3, 1961, the Manufacturer's Building and the Women's Building (the one built prior to the Queen Elizabeth Building) were destroyed by fire. The buildings were replaced by the Better Living Centre, which came with a distinctive Mondrian-inspired ornament on its roof. In 1961, the Hall of Fame building opened north of the Grandstand to house Canada's Sports Hall of Fame and the Hockey Hall of Fame. In 1963, the Coliseum was re-clad with a modernist south facade. To replace its exhibit in the Ontario Government Building, the Government of Ontario built Ontario Place on artificial islands to the south of Exhibition Place (accessible via two foot bridges).

Coinciding with the opening of the ultra-modern Ontario Place to the south, a new master plan for the Exhibition site was developed in 1971. The 1971 Master Plan was radical, calling for the demolition of many pre-World War II buildings, new Modernist buildings, and a massive central public space with a reflecting pool and fountains on the site of Exhibition Stadium, which was to be relocated. The plan proposed the demolition of the Fire Station, Art Gallery, General Exhibits Building, Railways Building, Government Building, Ontario Government Building, Automotive Building, Transportation Building, Band Shell, Grandstand, Shell Tower and the 1959 Dufferin Gate. A monorail was proposed to move people around the site and to and from the parking lots. It had first been proposed to connect Union Station and the Exhibition Grounds. Dufferin Street was to be connected to Lake Shore Boulevard, a new four-lane road along the north of the site and a new 1800-place parking lot taking the place of buildings to the west of Dufferin.

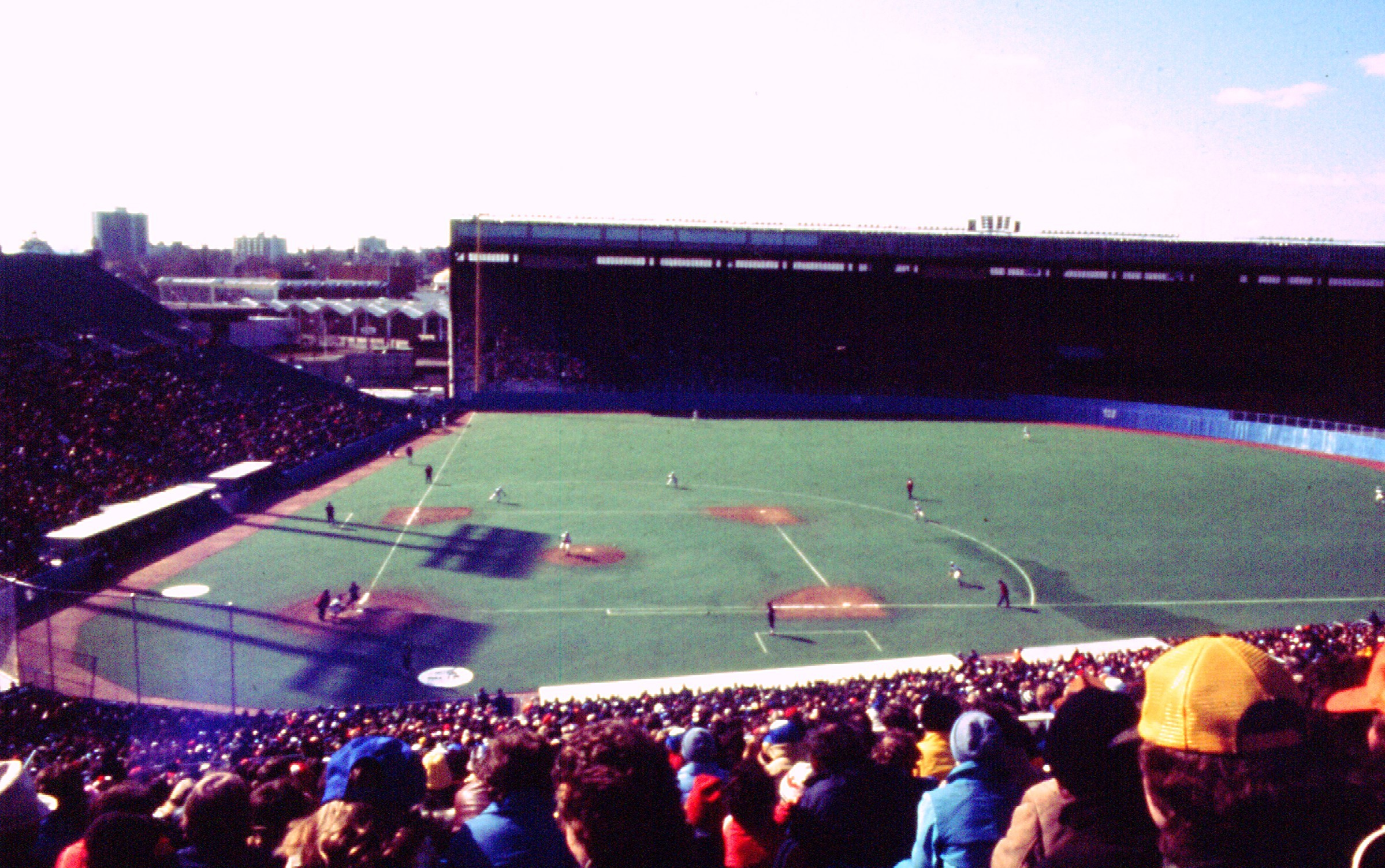
Redeveloped Exhibition Stadium in 1977, during the second game played by the Toronto Blue Jays.

The plan resulted in some demolition, such as the Electrical and Engineering Building in 1972 (allegedly in poor structural condition) and the General Exhibits Building and Art Gallery, which were in the path of the new road. In 1974, the International Building, (formerly the Transportation Building), to the west of the bandshell, burnt down. It was hosting an exhibit on Spain during the CNE when it caught fire and was destroyed. The building was demolished and not replaced, the site left vacant and has since used mostly as a parking lot. The 1971 plan was abandoned after Exhibition Stadium was redeveloped and enlarged to host Major League Baseball in 1977. The site officially became Exhibition Place, partly in recognition that very little of the site was retained as parklands.

In 1978, to celebrate the centenary of the fair, a copy of the original 1913 music bandstand was built on the site of the original in the park north of the Horticulture Building. North of the park a new structure designed to resemble the 1870s-era exhibition buildings was added. The buildings host mostly children's activities during the CNE. The park was renamed Centennial Square and is also used for corporate picnics.

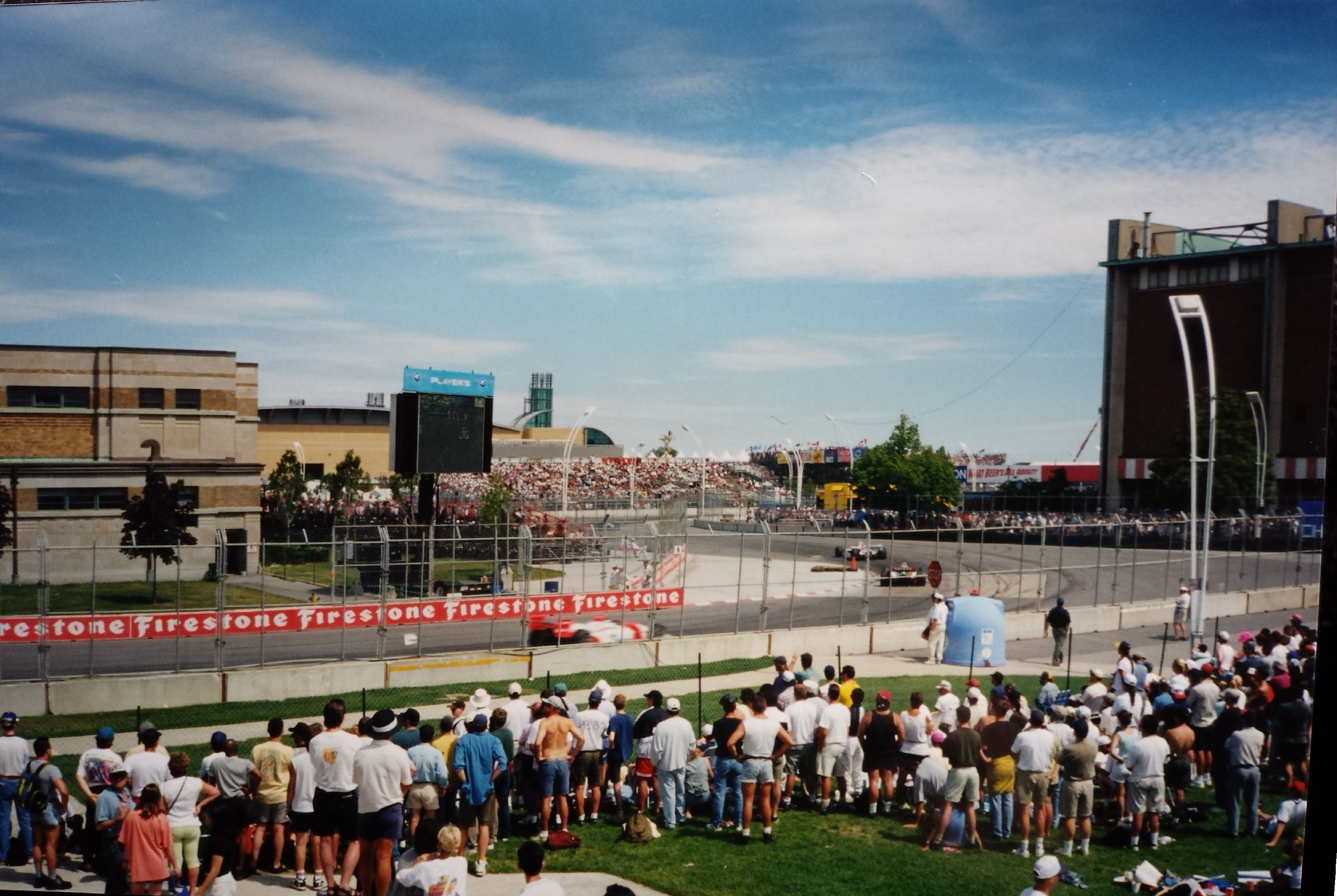
The 1997 Molson Indy at Exhibition Place. The annual IndyCar race was first organized at the site in 1986.

In 1986, the streets were turned into a high-speed open-wheel car racing circuit for the first time. The race, known today as the Honda Indy Toronto, has taken place annually since, and is part of the IndyCar Series. The streets of Exhibition Place are closed off to regular traffic and a closed circuit is made through the grounds and along Lake Shore Boulevard. The race meant the end of the landmark Bulova/Shell Oil observation tower.

In 1987, the Music Building, which had closed due to structural problems, was gutted by fire. The 1907 exterior was restored and a new interior was built.

=== New emphasis on year-round use ===
In the 1990s, budget pressures on the City of Toronto led to a new emphasis on the self-sufficiency of Exhibition Place. It saw the tear-down of the permanent midway buildings and the Flyer roller coaster. The City planned to charge rent to the midway's operator, Conklin Shows, which chose to tear down the buildings instead and set up temporary rides each year for the CNE.

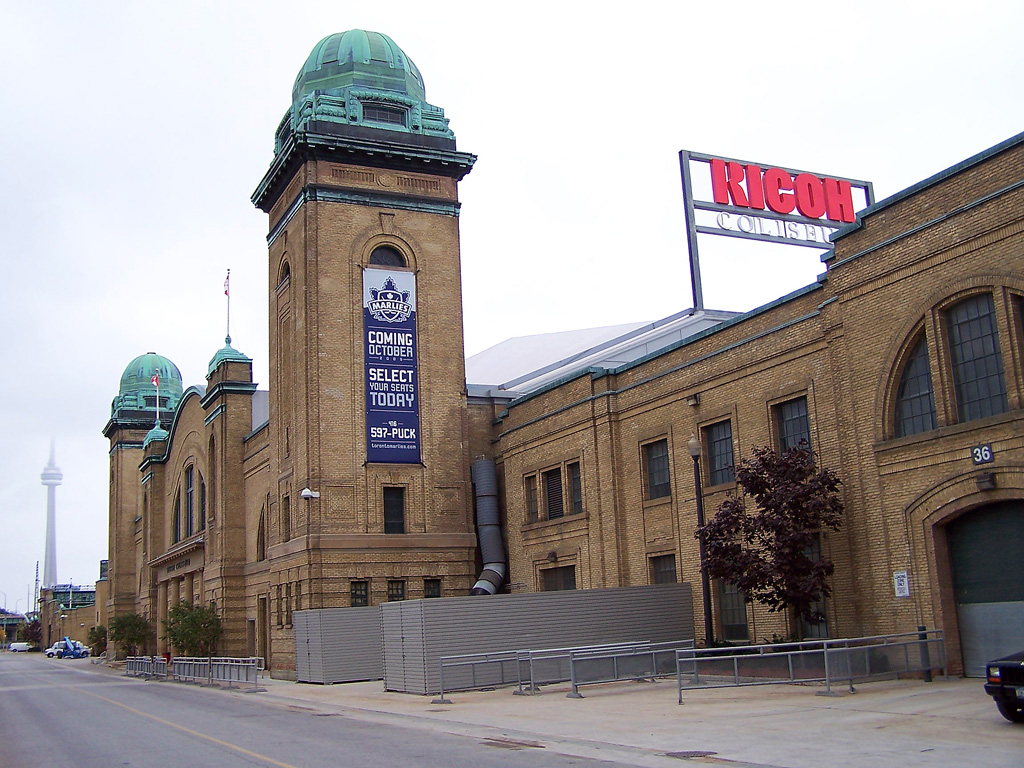
The Toronto Marlies of the AHL, moved into Coca-Cola Coliseum in 2003.

The new National Trade Centre (now the Enercare Centre) trade show building, planned since the 1971 plan, was built on the vacant Electrical Building site to host more and larger trade shows year-round. It incorporated the Coliseum and Annex buildings to create one large exhibit space. In 2003, the Coliseum (now the Coca-Cola Coliseum) was rebuilt and expanded to provide a home for professional ice hockey. It is currently the home of the Toronto Marlies team from October to April each year.

The trend to utilize the grounds year-round to cover the grounds' expense, continued with the rental of the Arts & Crafts Building to the Medieval Times theatre company, the Ontario Government Building was rented to become event space known as "Liberty Grand", and the Horticulture Building became a night club known as "Muzik." The Automotive Building was turned over to private management and is used exclusively for private events and conferences & has become known as the "Beanfield Centre" since 2017 by virtue of a naming rights agreement.

In 1999, Exhibition Stadium, mostly vacant after the opening of the downtown SkyDome stadium, was demolished. The site was vacant until 2007, when the new BMO Field soccer stadium, a public-private partnership, was built on the site to bring Major League Soccer to Toronto. The new soccer stadium also meant the end of the Hall of Fame building. The Hockey Hall of Fame had vacated earlier for downtown Toronto. A portion of the Hall of Fame façade was retained as one of the entrances to the new stadium. As a demonstration project, a WindShare wind turbine was built to the west of the Fort Rouillé site. The wind turbine has since been renamed ExPlace Wind Turbine.

During the 2000s, the Exhibition Place grounds has seen several proposals for new uses. In July 2005, the City of Toronto asked for aquarium proposals from private enterprises. The only two respondents, Ripley Entertainment and Oceanus Holdings, suggested that they would be interested provided the location was closer downtown or had better transit access and parking. When the City of Toronto was considering the construction of a permanent casino, the CNE was the site of several proposals. The aquarium was built next to the CN tower and the City chose not to build a permanent casino.

Two new buildings have been added at Exhibition Place. In the north-west corner, the Toronto Raptors basketball team built the Biosteel Centre (now the OVO Athletic Centre), a practice facility which is shared part-time with the community. In the south-east, along Lake Shore Boulevard, the Hotel X Toronto was constructed on the site of New Fort York. The foundations of several of the New Fort York buildings were revealed as part of the development. The hotel was built to complement the facilities of the Enercare and Allstream Centres. The soccer stadium was recently expanded, and adapted to allow it to host the Canadian Football League's Toronto Argonauts.

=== Other events ===
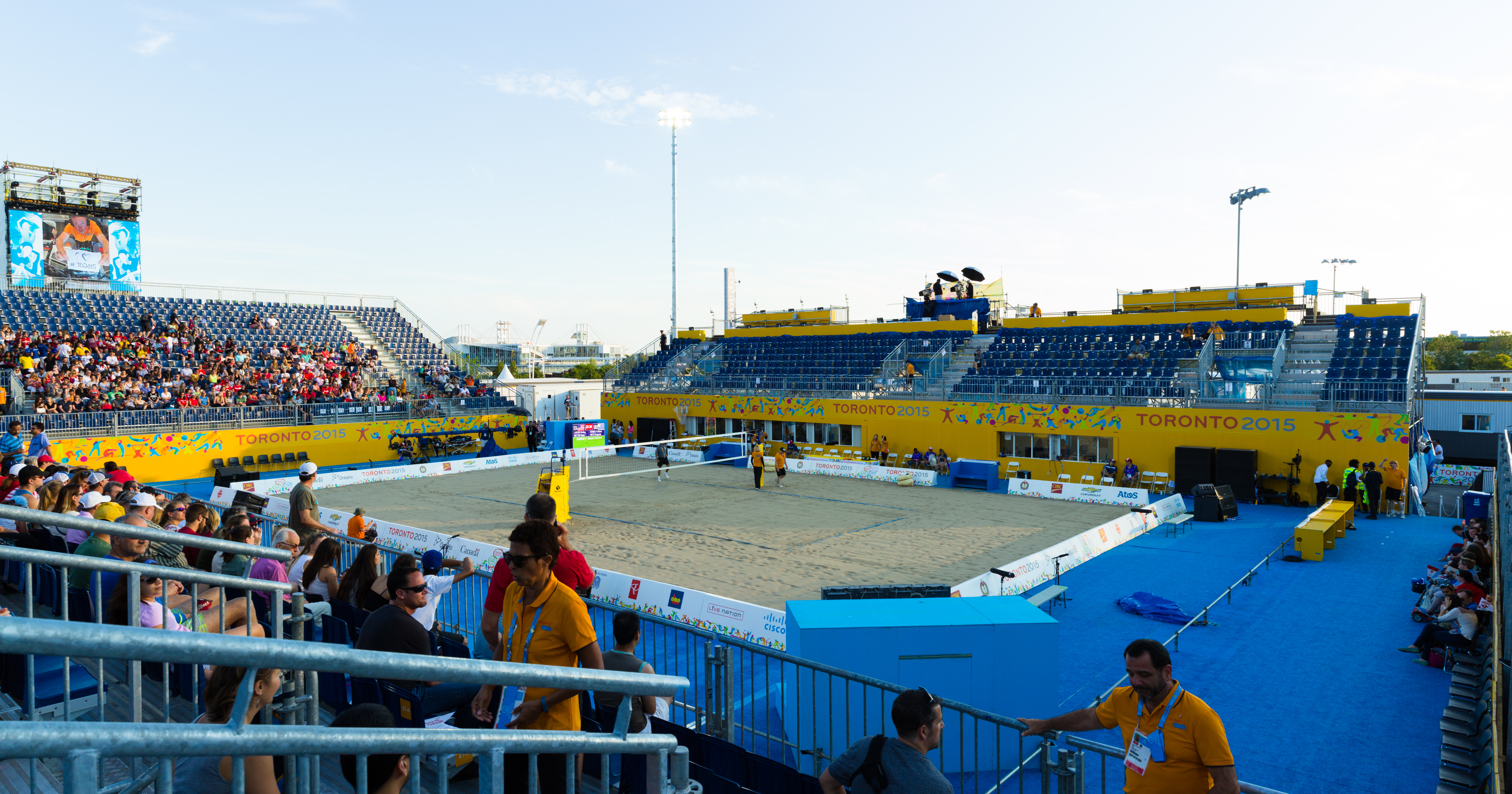
The Chevrolet Beach Volleyball Centre at Exhibition Place. The centre, along with other facilities at Exhibition Place was used as event venues for the 2015 Pan American Games.

In July 2015, Exhibition Place was the site of sporting venues for the 2015 Pan American and Parapan American Games. The collection of sites was referred to as "CIBC Pan Am Park" and each building was given a venue name. The Enercare Centre and Coliseum buildings were used for indoor sports, temporary facilities for beach volleyball were built south of BMO Field, and a watercourse was laid out on Lake Ontario. As a result of the games, the 2015 Toronto Honda Indy was scheduled in June to allow for time for the site to prepare for the Pan Am Games. As well, the site was wound down in time for setup for the 2015 Canadian National Exhibition. The site would also be used during the 2026 FIFA World Cup.

== Buildings ==
While the CNE only lasts for a few weeks at the end of the summer, many major permanent buildings and other structures have been built over the years. Most are used for other purposes throughout the year.

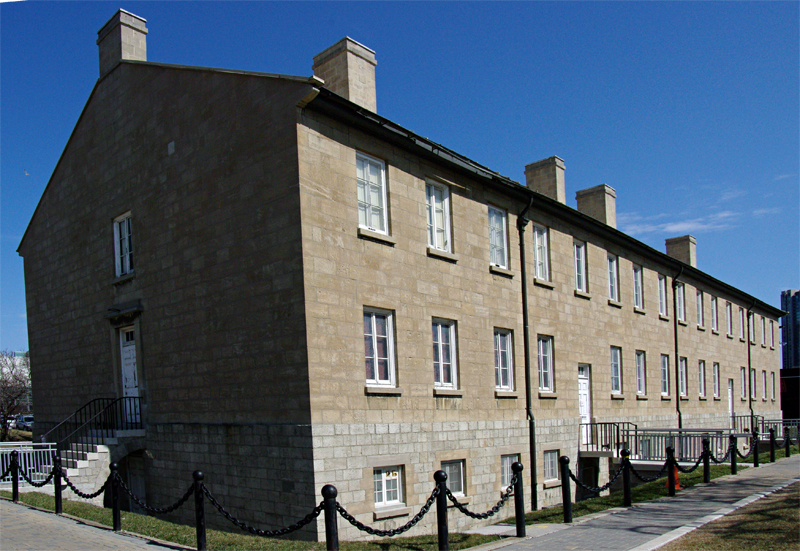
Stanley Barracks Officers' Quarters. Erected in 1840, the building is the last remaining structure of New Fort York, a military installation that predates Exhibition Place.

The west end of the grounds is the original site of exhibitions and the oldest buildings are located here. There are five purpose-built fair buildings designed by architect G. W. Gouinlock: the Horticulture Building, built in 1907; the Government Building, built in 1912; the Music Building, built in 1907; the Administration Building, built in 1905; and the Fire Hall/Police Station, built in 1912. Just south of Dufferin Gate is Centennial Square, a green space with a bandstand. The Ontario Government Building was added later in 1926. The Bandshell, modeled after the famed Art Deco Hollywood Bowl was built in 1936, replacing a 1906 bandstand. North of the Bandshell is Bandshell Park, a large open green space for gatherings. Near the Bandshell is the 1790s Scadding Cabin, the only building dating to the 1879 inaugural exhibition. There are two large fountains; the Princess Margaret Fountain and the Shrine Monument Fountain south of the Bandshell. To the west of Bandshell park, the former International Building site is now a parking lot, and there is a parking lot in the north-west corner of the site.

The central block contains more recent 1950-1960s buildings, which are all replacements for earlier buildings, and are larger than the buildings to the west: the Better Living Centre (exhibition space), the Queen Elizabeth Building complex (theatre, exhibition and administration sections) and the Food Building. The BMO Field soccer stadium, built in 2007, is situated on the site of the 1947 Grandstand and the 1961 Halls of Fame building. South of BMO Field is a large open parking lot and midway area. The CNE plans to make the area a public square, and move the parking underground. South of the central section are two pedestrian bridges over Lake Shore Boulevard to the Ontario Place complex.

The east block was the most active area of military usage and retains the only military building left on the site, the Stanley Barracks Officers' Quarters, dating to the 1840s. The area is a mix of buildings, including the older Coliseum, Horse Palace and newer buildings. The section is dominated by the exhibition complex of the Enercare Centre, Coliseum and the Industry Building. The Horse Palace (which adjoins the Coliseum and is used for equine shows and quartering), the Automotive Building (which was once used for car shows and is now a conference centre) and the General Services Building are all older exhibition buildings dating from the 1920s. The new "Hotel X" project includes a display of foundations of New Fort York which once occupied part of the site.

=== Sports venues ===
Exhibition Place was also home to Exhibition Stadium, which was built out of the fourth Grandstand by adding two extra wings of seats. The original grandstand had been constructed in the late 1800s and was re-modelled, replaced, or destroyed over the years. It served as home to the CFL's Toronto Argonauts between 1958 and 1988 and the Toronto Blue Jays (AL) between 1977 and 1989. The two teams left for SkyDome (now Rogers Centre) in 1989. After it lost many stadium concert tours to Rogers Centre, and many other outdoor concerts to the nearby Budweiser Stage (then known as Molson Amphitheatre) at Ontario Place, its usefulness was at an end. The stadium was demolished in 1999 to serve as parking and allow a more sprawling midway. However, on October 26, 2005, the City of Toronto approved the construction of a 20,000 seat soccer stadium (BMO Field) on Exhibition Place land.

==== Exhibition Stadium (former stadium) ====
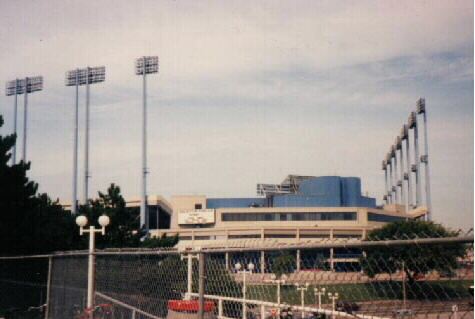
Exterior of Exhibition Stadium in 1992, several years before it was demolished.

The CNE has been host to four grandstands since its inception. The third grandstand, designed by G. W. Gouinlock, was built in 1907 and had a capacity of 16,000. It burned down in 1946, subsequently leading to the construction of the fourth (known as CNE Grandstand), built in 1948. Designed by architects Marani and Morris, this building was the first of what would prove to be several Modernist buildings built on the CNE grounds, its distinctive and bold cantilevered truss roof dominating the grounds for over 50 years. It initially housed 22,000 people, but was expanded over the years to a maximum of 54,000 in order to accommodate the additional seating required for major professional sports teams who made CNE Grandstand their home. It became the home base for the Toronto Argonauts football team, and later, to the Toronto Blue Jays baseball team. Architect Bill Sanford designed the alterations for baseball in 1976.

A stock car race held on the grounds marked a historical race; on July 18, 1958, Richard Petty made his NASCAR Grand National Series debut at Exhibition Stadium.

In addition to sports, CNE Grandstand was the stage for many entertainers over the years. Famous comedians who were featured there included Bob Hope, Victor Borge, and Bill Cosby. Similarly, many well-known musical acts made an appearance at the venue, ranging from Duke Ellington, Guy Lombardo, Benny Goodman, The Beach Boys (appearing there 11 times between 1974 and 1990), The Monkees, Sonny & Cher, to Melissa Etheridge, The Who, Simon & Garfunkel, Sinéad O'Connor, Billy Idol, Nine Inch Nails and Tina Turner. After the grandstand was demolished, open-air concerts during the CNE have been held at the Bandshell.

The Blue Jays and Argos left the open-air Exhibition Stadium for the retractable roofed Skydome (now, the Rogers Centre) in 1989. By that time it was recognized that the building was beginning to visibly decay, and was little used in its final decade of existence. Though it was the earliest of the modernist-style buildings on the grounds, it was the only one not to become a historically listed building. It was finally demolished in 1999.

==== BMO Field (current stadium) ====
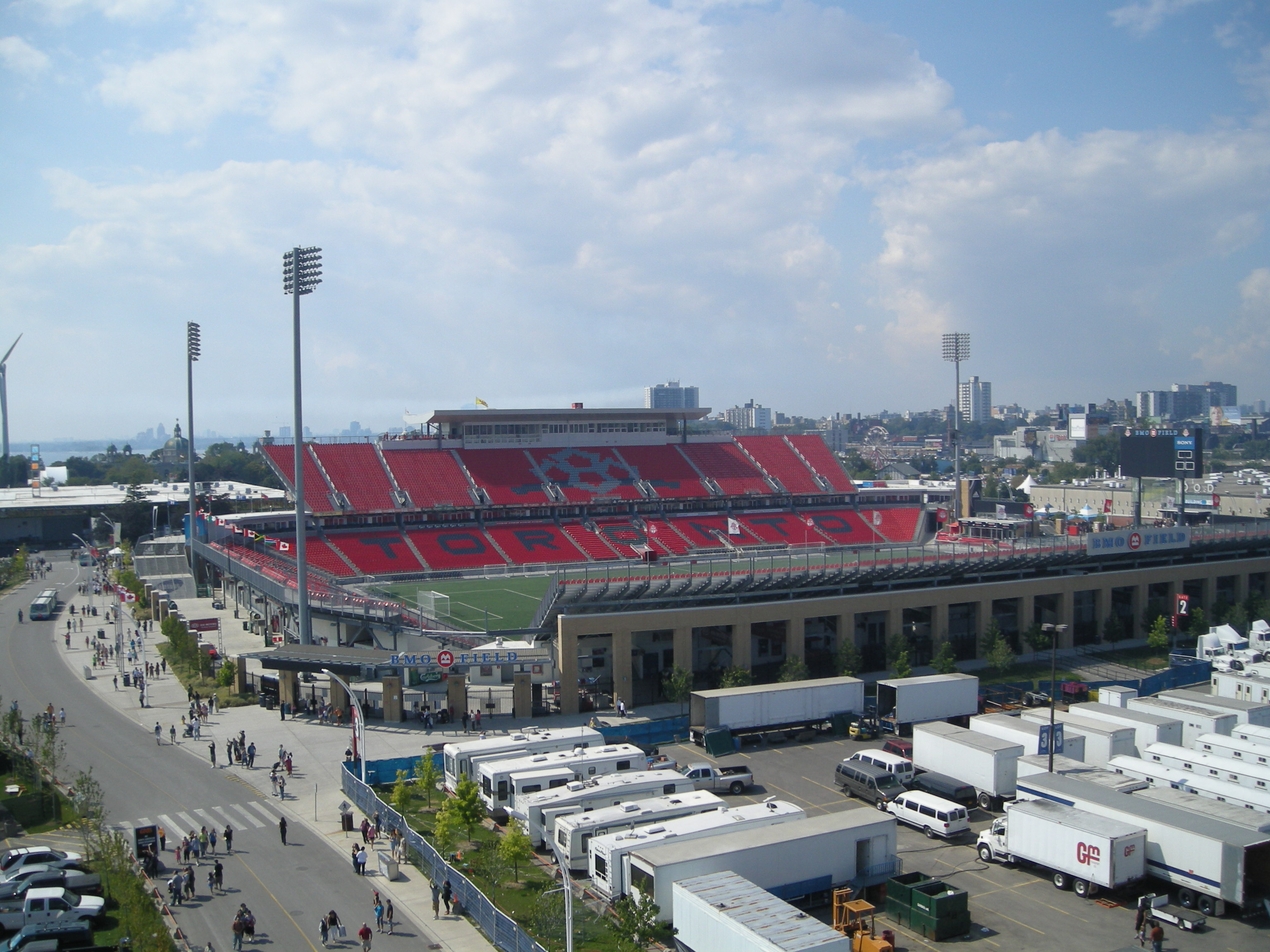
BMO Field is an outdoor field located at Exhibition Place.

In 2007, the open-air BMO Field soccer-specific stadium was constructed on the site of the former Exhibition Stadium and the Canada Sports Hall of Fame buildings. The Hall of Fame building had been vacated by the Hockey Hall of Fame and was demolished to make way for the stadium. The stadium was built to host Toronto FC, the Major League Soccer (MLS) team as well as the Canadian national soccer team. Capacity is approximately 31,000 people. It opened on April 28, 2007, the start of the 2007 MLS season. Under the FIFA-sanctioned name "National Soccer Stadium", it was the center-piece venue for the 2007 FIFA U-20 World Cup. It was expanded for the 2015 season and had a new roof installed for the 2016 season. In conjunction with the stadium construction, Princes' Boulevard was re-routed to the south of the stadium.

==== Coliseum ====
The Coliseum (1922, now part of the Enercare Centre complex) is an indoor arena. It is an example of Beaux-Arts design by City architect George F. W. Price and renovated by Brisbin Brook Beynon, Architects. Its main entrance was originally to the north, and the building was remodelled with a Modernist façade main entrance to the south in 1963. The original façade was restored when the Enercare Centre was built. It is home to the minor league Toronto Marlies professional ice hockey team during the winter months. Every November, it is used for the "Royal Horse Show" component of the Royal Agricultural Winter Fair annually in November.

==== OVO Athletic Centre ====
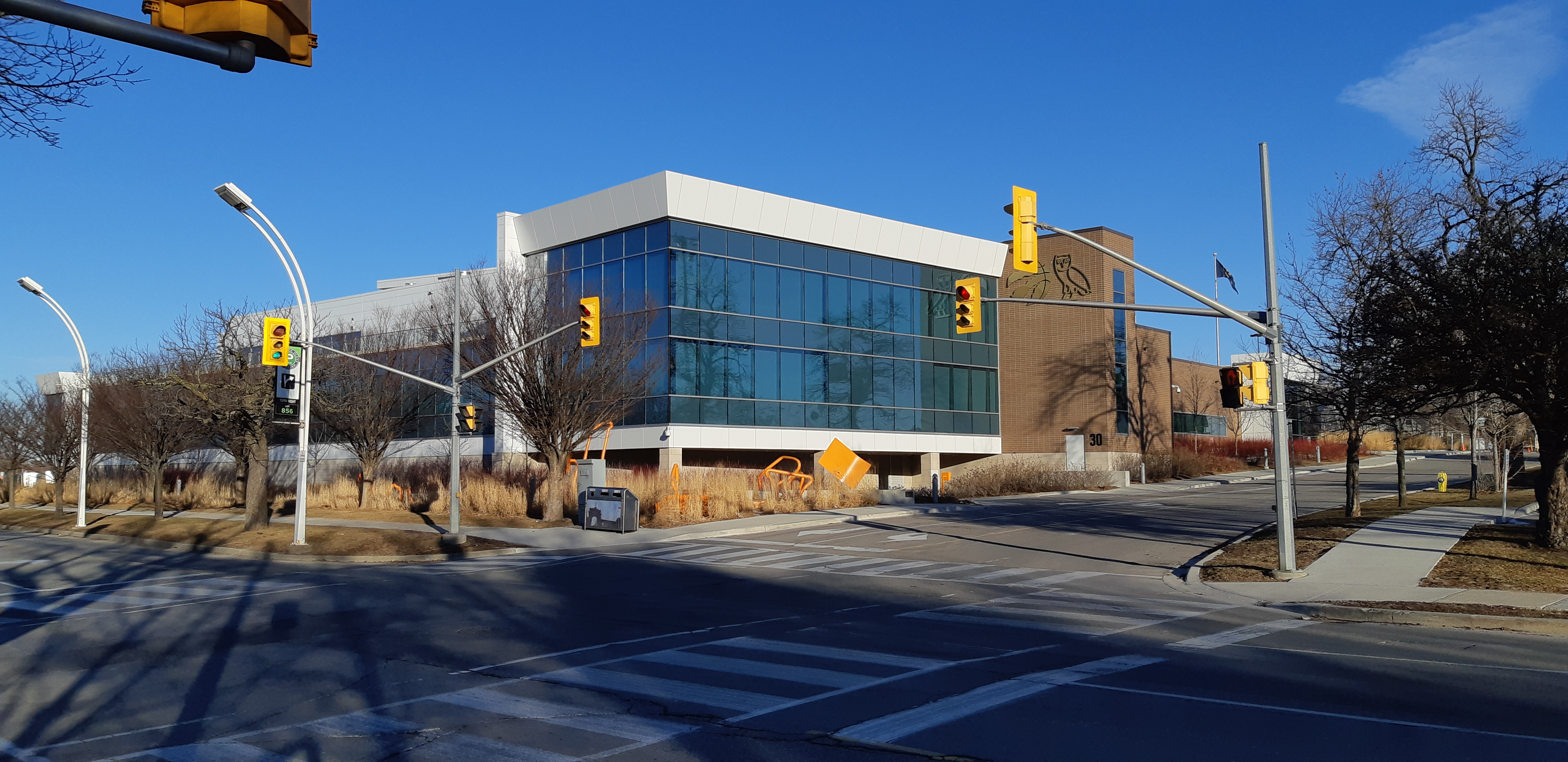
The OVO Athletic Centre was completed in 2016.

In another partnership with Maple Leaf Sports & Entertainment, the new OVO Athletic Centre (originally known as the Biosteel Centre) was completed in 2016 at the west end of Exhibition Place on parking lot lands. The facility is a practice facility for the Toronto Raptors National Basketball Association team. It has two basketball courts. The facility displaced some parkland, including a baseball diamond on the site used for a CNE tournament.

=== Exhibit buildings ===
==== Better Living Centre ====
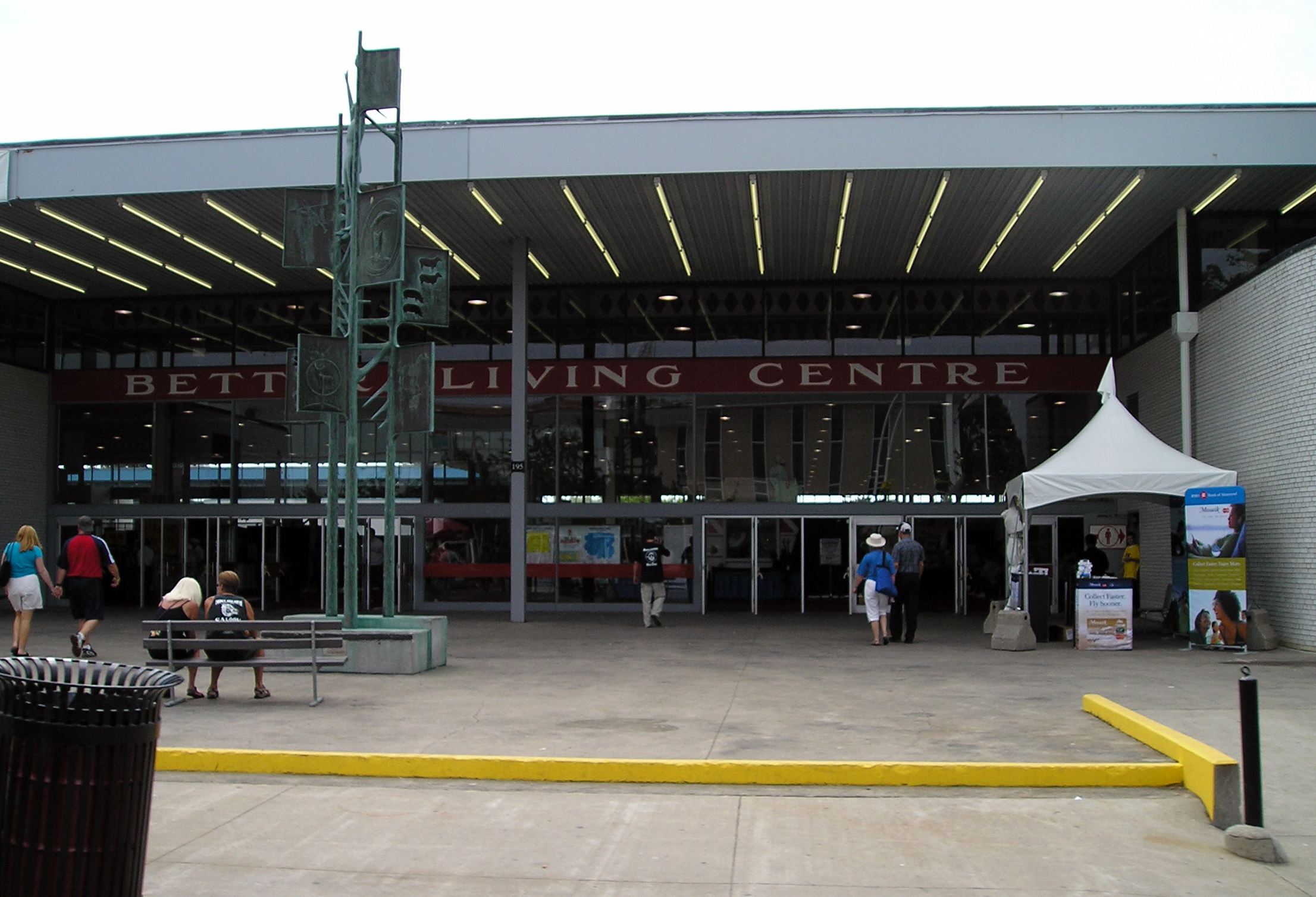
The Better Living Centre is a Modernist building opened in 1962.

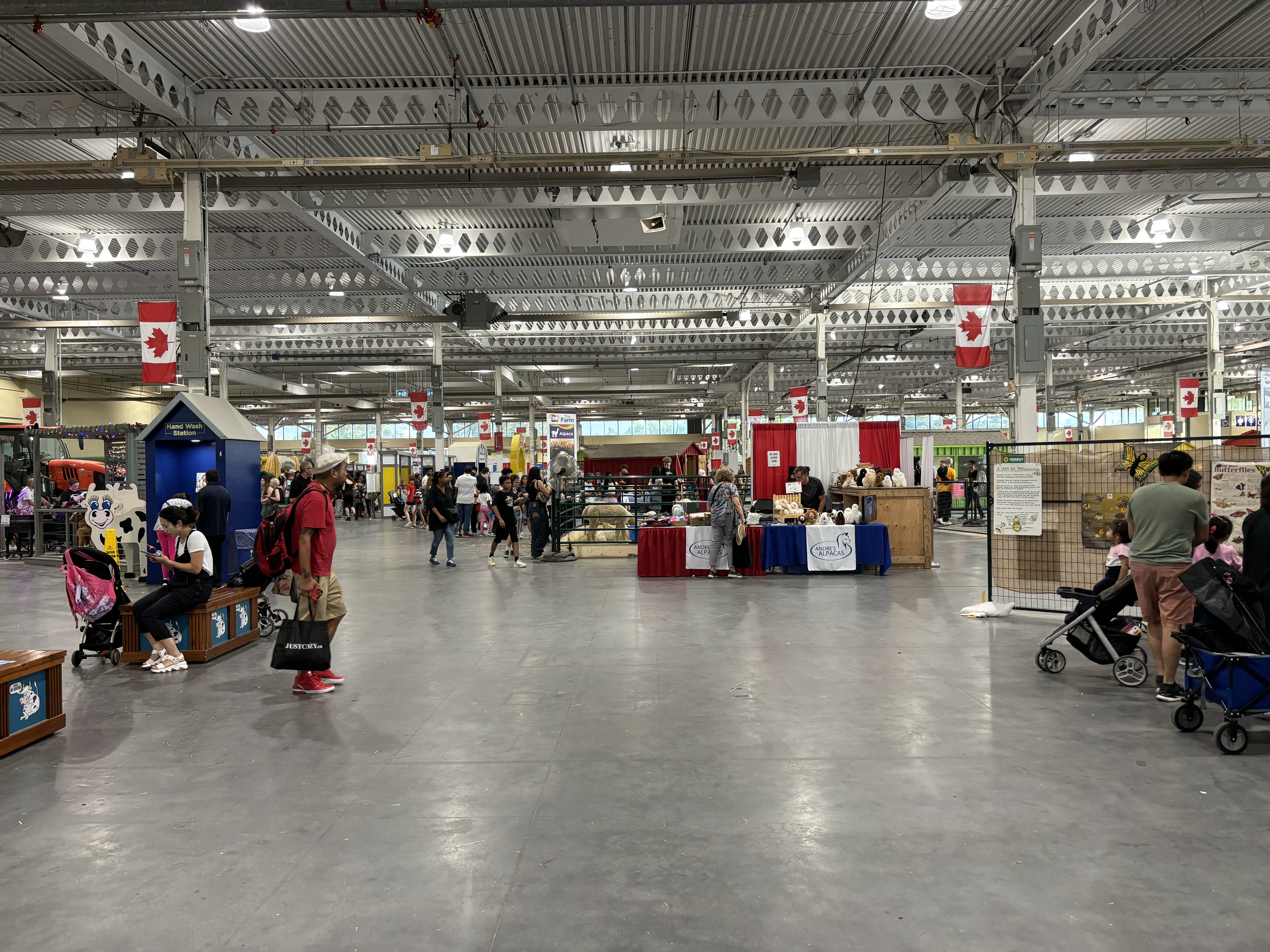
The Better Living Centre become farm pavilion during CNE

One of the Modernist buildings on the site, the original purpose of the Better Living Centre was to introduce new ranges of consumer goods to the baby boomer generation, making it a "space of encounter between consumer and product". For many people attending the CNE, the building hosted their first encounters with such technologies as colour television, transistor radios or home computers. It also became the place where people would expect to see the latest models of various consumer goods, ranging from vacuum cleaners to kitchen appliances.

The building's stark modernist architecture, made up of large white forms, a vast flat roof and harsh angles, suited its futurist themes. The building was designed by architects Marani, Morris and Allan and was opened by Toronto mayor Nathan Phillips on August 17, 1962. It was built on the former site of the Manufacturers' building, which burned down in 1961. The new building replaced the exhibit space of the Manufacturers' Building and the General Exhibit Building.

The CNE no longer uses the Better Living Centre for its original purpose of introducing consumers to the latest and greatest products during the CNE. Instead, it has been divided in two. One-half hosts the CNE Casino for the month of August, while the other half is the "Farm, Food and Fun" pavilion during the CNE.

The building is used at other times of the year for special events. It hosts an indoor amusement park during March Break and a Hallowe'en exhibit "Screamers" during the month of October.

==== Enercare Centre ====
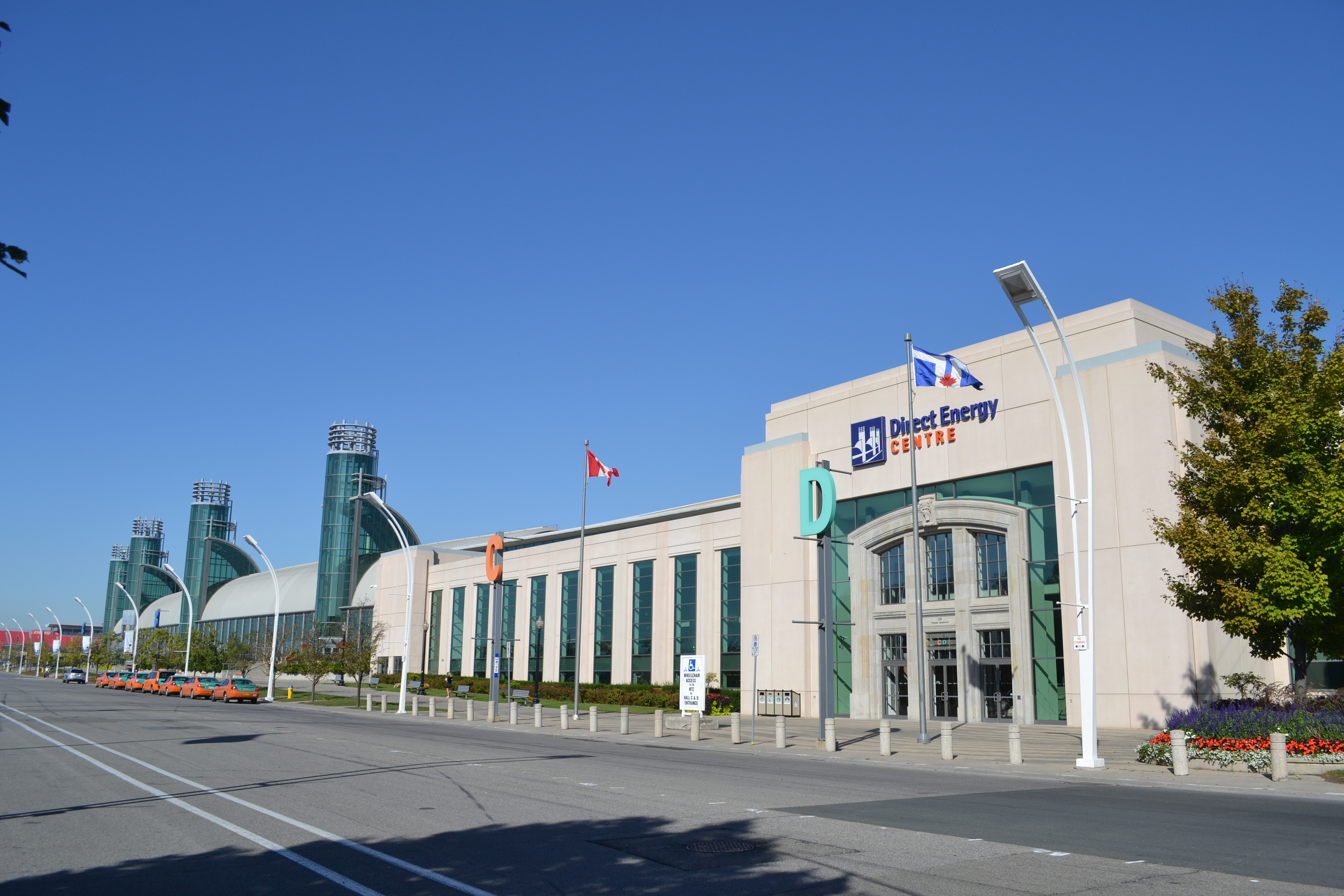
The Enercare Centre exhibition complex.

The Enercare Centre (1997), along Princes' Boulevard, has seven exhibit halls with 1,000,000 square feet (93,000 m^{2}) of space. The new building, first known as the National Trade Centre, took over the location of the old TTC streetcar loop and CNE entrance and the open space vacant since the Electrical and Engineering Building was demolished. It is interconnected with the Coliseum and the Industry Building to the north to provide one large, configurable exhibition space. Home to the Toronto International Boat Show, the National Home Show, the One of A Kind Show, and the Royal Agricultural Winter Fair. Designed by architectural teams Zeidler Partnership Architects and Dunlop-Farrow Architects. During the exhibition, the building houses international product displays and animal shows.

==== Food Building ====
The CNE Food Building (1954) was built to replace the original Pure Food Building (c. 1922 and demolished 1953). It was designed by Richard A. Fisher. Water cascades down the windows of the east and west entrances to the building. At the main entrance and west entrance, bronze fish sculptures were created by Toronto artist Jean Horne in the reflecting pool. The building is used during the CNE for booths run by various restaurants and food companies. The Food Building is used for storage during the rest of the year.

The Modernist building was the first embodiment of this architectural movement on the CNE grounds. Compared to the Pure Food Building, the contemporary building featured higher ceilings and wider aisles, to enable better circulation and comfort for CNE guests. The Food Building's Modernist features include its windowless walls, white pre-cast panels with a broomed finish on the face, and troweled borders. The Food Building was designed to showcase the products of Canada's food industry, from Laura Secord chocolates to Maple Leaf meats, and Red Rose tea, all of whom had permanent booths in the building.

When the Food Building opened, an 80 feet (24 m) stainless-steel pylon graced the south entrance of the building. The inspiration for the pylon came from Trylon, a signature structure at the 1939 World's Fair in New York City. The needle was an integral part of the new Food Building's design. However, over time, rust and decay eroded the tall pylon and it was dismantled in 1975.

==== Queen Elizabeth Building ====
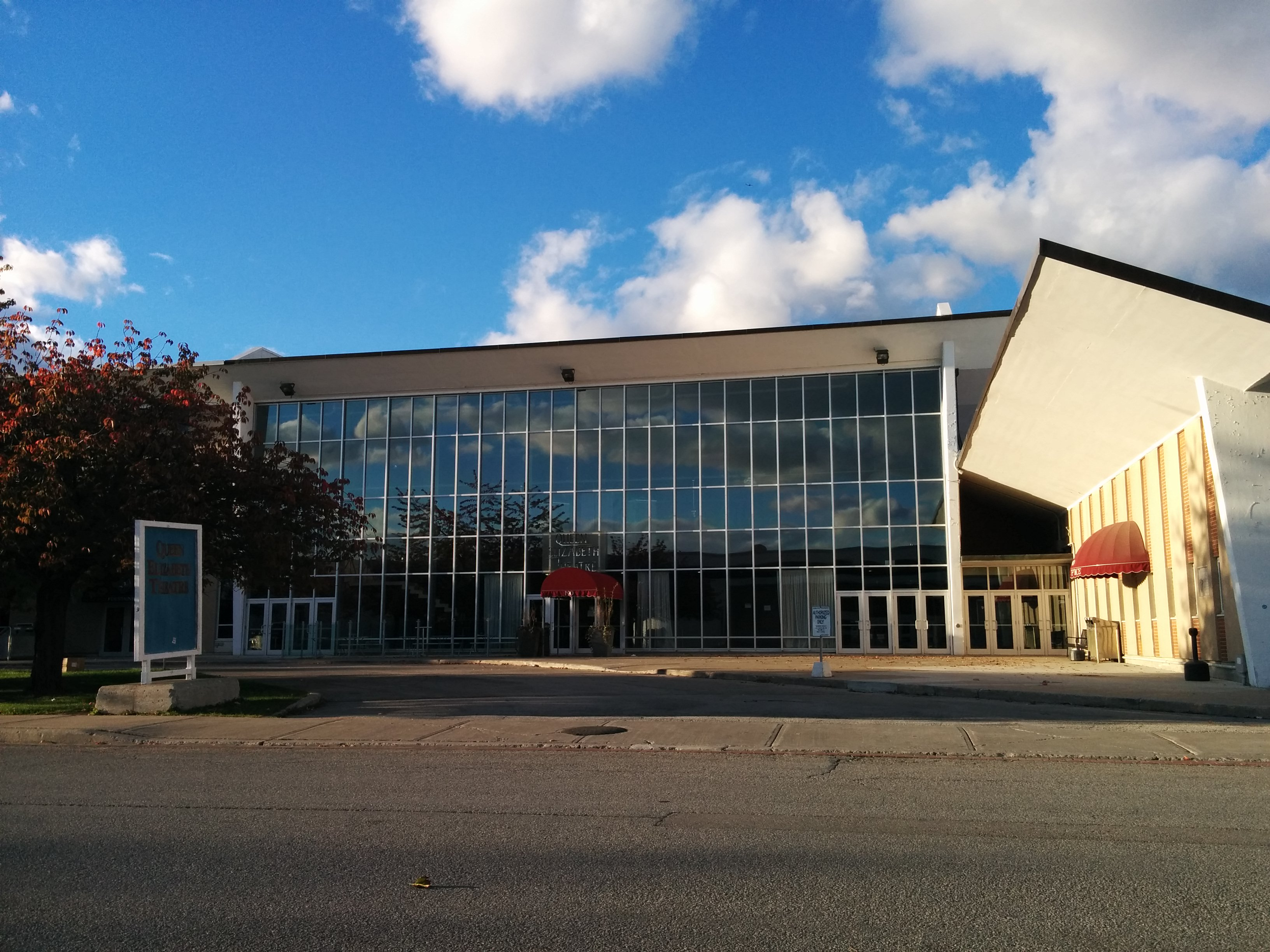
The Queen Elizabeth Building was erected in 1956, and dedicated to Elizabeth II, who became the Queen of Canada in the same year.

The Queen Elizabeth Building complex (1956) was originally named the Women's Building but was rededicated to the new Queen of Canada. The building is composed of three sections: the two-storey administration building, the Queen Elizabeth Theatre, and a one-storey exhibition hall. The structure is clad in brick and the roof is of a unique folded-plate cast-concrete design. It was designed by architect Peter Dickinson and architectural firm Page + Steele Inc. It was renamed in honour of a royal visit.

The offices were once occupied by the CNE Association and Board. The theatre, which has 1300 seats, has been used for radio, variety, and fashion shows and hosts stage productions and concerts. The exhibition hall, which is a large uninterrupted exhibit space is used year-round and is home to arts, crafts, and hobby vendor displays during the CNE.

==== The Scadding Cabin ====
This one-room cabin is located adjacent to the Fort Rouillé Monument and the CNE Bandshell. It is not only the oldest building on the grounds, but the oldest building in Toronto. It was built by the Queen's York Rangers in 1794 on behalf of John Scadding, who served as clerk (essentially, an executive assistant) to the first lieutenant governor of Upper Canada, John Graves Simcoe. The original cabin was disassembled from its original site and rebuilt by the York Pioneers, along with an adjacent cabin made out of new logs, on the current site, just in time for the original Toronto Industrial Exhibition in 1879.

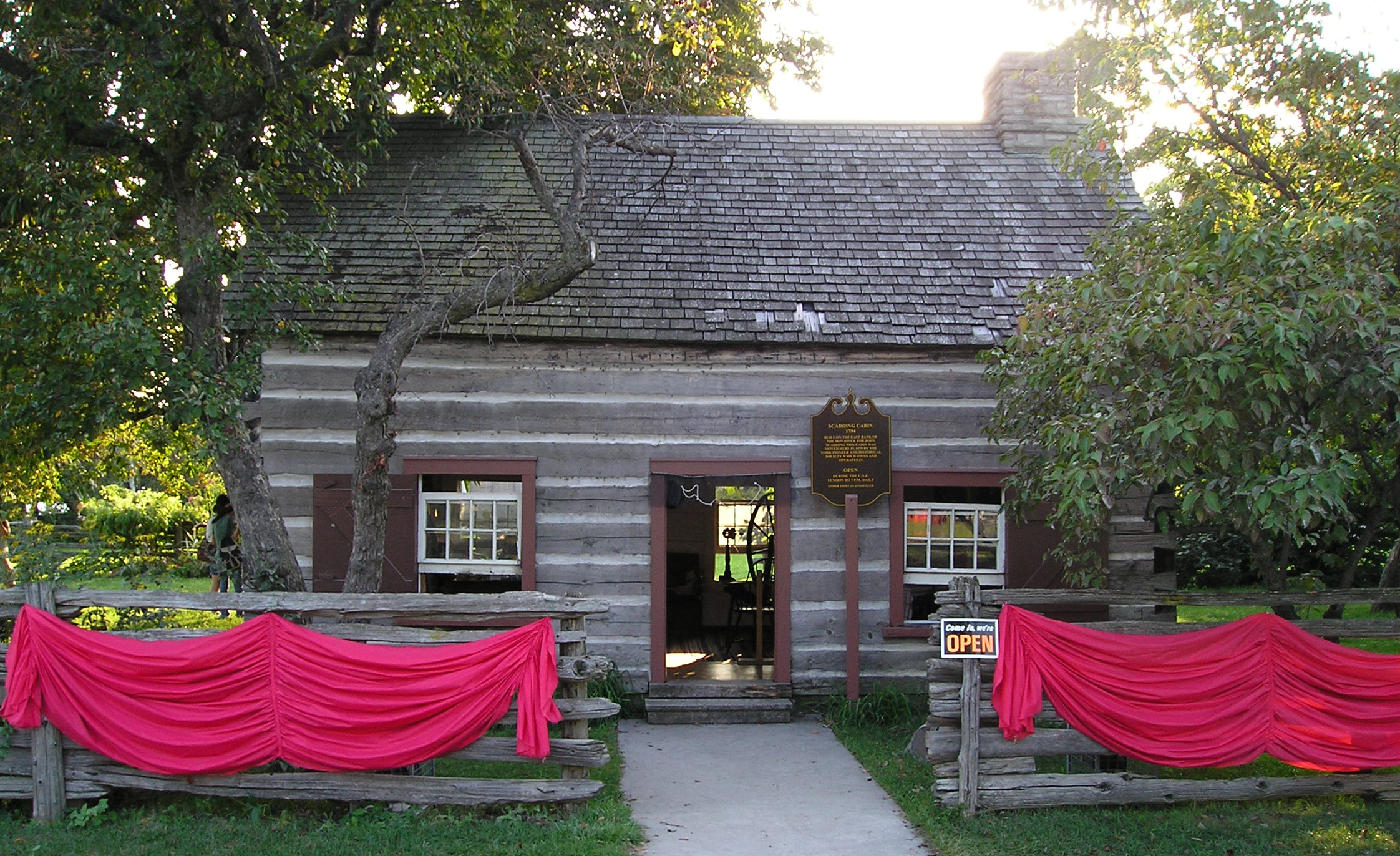
Scadding Cabin is Toronto's oldest standing structure. Erected in 1794, it was moved to its present site in 1879.

Scadding was given a plot of land from what is now just north of Gerrard Street East, south to the waterfront. The cabin was built close to the Don River's east side, on what is now part of the Don Valley Parkway, just south of Queen Street East. Scadding sold the property in 1818 to William Smith. In 1879, his son William Smith offered the cabin to the York Pioneers, a local historical society. Around this time, someone mistook the information concerning the original owner for the cabin, leading to it being erroneously called "The Governor Simcoe cabin". John Scadding's youngest son, Henry Scadding wrote an early history of York/Toronto and set the record straight on who the original owner of the cabin was. When he died in 1901, the York Pioneers renamed it "The Scadding Cabin", in honour of this son of the original owner, who had also been a past president of their society.

It is a squat, two-storey log cabin with low ceilings, designed to retain the heat from the fire in winter close to its occupants. It is said that John Graves Simcoe, who was over 6 ft (1.8 m) tall, had to stoop in order to enter the building. The building as it now stands is little changed from its original construction. Apparently an additional 7 ft (2.1 m) extension that would have appeared to the south of the building was not moved. The second cabin constructed next to it by the York Pioneers was built using wood that was too green, and it was demolished a few years after construction. Over the years some of the timbers have been replaced, and the cabin was remounted on a stone foundation in the late part of the 20th century. Inside the cabin are furnishings appropriate to a house in Upper Canada in the 1830s, and some known to have belonged to Simcoe.

=== Music and entertainment venues ===
==== Bandshell ====
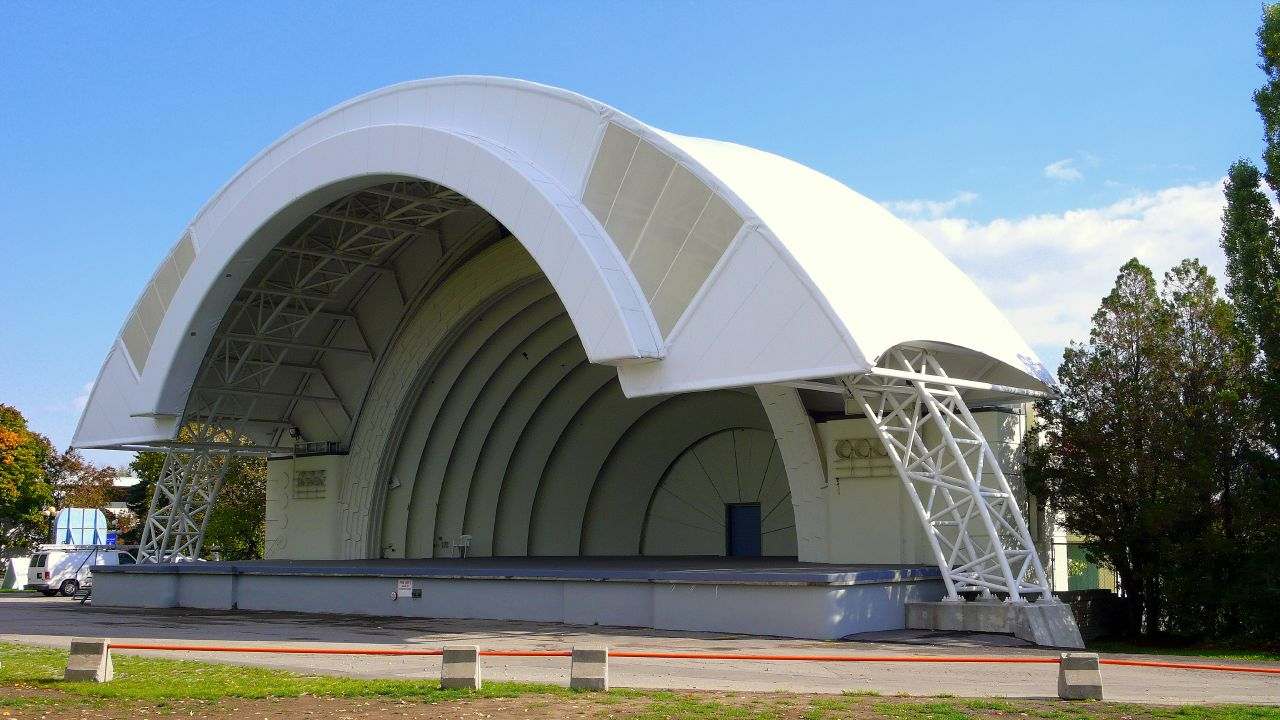
The CNE Bandshell with a modern canopy extension in 2007. The Art Deco shell was erected in 1936.

Inspired by the Hollywood Bowl, the Art Deco-styled Bandshell on the CNE grounds was built in 1936 according to designs prepared by the Toronto architectural firm of Craig and Madill. It is situated on the west side of the grounds, and over the years has been host to many famous acts, including Guy Lombardo, Louis Armstrong, The Guess Who, and Joni Mitchell. More recently the likes of Susan Aglukark, Moxy Früvous, and Bob Newhart have played the open air venue. The adjacent park is known as Bandshell Park. In the north-east corner is the Exhibition Place Carillon. To the south-east of the bandshell is the "Garden of the Greek Gods" collection of sculptures.

==== Queen Elizabeth Theatre ====
The Queen Elizabeth Theatre, opened in 1956, is a 1,250-seat auditorium, and is a part of the Queen Elizabeth building complex. It is leased to the operator of the Mod Club in Toronto and it is used for concerts and shows throughout the year.

=== Gates and monuments ===
==== Dufferin Gates ====
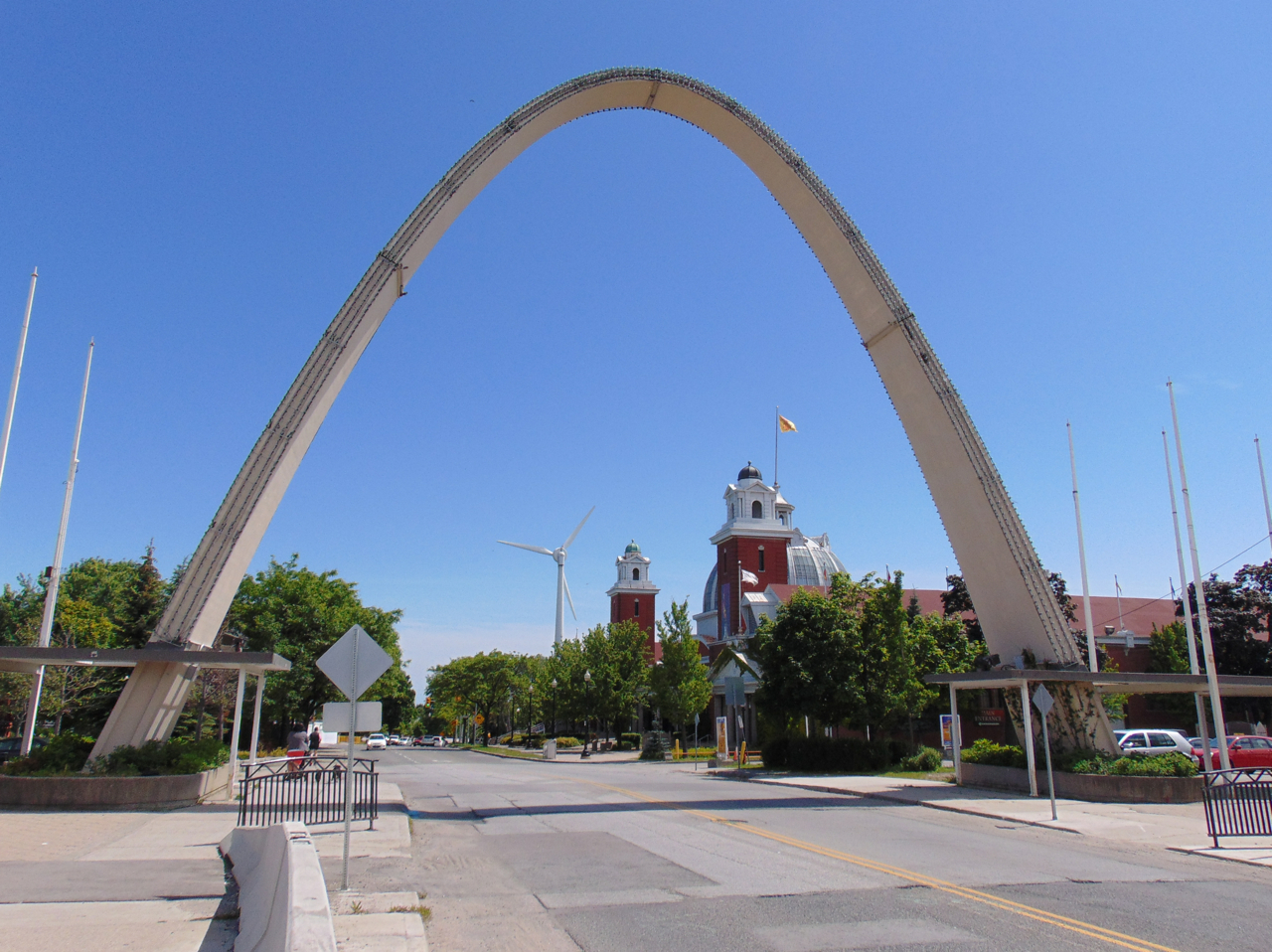
The Dufferin Gates ceremonial entrance to Exhibition Place.

The Dufferin Gates is the westernmost ceremonial entranceway to the CNE grounds. Named after Lord Dufferin, the original set of gates to the CNE grounds was named in his honour, situated at the bottom of Dufferin Street, also named after the same person. The original gateway was erected in 1895 and was superseded by a more permanent, ornate Beaux-Arts style triumphal arch built in 1910, and officially re-opened by Lord Dufferin in 1914.

With the construction of Toronto's Gardiner Expressway in 1956, the 1910 gates were demolished in order to make way for the roadway. In their place, a modernist-style parabolic arch was erected 50 ft (15 m) south of the previous gates in 1956, designed by architect Philip R. Brook. The current arch is built around a steel frame and concrete, with brick at the base. It is 65 ft (20 m) high and spans 74 ft (23 m) in width. It is similar in design to the much larger Gateway Arch in St. Louis, Missouri, but predates it. The star decoration that hangs from the top of the arch was added during Canada's centennial celebrations in 1967. The Gate is a listed heritage structure. A plaque from the Ontario Heritage Foundation commemorating the history of the CNE can be found just inside the gate.

==== Princes' Gates ====
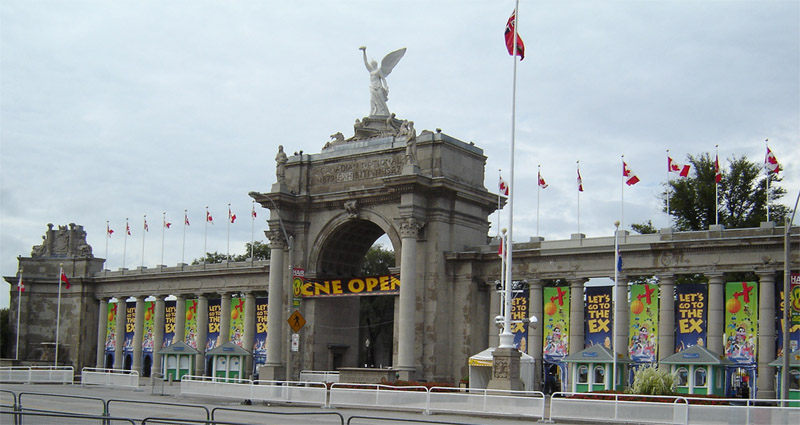
Princes' Gates serves as Exhibition Place's eastern ceremonial entrance.

The monumental Princes' Gates were officially opened by Princes Edward, Prince of Wales (later King Edward VIII), and Prince George (later the Duke of Kent), on August 31, 1927, during that year's CNE. The gates were built in the Beaux-Arts style to celebrate the 60th anniversary of Canadian Confederation and were originally to be called The Diamond Jubilee of Confederation Gates. The name was changed when it was found that the princes were touring Canada the year of its dedication. The first to pass through the gate was a parade of 15,000 veterans in the annual Warriors' Day Parade.

===== Fort Rouillé Monument =====
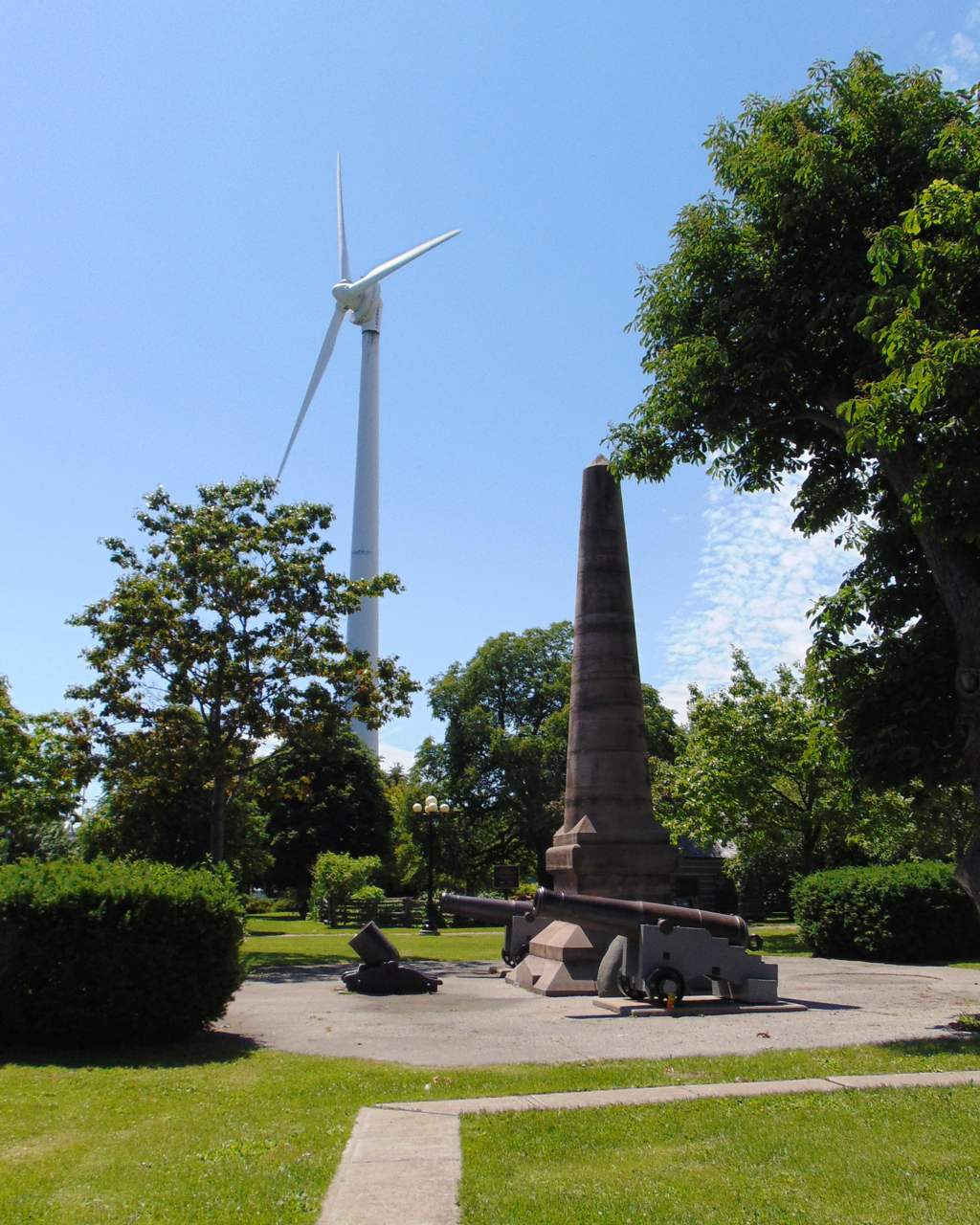
A monument marks the spot where Fort Rouillé once stood.

A large obelisk, built in 1887, marks the spot where the original French-built Fort Rouillé was erected in 1750 and 1751. Its construction was ordered by the Marquis de la Jonquière, then governor of New France, in order to further establish a French presence in the area, and to intercept the trade of Indians travelling towards an English fur-trading post in present-day Oswego. It was a small palisaded fort with a bastion at each of its four corners, and containing five main buildings: a corps de garde, storeroom, barracks, blacksmithy, and a building for the officers. A drawing purported to date from 1749 shows the fort adjacent to Lake Ontario, whereas today it is situated on top of a small hill a hundred metres or so from the lake's current shoreline.

The fort was abandoned and burned by the French garrison in July 1759, who were retreating from invading English forces. Vestiges of the fort remained for many years afterwards, and it was the site of a firefight in the War of 1812. The site was graded over and sodded in preparation for the establishment of the Toronto Industrial Exhibition in 1879.

The grounds were excavated in 1979 and 1980 by the Toronto Historical Board, and again in 1982 by the Youth Committee of the Toronto Sesquicentennial Board. The outline of the original fort has been marked out in concrete around the obelisk. Two commemorative plaques — one in English, and one in French — are attached to the base of the obelisk, placed there by the Ontario Heritage Foundation. To the north, a third plaque commemorates the excavation done on the site, and to the west, a fourth plaque commemorates a visit to the site by Bertrand Delanoë, mayor of Paris, on September 6, 2003.

===== Shrine Peace Memorial =====
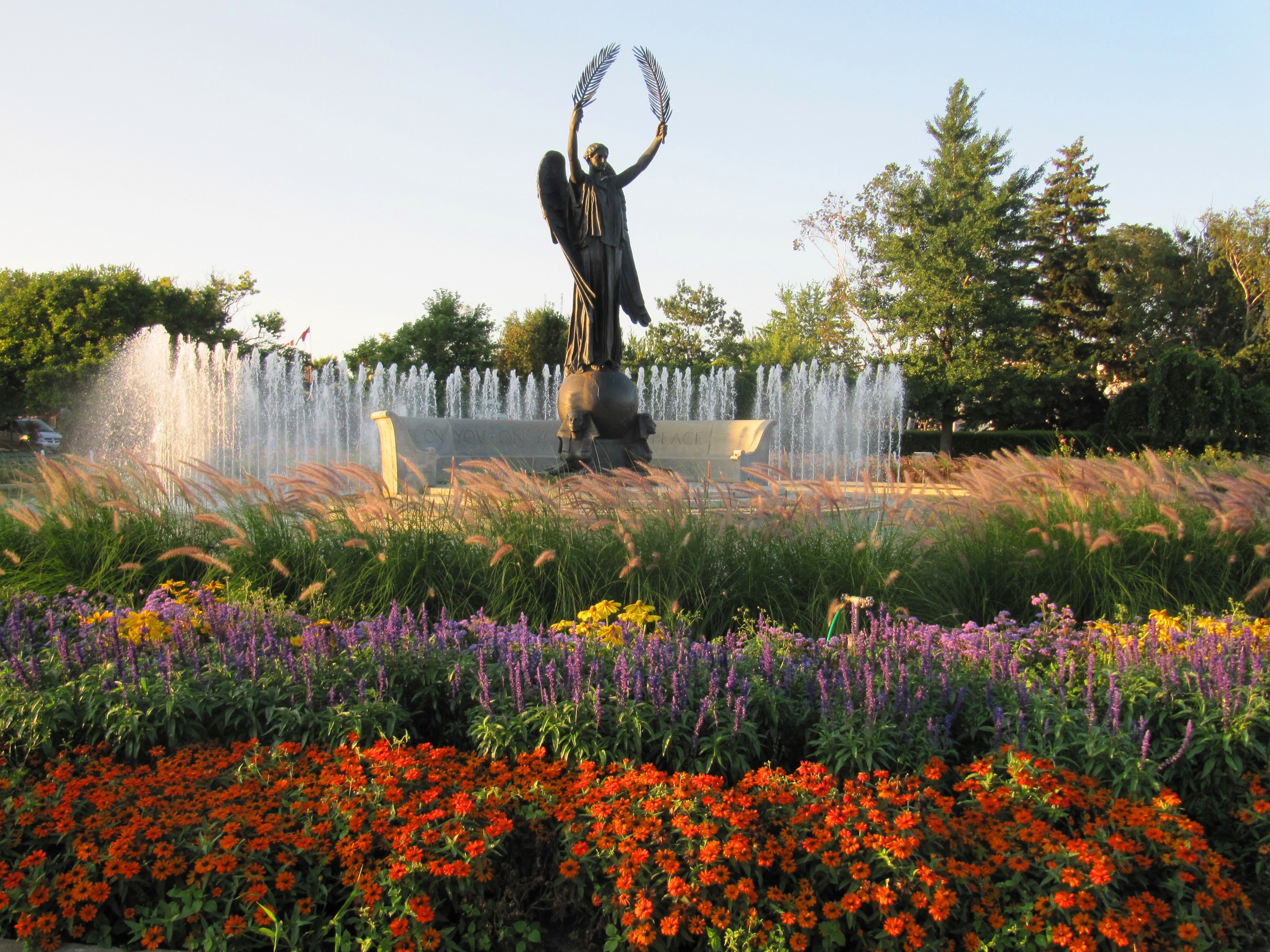
The Shrine Peace Memorial was erected in 1930 by the Shriners.

This monument, depicting a winged angel holding aloft a crown of olive branches and standing upon a globe held aloft by female sphinxes, was presented to the people of Canada on June 12, 1930, by the Ancient Arabic Order Nobles of the Mystic Shrine (better known as the Shriners) as a symbol of peace and friendship between the United States and Canada. It is also meant as "an ongoing reminder that Freemasonry actively promotes the ideals peace, harmony, and prosperity for all humankind". It is situated immediately south of the Bandshell, and is the focal point of the surrounding rose garden.

=== Other buildings and structures ===
- The Automotive Building (1929), was designed by local architect Douglas Kertland in the Art Deco style. It is a two-storey building, 160,000 square feet (15,000 m^{2}) in size. The internal plan is a large open space with a mezzanine on the second floor surrounding the main floor. It was originally constructed for the display of automobiles during the CNE. Management of the building was turned over to private management in 2009 and renovated to house the Allstream, now the Beanfield Centre meetings facility. The open floor was converted to a 43,900 square feet (4,080 m^{2}) ballroom, claimed to be largest in Toronto, which can be sub-divided in two. The original glass roof over the open floor was replaced with a new ceiling. The second floor mezzanine saw the addition of 20 meeting rooms.
- The Fire Hall & Police Station (1912) is a Tudor Revival building, designed by G. W. Gouinlock. It is used by Toronto Police Service, Toronto Fire Services and Toronto EMS during the CNE.
- The CNE General Services Building was built in 1901 as the Strachan Avenue Power Station and turned over to Ontario Hydro in 1910. It has been enlarged several times. Since 1959 it is a CNE Building and is now used to house the CNE Archives and various trades as well as a power substation.

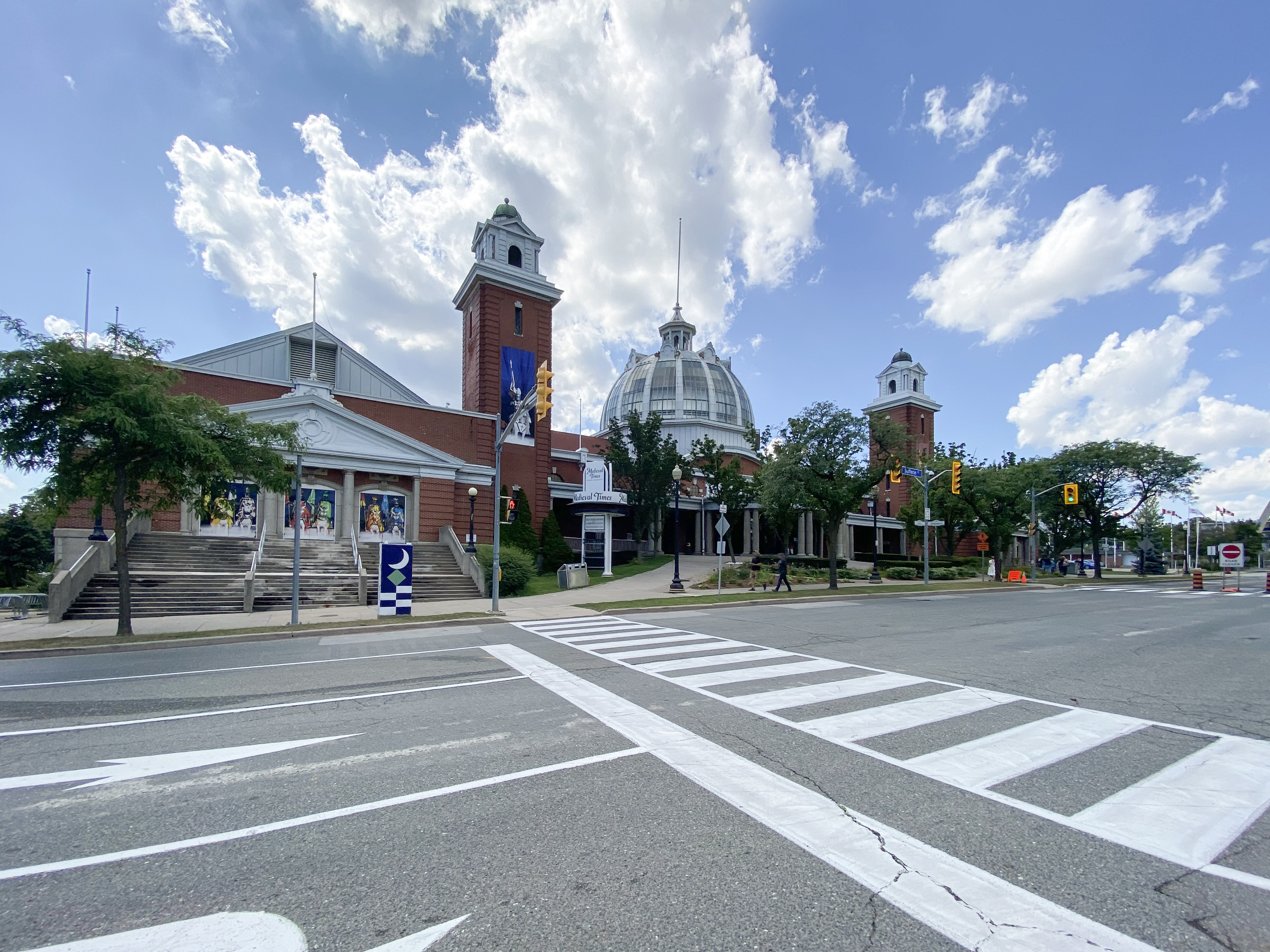
The Government Building was built in 1911 and has housed a Medieval Times dinner theatre since 1993.

- The Government Building was also known as the Arts, Crafts and Hobbies Building. It is a Beaux-Arts structure that was built in 1911. Designed by G. W. Gouinlock, it is similar in style to the Horticulture Building. Since 1993, the building has been used by Medieval Times as the Toronto location of its chain of dinner theatres.
- The Horse Palace (1931) was built to provide stables for the Royal Agricultural Winter Fair. The Art Deco building, designed by City architect James John Woolnough, was considered the best equestrian facility in Canada when it was built. Its façade has been described as one of the finest Art Deco buildings in the City of Toronto and possibly in the province and/or nation. The Art Deco elements of the Horse Palace include a hard-edged angular composition, cubist forms and strong horizontal and vertical planes. The low-relief sculptured friezes of horses located on the exterior of the building are also indicative of the Art Deco style of design. It is also the permanent home of the Toronto Police Service Mounted Unit, a branch of City of Toronto Animal Services and a riding academy.
- The Horticulture Building, designed by G. W. Gouinlock, was built in 1907 to replace the Crystal Palace. It is similar in style (Beaux-Arts) to the Government Building, but without the towers at the sides. The building was used as a temporary morgue the day after a fire destroyed the SS Noronic in 1949. It houses the Toronto Event Centre.
- The Music Building (1907) was constructed as the Railways Building, designed for the Grand Trunk and Canadian Pacific Railways by CNE architect G. W. Gouinlock. In 1968, the building was used for music competitions and soon became known as the Music Building. It was nearly destroyed by a fire in 1987 however the exterior was restored to its original condition. It is built in a Beaux-Arts style. It houses the Toronto Fashion Incubator.

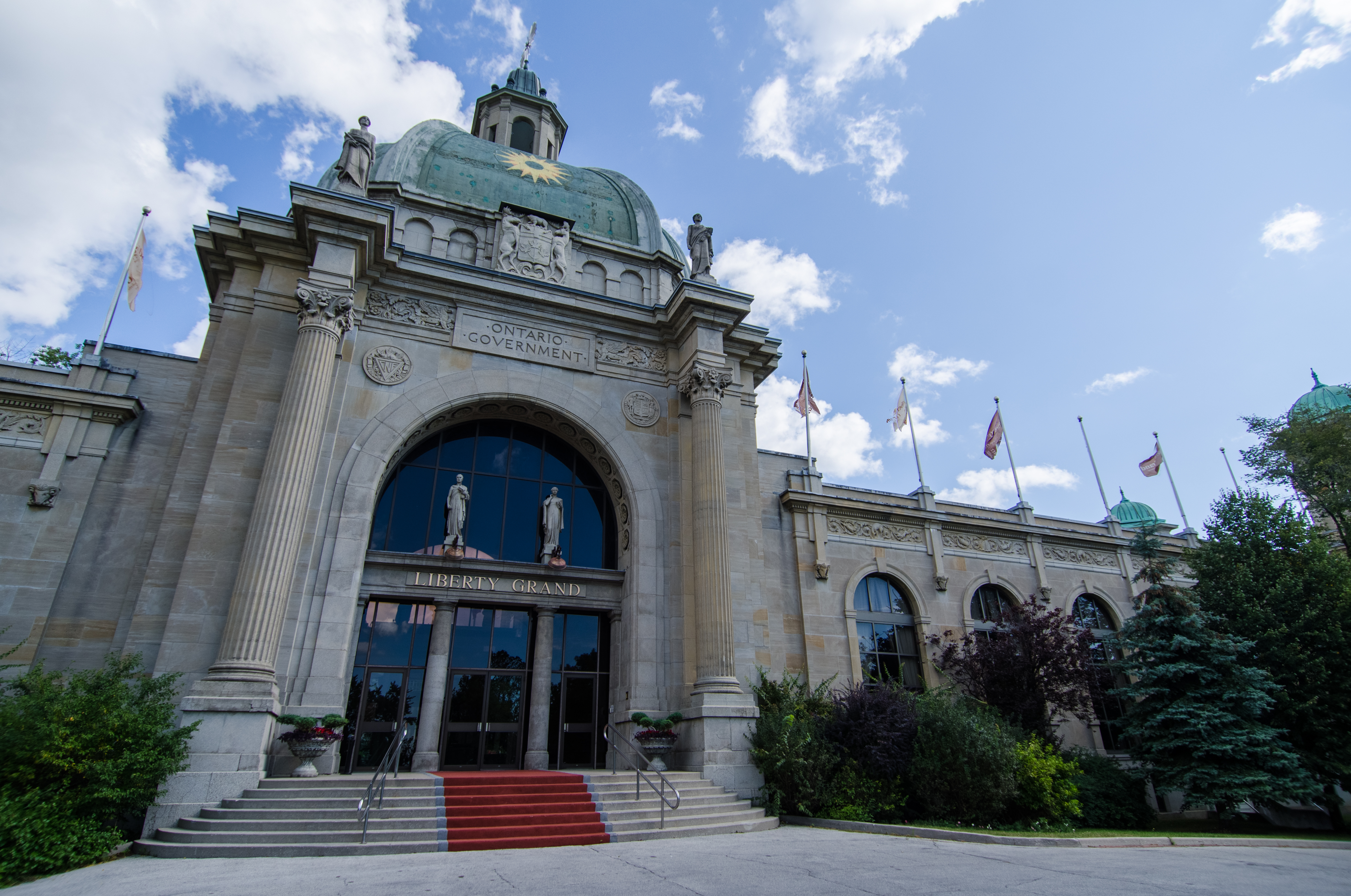
The Ontario Government Building was built in 1926 and is used as a banquet hall and event space.

- The Ontario Government Building (1926) houses the Liberty Grand banquet hall and events building. The Beaux-Art structure was designed by Chapman and Oxley. It formerly housed exhibits about Ontario.
- The Press Building, originally named the Administrative Building at its inception in 1905, until 1957 it was home to the CNE Association. In 1957 it was renamed the Press Building and it became the headquarters for the various media that would attend and report upon the annual fair. Additional telephone and press wire equipment was installed to handle the demand placed on it by the media. More recently the building has returned to its original function as home to the administrators of the CNE. This building was designed in the Beaux-Arts style by architect G.W. Gouinlock, who went on to design several buildings on the grounds. A plaque dedicated to his work stands in front of the Press Building. It was once part of a formal plaza that originally boasted the Gooderham Fountain, also designed by Gouinlock, since replaced by the Princess Margaret Fountain in 1958. The Press Building, along with the nearby Fire Hall, Police Station, Railways (Music) Building, Horticulture, and Government buildings, are collectively designated Early Exhibition Buildings National Historic Site. Tours of the building are available.
- The Officers' Quarters was a part of New Fort York and is the only remaining military building on the site. It is located along Lake Shore Boulevard to the west of the Automotive Building. Closed, it is planned to reopen with a pub and beer garden. It housed the Marine Museum from 1957 until 1998.

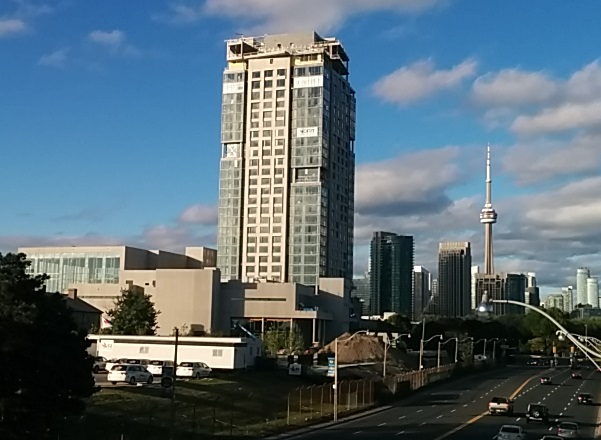
Hotel X Toronto under construction in 2017.

- Hotel X Toronto is a thirty-story hotel, located along Lake Shore Boulevard just west of the Automotive Building. The area was used as a parking lot for use during the CNE. It is divided into two buildings: the main hotel tower and a sports club building. Hotel X Toronto is a Silver "Leadership in Energy and Environmental Design" (LEED) certified project.

==== Structures ====
- CNE Flagpole, erected in 1977, to replace the original flagpole installed in 1930. Atop the CNE Flagpole is a copper ball with a time capsule with materials from the 1930 and 1977 installations. The copper ball was manufactured by James Gow and Company of Toronto and is the same one that sat atop the 1930 flagpole.
- McGillivray Fountain 1968, stands in Centennial Park, in the north-western end of the grounds, a modern-art concrete sculpture creation dedicated to a former president of the Exhibition. Designed by sculptor Gerald Gladstone.
- Princess Margaret Fountain (1958) designed by Design Craft, was opened by Princess Margaret on July 31, 1958.
- Sky Ride, a cable car ride introduced at the 2012 CNE in the spirit of the Alpine Way.
- ExPlace Wind Turbine, a 91-metre windmill belonging to WindShare co-operative, erected on December 18, 2002, is the first wind turbine installed in a major North American urban city centre. The turbine production capacity helps displace up to 380 tonnes of carbon dioxide annually, which is the equivalent of taking 1,300 cars off the road or planting 30,000 trees each year.

=== Demolished buildings and attractions ===
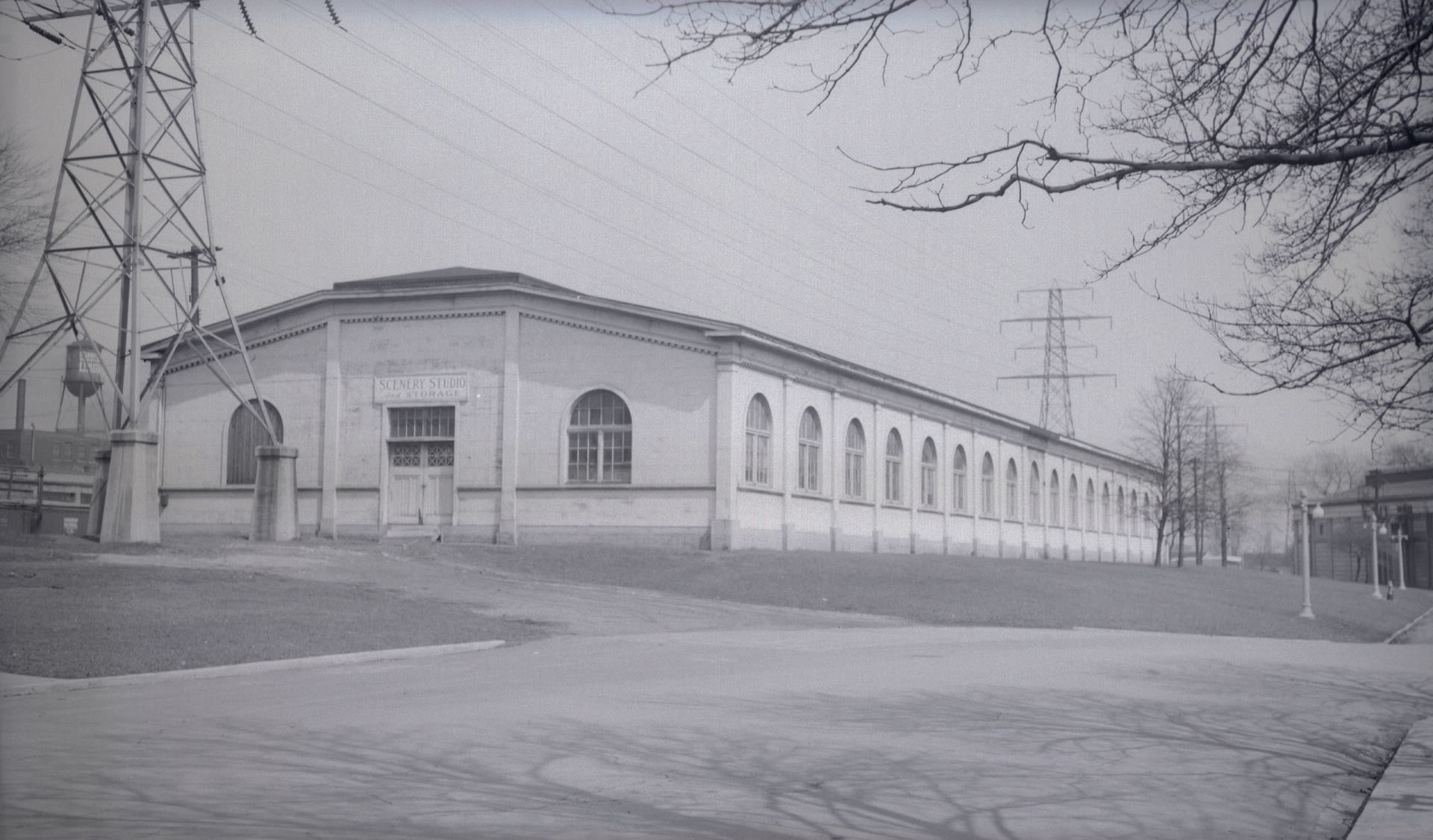
View of the Machinery Hall in 1952. The building was demolished in 1960 to make way for the Gardiner Expressway.

- Business Equipment Building, built in 1900.
- Canada's Sports Hall of Fame, built 1961 as the joint home of Canada's Sports Hall of Fame and the Hockey Hall of Fame. The latter moved in 1993, and the Sports Hall was partially demolished in 2006, with remaining sections to be incorporated into BMO Field, a new soccer stadium. The building was designed by the architectural firm of Allward and Gouinlock, the successor firm to the firm of G. W. Gouinlock, which designed several of the older buildings.
- The Crystal Palace (later known as Transportation Building) was a large exhibit building on the site of the current Horticulture Building, dating to the 1850s. It was moved to the Exhibition Grounds and used for various displays. It was destroyed by fire in 1906.
- The Electrical and Engineering Building was built in 1928. The building was demolished in 1972 and the site is now occupied by the Enercare Centre.
- The General Exhibits Building, built in 1906, was demolished in 1962. The site is now occupied by the Children's Midway.
- The Graphic Arts Building was located on the site of the current Queen Elizabeth office building.
- The Machinery Hall, located on the north side of the grounds, was one of the buildings demolished around 1960 for the Gardiner Expressway.
- The Manufacturers' Building was a building used to house exhibits of household appliances, fixtures, and furnishings. Built in 1902, it burned down on January 3, 1961, and was replaced by the Better Living Centre.
- The Process of Manufacturing Building was built in 1905 was located behind the current Press Building and General Exhibits Building and demolished in the early 1960s. Now a parking area.
- Pure Food Building (later known as Food Products Building) - built in 1921 and replaced by current building in 1954
- Stanley Barracks - 14 of 15 buildings were demolished in the early 1950s to make space for parking.
- Transportation Building (later known as International Building) burned down on August 24, 1974. It was on the west side of Bandshell Park.

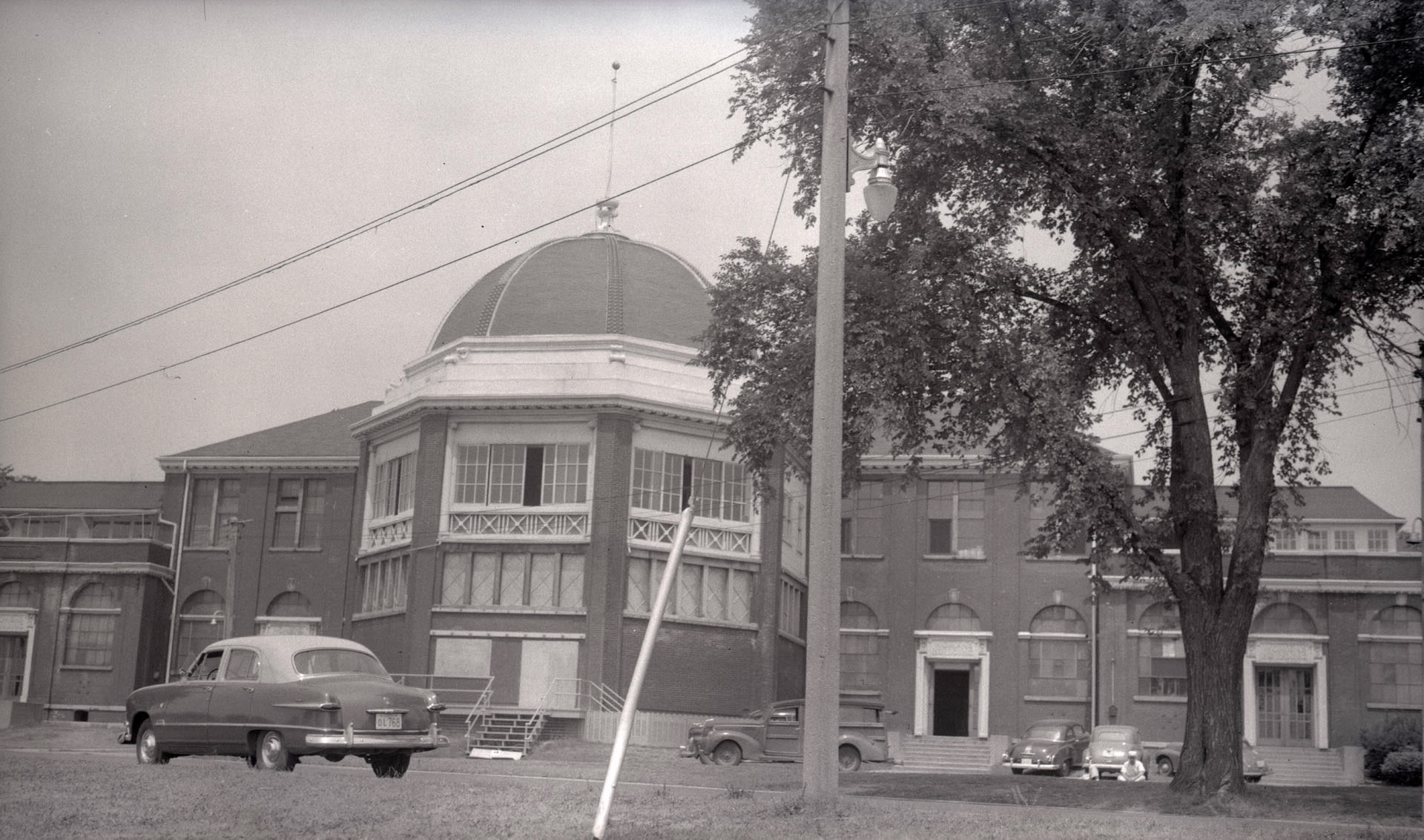
The Women's Building in 1952. The Women's Building was destroyed in a fire nine years later in 1961.

- The Women's Building was built in 1908 as an addition to the Manufacturers' Building and burned along with it in 1961. It had been converted to a restaurant in 1959.

Attractions

- Alpine Way - An aerial lift that allowed visitors to view the Ex from west of the Food Building to west of the Automotive Building. The system consisted of four rows of cars (blue, green and red) carrying four passengers. The system was taken down in 1996 and placed into storage in 1998. This was the last of the permanent attractions built by Conklin Shows, and Jim Conklin described the dismantling of the attraction as a "heartbreak". Sam Sniderman shared equal sadness in the removal of the attraction, so much that he bought the ride sign and donated it to the CNE archives.
- original Dufferin Gate - replaced by the current gate in 1959; previous gates built in 1895 and again in 1910.
- Gooderham Fountain - built in 1910 and replaced by the Princess Margaret Fountain in 1958.
- Mighty Flyer- a wooden roller coaster, built in 1953 by Conklin Shows. It was a permanent fixture that lasted until 1992.
- Shell Oil Tower (later known as the Bulova Tower) = Built in 1955, it was demolished in 1985. The Shell Oil Tower was designed by 24-year-old George A. Robb, who had won a competition by Shell to design the tower. It was a see-through structure of glass and steel with an observation platform at 90 feet (27 m) above the ground. The tower was demolished to make way for the Indy race, which paid the cost of demolition. It had been closed the previous two years due to safety concerns.

== Race course ==
Exhibition Place hosted American open-wheel car racing, sanctioned by IndyCar and formerly ran as the Ontario Honda Dealers Indy Toronto. The race was held annually in July from 1986 to 2025. In addition to the IndyCar race, several support races were also held, including Indy NXT and the NASCAR Canada Series, as well as vendor exhibits, concerts, and other off-track activities. The street circuit used local roads that wound through and around Exhibition Place and was commonly referred to as the "Streets of Toronto". The race festival took place on a weekend, with the roads closed from Thursday until Monday.

== Transportation ==
=== Public transit ===
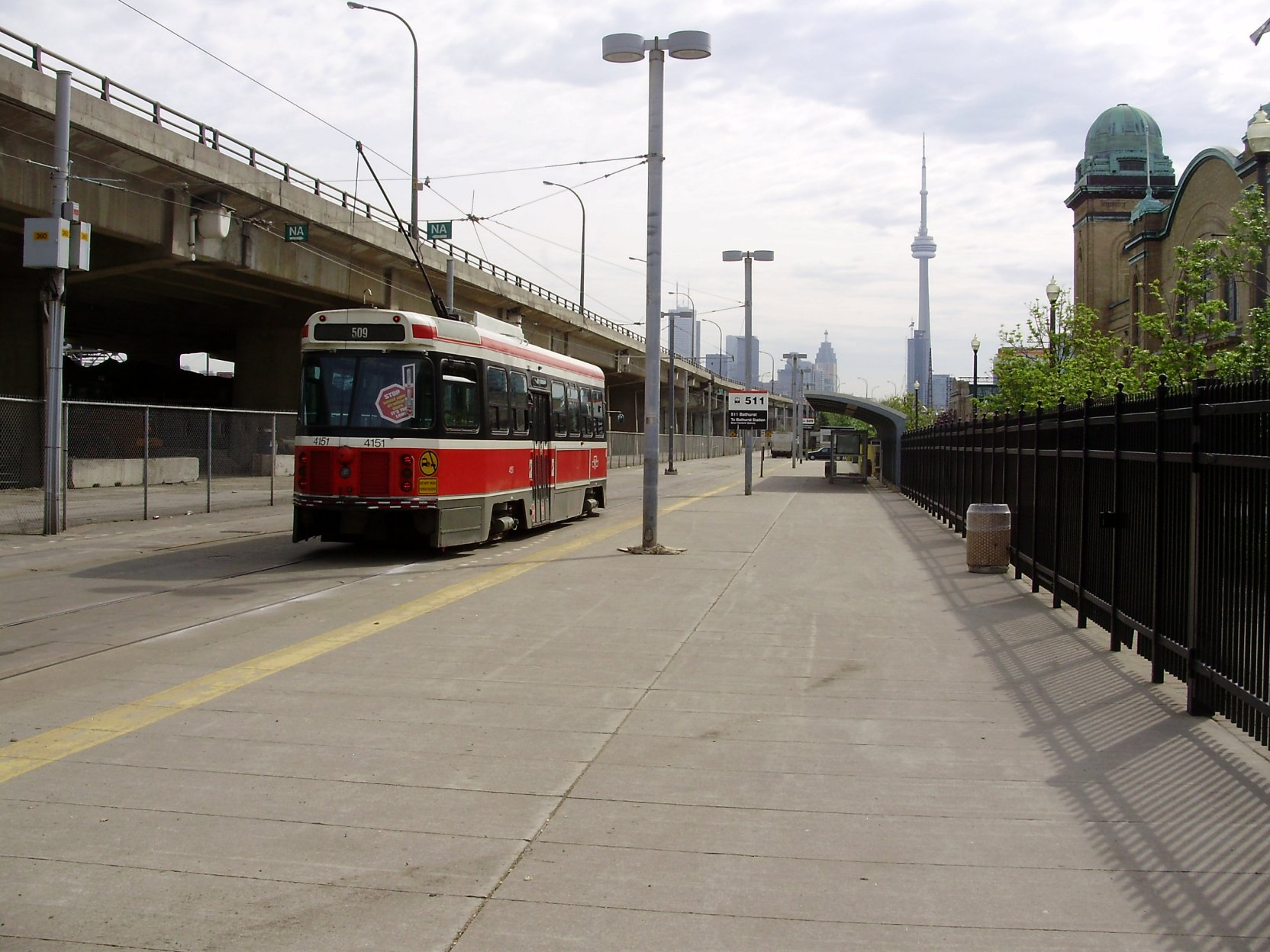
Exhibition Loop serves as a terminus for several streetcar routes.

Exhibition Place is served by city and regional public transit systems by commuter rail, streetcar and bus routes provided by GO Transit and the TTC year-round. There are two access points: north of the Horse Palace (Exhibition Loop and Exhibition GO Station), and north of the Dufferin Gate at the Dufferin Gate Loop.

The TTC serves Exhibition Place with three streetcar routes and one bus route. The 509 Harbourfront and 511 Bathurst streetcar lines serve the Exhibition Loop terminus, connecting Exhibition Place with Toronto subway system's Bathurst and Union stations. Exhibition Place is also served by the 504B King streetcar, sharing the Dufferin Gate Loop with the Dufferin bus (routes 29 and 929). The Dufferin bus route loops through Exhibition Place most of the year and terminates at the Dufferin Gate Loop terminus during the CNE. The Dufferin routes 29 and 929 connect with the subway's Dufferin station on Line 2 Bloor–Danforth.

The Exhibition GO Station is on the Lakeshore route of the commuter rail GO Transit system, providing a connection to Union Station and points east and west. The route stops year-round at the station. The station is being upgraded to also include the terminus of the Ontario Line subway, which will connect Exhibition Place with downtown and the Toronto subway system. It is expected to open in 2031.

The first streetcar terminus began operations in 1916 and was located at the current loop location along Manitoba Drive, north of the Coliseum. In 1923, the loop was relocated to the south of the Coliseum. To accommodate the construction of the National Trade Centre, it was relocated back to its original location in 1996. The GO station is the second rail station to serve the fair. Its original location was just north of the Dufferin Gate, and only operated during the CNE.

=== Roads and gates ===
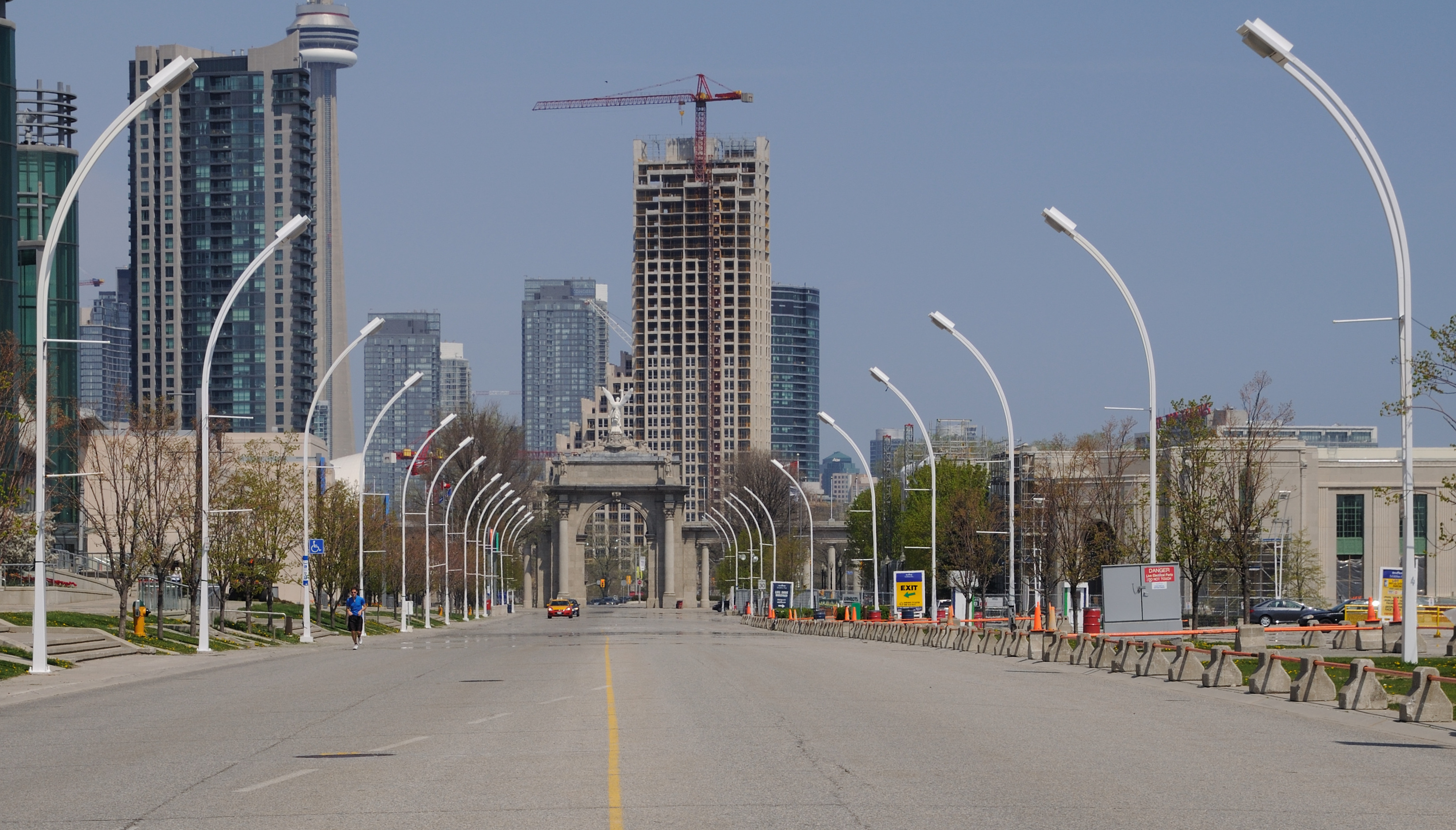
View of Princes' Boulevard looking eastward towards Princes' Gates.

Princes' Boulevard starts at the Princes' Gate and extends west to the south of BMO Field and continues west to the Princess Margaret Fountain. Canada Boulevard runs north–south to the west of the Princes' Gate. In 1973, the rest of the roads on the grounds were named for most of the provinces and territories of Canada.

- Alberta Circle - short street connecting British Columbia Drive with Yukon Place and a short stub at Dufferin Street next to Medieval Times
- British Columbia Road - road begins at the foot of Dufferin Street and ends at Western entrance/exit merging with westbound Lake Shore Boulevard West
- Manitoba Drive - long east–west street along the north end of the Exhibition grounds from Strachan Avenue to Princes' Boulevard. Easterly section was once called Exhibition Road.
- Newfoundland Road - short north–south road on the west side of Automotive Building connecting Princes' Boulevard to Lake Shore Boulevard West
- New Brunswick Way - connects Nunavut Road to Remembrance Drive at Ontario Place
- Nova Scotia Avenue - short road from Manitoba Drive to Princes' Boulevard
- Nunavut Road - newest street (formerly part of New Brunswick Way) begins and ends at Nova Scotia Avenue
- Ontario Drive - short street connecting Princes Boulevard with Prince Edward Island Crescent
- Prince Edward Island Crescent - semi circular street behind Better Living Centre and connects with Ontario Drive and Princes Boulevard
- Quebec Street - short stub behind Queen Elizabeth Building connecting to Manitoba Drive; eastern end to Nova Scotia Avenue cut off by BMO Field
- Saskatchewan Road - connects British Columbia Rd to the intersection of Prince Edward Island Crescent and Princes' Boulevard
- Yukon Place - short road behind Liberty Grand and Medieval Times

Northwest Territories is not used as a street name at Exhibition Place.

Other gates in the park outside of Princes' and Dufferin Gates lack formal structure and are merely entrances with traffic lights:

- British Columbia Gate - formerly Confederation Gate
- Ontario Gate
- Newfoundland Gate
- Manitoba Gate

Former roads:

Exhibition Road was a short east–west road that ran from Strachan Avenue north of the Coliseum buildings to connect the exhibition site to Strachan, which at the time ran no further south. Fort Rouillé Street, of which a stub still exists north of the rail tracks, once extended into the Exhibition grounds to the lake shore. The street was cut off by the construction of the rail cut to move the rail lines below grade. The stub still existing within the grounds was later named Alberta Circle.

== See also ==
- History of the Canadian National Exhibition
- Royal eponyms in Canada—locales in Canada named for royalty akin to the Princes' Gates, Princess Margaret Fountain, Queen Elizabeth II Building, and Queen Elizabeth II Theatre at Exhibition Place
- Toronto waterfront
- Venues of the 2015 Pan American and Parapan American Games
