= Sutton (surname) =

Family name

Sutton, originally de Sutton, is an English toponymic surname. One origin is from Anglo-Saxon where it is derived from sudh, suth, or suð, and tun referring to the generic placename "southern farm". Note that almost every county in England contains one or more placenames bearing the prefix "Sutton". The Domesday Book (1086) contains the first recorded spelling of the surname as "Ketel de Sudtone"; "Suttuna" also appeared in 1086 in records from Ely, Cambridgeshire. In 1379 tax records, the surname appears as "de Sutton" ("of Southtown"). One source refers to the origin as being Anglo-Norman, with the name itself derived as described above, from Anglo-Saxon terms.

Related surnames include early variants "de Sudtone" (1086), "Suttuna" (1086), "de Sutton" (1379), and "de Sutun". Additional variants include "Suton" and "Suttone".

The Sutton are ancestors to the Dudley.

This surname is shared by the following notable people:

== Born in the 13th century ==
- Drew de Sutton (fl. 13th century), lord of the Manor of Thorncote, England
- Geoffrey de Sutton (fl. 13th century), lord of the Manor of Tockholes, England
- John de Sutton (fl. 1306), MP for Essex
- Thomas of Sutton (or Thomas de Sutton) (fl. 1274–aft 1315), Dominican friar and theologian

== Born in the 14th century ==
- Allan Sutton (fl. 14th century), Member of Parliament
- Hugh de Sutton (fl. 14th century), Prior of Christ Church Cathedral, Ireland
- John de Sutton II (1310–1359), 1st Baron Sutton of Dudley
- John de Sutton III (1339 – c. 1370), 2nd Baron Sutton of Dudley
- John de Sutton IV (1361–1396), 3rd Baron Sutton of Dudley
- John de Sutton V (1380–1406), 4th Baron Sutton of Dudley
- John Sutton of Lincoln (d. c. 1391), English politician
- Matrin de Sutton (fl. 15th century), first rector of Church of St George, Beckington

== Born in the 15th century ==
- John Sutton, 1st Baron Dudley (1400–1487)
- John Sutton (composer) (fl. 15th century), English composer
- Edward Sutton, 2nd Baron Dudley (c. 1460 – 1531)

== Born in the 16th century ==
- Thomas Sutton (1532–1611), British merchant and civil servant

== Born in the 17th century ==
- Richard Sutton (British Army officer) (1674–1737), Major-General and Member of Parliament. Brother of Robert Sutton
- Robert Sutton (diplomat) (1671–1746), British diplomat, clergyman and Member of Parliament

== Born in the 18th century ==
- Charles Sutton (1756–1846), British clergyman and botanist
- John Sutton (merchant) (1777–1863), founder of Suttons Seeds
- Samuel Sutton (1760–1832), Royal Navy admiral
- Samuel Sutton (American politician) (died 1878), American politician of Maryland

== Born in the 19th century ==
- Bertine Sutton (1886–1946), British air marshal
- Charles Sutton (1891–1962), English cricketer and British Army officer
- Edith Sutton (1862–1957), first woman councillor in England, Mayor of Reading and suffragist
- George Lowe Sutton (1872–1964), Australian agricultural scientist
- George Miksch Sutton (1898–1982), American ornithologist and bird artist
- John Edward Sutton (1862–1945), British politician
- Joseph William Sutton (1844–1914), British emigrant to Australia, shipbuilder, inventor, X-ray pioneer
- Richard Charles Sutton (1834–1915), English architect
- Thomas Sutton (photographer) (1819–1875), English photographer, author, and inventor
- Walter Sutton (1877–1916), American biologist

== Born in the 20th century ==
- Adrian Sutton (born 1967), British theatre composer
- Andy Sutton (born 1975), Canadian ice hockey player
- Antony C. Sutton (1925–2002), historian and author
- Beth Sutton, American general surgeon
- Brett Sutton (born c. 1960), Australian triathlon coach
- Brett Sutton (doctor) (born 1968/1969), Australian public health doctor
- Cameron Sutton (born 1995), American football player
- Carol Sutton (1944–2020), American actress
- Charles Sutton (cricketer, born 1906) (1906–1945), Anglo-Chilean cricketer
- Chloe Sutton (born 1992), American swimmer
- Chris Sutton (born 1973), English footballer
- Christopher Sutton-Mattocks (born 1951), British-Maltese coroner and cricketer
- Courtland Sutton (born 1995), American football player
- Crystal Lee Sutton (1940–2009), American union organizer and advocate, inspiration for the film Norma Rae
- Deirdre Sutton (fl. 1960s), Irish sportsperson
- Dominique Sutton (born 1986), American basketball player
- Don Sutton (1945–2021), baseball playerand sports broadcaster
- Dudley Sutton (1933–2018), English actor
- Eddie Sutton (1936–2020), basketball coach
- Eugene Sutton (born 1954), American bishop from Maryland
- Frank Sutton (1923–1974), actor
- Georgina Sutton (born 1961), Australian aviator
- Gerda Sutton (1923–2005), British-French painter
- Graham Sutton (1972), English musician, songwriter, composer and record producer
- Greg Sutton (basketball) (born 1967), American basketball player
- Greg Sutton (soccer) (born 1977), Canadian soccer player
- Hal Sutton (born 1958), American golfer
- Jason Sutton (born 1966), British Royal Air Force officer
- Jason Sutton (born 1968), English drag artist
- James Sutton (born 1983), English actor
- Muhammad James Sutton (born 1978), student of Yahya al-Hajuri.
- Jeff Sutton (real estate developer) (born 1960), American real estate developer from New York
- Jeffrey Sutton (born 1960), American judge
- Jim Sutton (born 1941), New Zealand politician
- Joe Sutton, American playwright
- John Sutton (actor) (1908–1963), British–Indian actor
- John F. Sutton Jr., American lawyer
- John Sutton (baseball) (born 1952), American sportsperson
- John Sutton (economist) (born 1948), British academic
- John Sutton (geologist) (1919–1992), British geologist
- John Sutton (hurler), Irish sportsperson
- John Sutton (RAF officer) (1932–2014), British military officer
- John Sutton (rugby league) (born 1984), Australian rugby player
- John Jay Sutton (1949–2011), aka Oliver Humperdink, American wrestling manager
- John R. Sutton (born 1949), American academic
- Johnny Sutton (born 1961), American lawyer
- Julie Sutton (mayor) (born 1937), Australian politician
- Kathy Sutton, married name of Kathy Cox (skydiver)
- Keith Sutton (bishop) (1934–2017), British bishop of Lichfield
- Laurie S. Sutton (born 1953), American comic and children's book writer
- Len Sutton (1925–2006), American racecar driver
- Loree K. Sutton, American general and politician
- Mark Sutton, (1971–2913), British stuntman
- Mel Sutton, English football player
- Melvin Sutton, American dancer
- Mike Sutton (basketball) (born 1956), American basketball player
- Mike Sutton (criminologist) (born 1959), English criminologist
- Mike Sutton (footballer) (1944–2020), English football player
- Oliver Graham Sutton (1903–1977), Welsh mathematician and meteorologist
- Paul Sutton (1910–1970), American actor
- Paul Alexander Sutton (born 1956), British businessman
- Richard S. Sutton, computer scientist
- Ritchie Sutton (born 1986), English football player
- Roger Sutton (born 1964/1965), New Zealand businessman
- Sarah Sutton (born 1961), English actress
- Shelton B. Sutton Jr. (1919–1942), American navy officer
- Steve Sutton (footballer) (born 1961), English football player
- Steve Sutton (skydiver), Canadian skydiver
- Tierney Sutton (born 1963), American jazz singer
- Tyrell Sutton (born 1986), American football player
- Valerie Sutton (born 1951), American dancer and developer of movement notation
- Ward Sutton, American political cartoonist
- Will Sutton (born 1991), American football player
- Willie Sutton (1901–1980), American bank robber and prison escape-artist

== Born in the 21st century ==
- Lucky Sutton (born 2004), American football player

== See also ==
- Sutton baronets
- Sutton (given name)
- Disambiguation pages
  - Alan Sutton
  - Albert Sutton (disambiguation)
  - Anthony Sutton (disambiguation)
  - Brian Sutton (disambiguation)
  - Charles Sutton (disambiguation)
  - Chris Sutton
  - Claire Sutton (disambiguation)
  - Clarence Sutton (disambiguation)
  - David Sutton (disambiguation)
  - Edward Sutton (disambiguation)
  - Elizabeth Sutton (disambiguation)
  - George Sutton (disambiguation)
  - Greg Sutton (disambiguation)
  - Henry Sutton (disambiguation)
  - John Sutton
  - Julia Sutton (disambiguation)
  - Keith Sutton
  - Kelly Sutton
  - Laura Sutton (disambiguation)
  - Matt Sutton (disambiguation)
  - Michael Sutton (disambiguation)
  - Mickey Sutton (disambiguation)
  - Nicholas Sutton
  - Oliver Sutton (disambiguation)
  - Peter Sutton (disambiguation)
  - Philip Sutton (disambiguation)
  - Rachel Sutton (disambiguation)
  - Richard Sutton (disambiguation)
  - Robert Sutton (disambiguation)
  - Steve Sutton (disambiguation)
  - Thomas Sutton
  - William Sutton (disambiguation)
