= Charles Sutton =

Charles Sutton may refer to:

- Charles Sutton (actor) (1856–1935), American film actor
- Charles Sutton (cricketer, born 1891) (1891–1962), English cricketer and British Army officer
- Charles Sutton (cricketer, born 1906) (1906–1945), English-Chilean cricketer and Royal Naval Volunteer Reserve officer
- Charles William Sutton (1848–1920), British librarian and author
- Charlie Sutton (1924–2012), Australian rules footballer
