= Sutton (given name) =

- Gender: unisex

Origin
- Origin: English
- Meaning: “From the southern homestead”

Sutton is a given name of English origin, a transferred use of a surname and place name meaning "from the southern homestead".

== Popularity ==
The name has recently increased in popularity in the United States, where it has been among the one thousand most popular names for girls since 2013 and among the top three hundred names since 2021. It has also been among the top one thousand names for boys in the United States since 2015.

== Notable people ==
=== Men ===
- Sutton E. Griggs (1872–1933), American author, Baptist minister, and social activist
- Sutton Marks (1928–2025), American businessman and politician from Mississippi
- Sutton Smith (born 1996), American football player
- Sutton Symes (1659–1751), Irish Anglican priest

=== Women ===
- Sutton Foster (born 1975), American actress, singer, and dancer
- Sutton Stracke (born 1971), American socialite, businesswoman, and television personality

== Fictional characters ==
- Sutton Mercer, from the Sara Sherpard series: The Lying Game
- Sutton Brady, from the Freeform series: The Bold Type

== See also ==
- Sutton (surname)
