= Jenrette =

Jenrette is a surname. Notable people with the surname include:

- John Jenrette (born 1936), former American politician from the Democratic Party
- Kelly Jenrette, American actress
- Richard Jenrette (born 1929), one of the founders of the Wall Street firm, Donaldson, Lufkin & Jenrette (DLJ)
- Rita Jenrette née Carpenter (born 1949), American celebrity, actor, television journalist, and real estate executive

== See also ==
- Donaldson, Lufkin & Jenrette, defunct U.S. investment bank founded by William H. Donaldson, Richard Jenrette and Dan Lufkin in 1959
- Jeannerot
- Juniorate
