= Chrystelle Trump Bond =

American dancer and historian (1938–2020)

- Born: Chrystelle Lee Trump; January 1, 1938; Manchester, Maryland, U.S.
- Died: May 6, 2020 (aged 82); Towson, Maryland, U.S.
- Education: University of North Carolina at Greensboro (BS and MFA)
- Known for: Dance; Choreography; Dance history
- Movement: Modern dance; Ballet; Folk dance

Chrystelle Lee Trump Bond (January 1, 1938 – May 6, 2020) was an American dancer, choreographer, dance historian, and author. Bond was the founding chair of the dance department at Goucher College. She was the co-founder and director of Chorégraphie Antique, the dance history ensemble at Goucher. Bond was a dance critic for The Baltimore Sun.

== Early life and education ==
Bond was born to Viva V. Fridinger and George Elwood Trump Sr., both of Manchester, Maryland. Her father was an auto mechanic who later became a businessman. She had one sibling, a brother, George Elwood Jr.

Bond graduated cum laude with a Bachelor of Science in dance from the Women's College of University of North Carolina at Greensboro in 1960. She taught at the Women's College, Greensboro while she completed a Master of Fine Arts in Dance, also in Greensboro in 1963. Bond completed graduate studies at Connecticut College for Women and Stephen F. Austin State University.

=== Training ===
Bond trained in modern dance with Martha Graham at the College of Dance in Connecticut in addition to José Limón, Donald McKayle, Lucas Hoving, Louis Horst, Twyla Tharp, Yvonne Rainer, Paul Taylor, Alvin Ailey, Murray Louis, Alwin Nikolais, Pauline Koner, Betty Jones. In ballet, she trained at the Peabody Conservatory, the School of Baltimore Ballet, and under dancers Michael Nikoloff, Joffrey School, and Alfredo Corvino. She trained in Renaissance dance with Julia Sutton, Ingrid Brainard, and Charles Garth. Bond trained in Baroque dance with Wendy Hilton. In 19th and early 20th-century dance, she trained with Elizabeth Aldrich. English Country Dancing and Morris dancing at Pinewoods Country Dance and Song Society in Massachusetts. She also attended seminars in "Reading artifacts" and "Popular Dance in Rural Life" at the Farmers' Museum in Cooperstown, New York.

== Career ==
Bond was a dance historian, choreographer, dancer, and writer. Bond was the dance critic for The Baltimore Sun for 14 years. She served as an artist-scholar in residence at Pennsylvania State University, Virginia Tech, and Bluefield College. Bond performed or lectured at George Washington University, University of Pennsylvania, Towson University, and University of Roehampton. She was an instructor of dance and the artistic director of the dance company at Cedar Crest College in Allentown, Pennsylvania, from 1960 to 1962.

Bond served as a faculty advisor for the New York Public Library, the Performing Arts Division of the Library of Congress, and the Harvard Theatre Collection at Houghton Library.

=== Goucher College ===
Bond joined the faculty at Goucher College in 1963 as a member of the Department of Physical Education. She was an instructor for the physical education department in 1967. In 1969, Bond was an assistant professor of physical education and director of dance at Goucher. She was an associate professor of physical education in 1973.

She later served in the Goucher English and Performing Arts departments before the establishment of the Dance Department. In 1975, Bond became the founding chair of the Dance department of Goucher. From 1985 to 1990, she held the Elizabeth Conolly Todd Distinguished Professorship. She uncovered the history of dance in the United Service Organizations.

Bond received a grant from the Maryland Humanities Council in 1991–1992 to conduct research on pre-20th-century American ballroom dances. This work resulted in performances in museums and cultural sites such as the Smithsonian, Colonial Williamsburg, Mount Vernon, the Walters Art Museum, and the Baltimore Museum of Art.

Bond was also a collector of dance sheet music from 1820 through the mid-20th century and dance notation sources from the 16th century through the 20th century.

Bond received an Excellence in Teaching grant from Goucher College to support the inventory and organization of the Estelle Dennis Dance Theatre and Louise Muse-Alicia Markova Collections. Bond developed independent study courses for upper-level students to research these collections.

She used the Estelle Dennis Dance Theatre Collection to pursue research on the history of dance in Baltimore from 1780 to 1960. Bond also worked on a biography of Lillian Moore and the history of dance at Goucher from 1886 through 2008 to serve as a microcosm of dance in higher education.

Bond donated her personal library to Goucher College. It contains approximately 1,000 pieces dating from 1820 through 1962. The collection consists mostly of American and European pop and dance music. It is comprehensive in its coverage of social and theatrical dance, cultural studies of dance, and dance reconstruction between the early 19th and 20th centuries.

==== Chorégraphie Antique ====
Bond was the director and co-founder of Chorégraphie Antique, an ensemble of dance history at Goucher. Bond formed the ensemble with a student to serve as a depository of the history of dance. In 1989, she stated that "what we are trying to do is put dance in the living history museum so it can augment the whole experience [of] going back and living in history...from the 17th century through the latter part of the 19th century dance was more integrated in the lifestyle [than] we have today".

== Community involvement ==
In Summer 1967, Bond taught a dance history course for the Summer Arts Institute hosted at Goucher and funded by the Rockefeller Foundation. Bond served a four-year term on the board of directors for the World Dance Alliance Americas Center where she served as a liaison between the Center and Dance Alliance. In 1986, she held a workshop on 16th-century court dancing for the Maryland Council for Dance at Wilde Lake High School. From 1985 to 1986, Bond was the president of the Congress on Research in Dance. She served on the board of directors of Congress on Research in Dance from 1983 to 1986.

Bond was a member of several organizations including the World Dance Alliance, American Society for Theatre Research, Society of Dance History Scholars, Association of Popular Culture, Maryland Historical Society, the Jane Austen Society of North America, the Baltimore Bibliophiles, Delta Kappa Gamma, and the American Associations for Health, Physical Education, Recreation, and Dance.

== Personal life ==
Bond married William Timothy Bond of Waskom, Texas, on June 25, 1966, at the Goucher College Habeler Memorial Chapel.

Bond died on May 6, 2020, in her home.

== Awards and honors ==
Bond received the Goucher Distinguished Faculty award in 1984. In 1991, she received a distinguished alumni award from University of North Carolina at Greensboro. In 1994, she received the distinguished service award from the Maryland Council for Dance.

== Selected works ==
- Bond, Chrystelle Trump (1976). A Chronicle of Dance in Baltimore, 1780–1814. Marcel Dekker.
- Rogers, Ellis; Rodgers, Chris; Bond, Chrystelle Trump (2004). New Worlds, New Steps: Social Dancing 1780–1900. Stuart Marsden. The Historical Dance Society. OCLC 57969574.

== See also ==
- List of dancers
