= Michael Sutton =

Michael or Mike Sutton may refer to:

- Michael Sutton (actor) (born 1970), American actor
- Mike Sutton (basketball) (born 1956), American basketball coach
- Mike Sutton (American football) (born 1975), American football player
- Mike Sutton (footballer) (born 1944), English footballer
- Mike Sutton (criminologist) (born 1959), English criminologist
- Michael Kelly Sutton (born 1987), software engineer, entrepreneur and minimalist
- Tony Sutton (cricketer) (Michael Antony Sutton, 1921–2019), English cricketer
- Michael H. Sutton, director of Krispy Kreme Corporation
- Michael A. Sutton, American professor
- Mike Sutton, of American musical duo Mike & Brenda Sutton

== See also ==
- Mickey Sutton (disambiguation)
