= Nicholas Sutton =

Nicholas Sutton may refer to:

- Nicholas Sutton (lawyer) (c. 1440–1478), Irish judge
- Nicholas Sutton (MP), Member of Parliament (MP) for Rye
- Nicholas Sutton, a character in the 1986 film Loyalties
- Nicholas Todd Sutton (1961–2020), American serial killer executed in Tennessee
- Nicolas Sutton, a British journalist
