= Richard Sutton =

Richard (also Ritchie, Rich or Dick) Sutton may refer to:

== Politicians ==
- Richard Sutton (MP, died 1634), MP for Newport, Isle of Wight and Newtown, Isle of Wight
- Richard Sutton (British Army officer) (1674–1737), British brigadier and Member of Parliament for Newark; UK ambassador to Denmark
- Sir Richard Sutton, 1st Baronet (1733–1802), English politician
- Richard Sutton (Canadian politician) (c. 1815–1870), member of the Legislative Assembly of New Brunswick
- Dick Sutton (1901–1982), Canadian politician
- Richard Ike Sutton (1915-2001), American politician

== Sportsmen ==
- Richard Sutton (footballer) (born 1965), English former footballer
- Ritchie Sutton (born 1986), English footballer

== Others ==
- Sir Richard Sutton (lawyer) (died c. 1524), English lawyer, co-founder of Brasenose College, Oxford
- Richard Charles Sutton (1834–1915), architect based in Nottingham, England
- Richard Lightburn Sutton (1878–1952), American dermatologist
- Richard John Sutton (1938–2009), New Zealand legal academic and chess player
- Richard S. Sutton (active from 1978), Canadian computer scientist
- Richard Sutton (actor) (born 1978), British actor
- The Sutton baronets
  - Sir Richard Sutton, 4th Baronet (1821–1878), English cricketer and army officer
  - Sir Richard Sutton, 9th Baronet (1937–2021), British businessman murdered by his stepson
