= Thoinot Arbeau =

French author and priest (1520–1595)

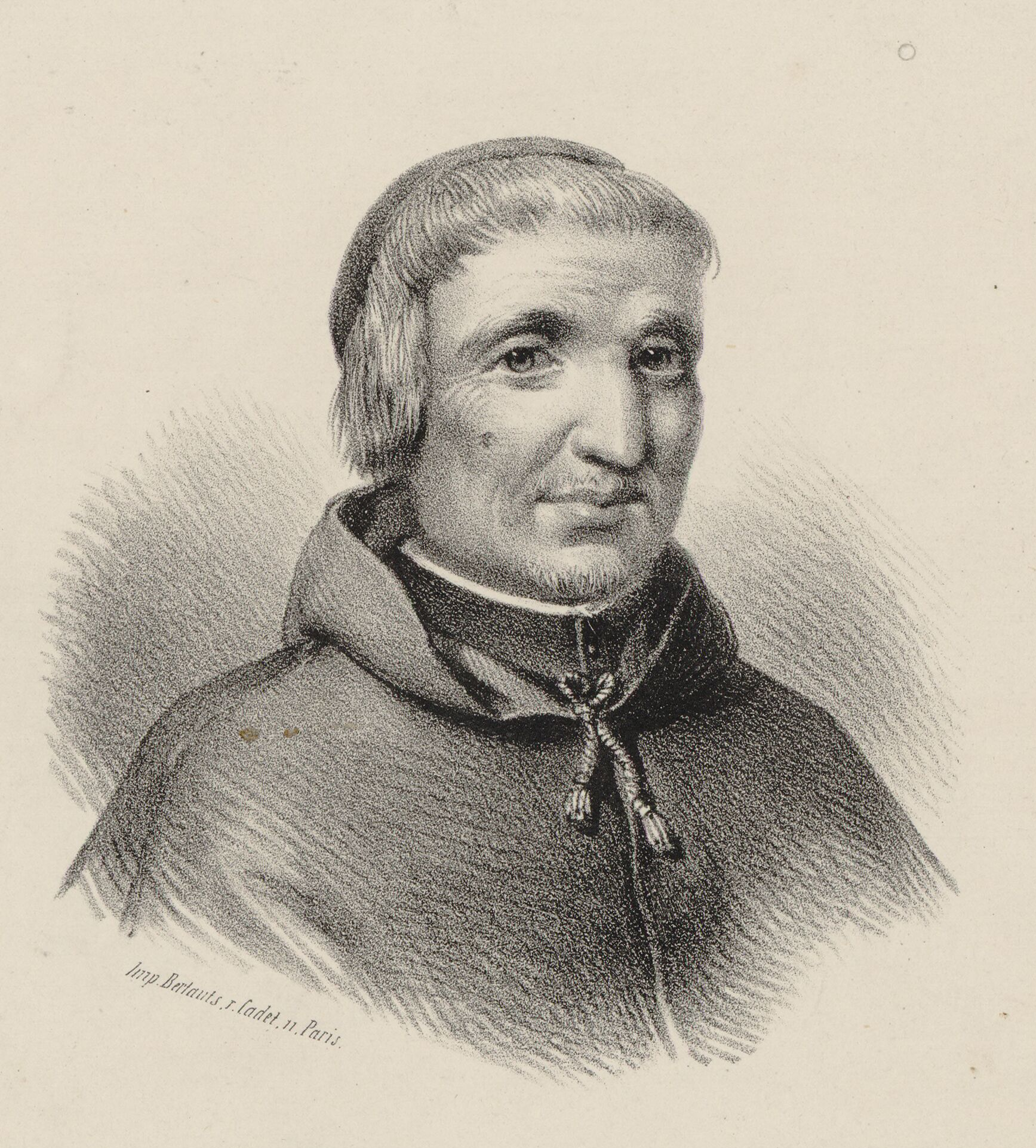
- Born: Jehan Tabourot; March 17, 1520; Dijon
- Died: July 23, 1595 (aged 75); Langres
- Occupation: Cleric

Les Petits Chanteurs de Passy sing the pavane Belle qui tiens ma vie of Thoinot Arbeau

Thoinot Arbeau (French pronunciation: [twano aʁbo]) is the anagrammatic (Note: Prior to later reforms of French orthography, the letter J was not used in French, and thus the name Jehan would have been rendered Iehan.) pen name of French cleric Jehan Tabourot (March 17, 1520 – July 23, 1595). Tabourot is most famous for his Orchésographie, a study of late sixteenth-century French Renaissance social dance. He was born in Dijon and died in Langres.

== Orchésographie and other work ==
Orchésographie, first published in Langres, 1589, provides information on social ballroom behaviour and the interaction between musicians and dancers. It is available online in facsimile and in plain text. An English translation by Mary Stewart Evans, edited by Julia Sutton, is available in print from Dover Publications. It contains numerous woodcuts of dancers and musicians and includes many dance tabulations in which extensive instructions for the steps are lined up next to the musical notes, a significant innovation in dance notation at that time. Orchésographie was partly written as a rebuttal of Calvinist treatises published at the time which argued that dance was an immoral and vain pastime.

He also published on astronomy: Compot et Manuel Kalendrier, par lequel toutes personnes peuvent facilement apprendre et sçavoir le cours du Soleil et de la Lune et semblablement les festes fixes et mobiles que l’on doit célébrer en l’Eglise, suyvant la correction ordonné par notre Saint Pére Grégoire XIII [...Calendar, by which all people can easily learn and know the course of the Sun and of the Moon and similarly, the festivals with fixed and moveable dates which one celebrates in Church, according to the correction ordained by our Father Saint Gregory XIII], Langres: Jehan des Preyz, 1582, (cited in Mémoires de l'Académie des sciences, arts et belles-lettres de Dijon, I (Dijon: Académie de Dijon, 1924), 107).

Thoinot Arbeau was translated into English as Orchesography by Cyril W. Beaumont in 1925, and in a modern edition in 1967.

The pavane "Belle qui tiens ma vie" was arranged by Leo Delibes for his incidental music for Victor Hugo's play "Le roi s'amuse". Other sections were arranged or quoted by Saint-Saens (in the "ballet" from Ascanio) and Peter Warlock (in his Capriol Suite)

"Branle de l'Official" provided the tune for the 20th-century English Christmas carol "Ding Dong Merrily on High".
