= Takeover Bid =

- Genre: Game show
- Presented by: Bruce Forsyth
- Starring: Claire Sutton
- Country of origin: United Kingdom
- Original language: English
- No. of series: 2
- No. of episodes: 28

Production
- Production location: BBC Television Centre
- Running time: 30 minutes

Original release
- Network: BBC1
- Release: 26 May 1990 – 15 July 1991

Takeover Bid is a British game show that aired on BBC1 from 26 May 1990 until 15 July 1991. It was hosted by Bruce Forsyth and assisted by Claire Sutton. The basic premise of Takeover Bid was that of a "reverse game show", where the contestants were given prizes at the beginning of play, and the object of the game was to try and keep them.

== Format ==
Three contestants competed to retain prizes they were given through two rounds. They kept whatever they won in the main game.

=== Round 1: Forsyth's Fact or Fib? ===
Contestants played this round individually. Each contestant was given four small prizes at the outset, all worth a different number of stars from 4 (most valuable) to 1 (a worthless joke prize). The host read a description of an unusual object or event, and the contestant chose one prize to put at risk before deciding if the story was true ("fact") or false ("fib"). If they were correct, they kept the prize and won a bonus to be applied at the end of Round 2; in the first series only, a miss took away the prize and the corresponding number of stars.

=== Round 2: Crazy Cryptics ===
Questions in this round were on the buzzer, and each contained clues to an answer with a double meaning. (E.g. "You can't hang out the washing without her" would lead to "peg," as in the girl's name Peg and a clothes peg.) The first question was open to all three contestants, and the first to respond correctly gained the right to challenge one opponent.

The challenging contestant selected one category from a list of six, then chose one of the opponent's prizes and put up one or more of their own that totalled the same number of stars. (E.g. 3-star vs. 3-star, or 3-star vs. 1-star and 2-star.) A correct buzz-in claimed the other side's prize(s) and the appropriate number of stars, while a miss forfeited them to the other side.

Categories were removed from the board as they were used, and the contestant who won a challenge issued the next one. If neither contestant buzzed-in on a challenge, the one who had not taken part took control.

The round ended when either all six categories had been used or one contestant had claimed all the prizes. At this point, the contestant with the most stars won the game and advanced to the bonus round. All three contestants kept whatever prizes they still had, and any defeated contestant who had responded correctly in Round 1 was given a choice of bonus prizes at the same level as the one they had risked.

The winner received 10 extra stars, and if they had answered correctly in Round 1, they were given further stars corresponding to the prize they had risked. The final star total was rounded up to the next multiple of five, if necessary.

=== Bonus Round: Star Spin ===
The contestant was shown a collection of bonus prizes ranging between 5 and 50 stars based on value. The top prize, usually an exotic trip or similar, was marked at 500 stars.

The contestant chose one or more prizes that matched their star total at the outset, then spun a large five-pointed star mounted on a stationary wheel displaying 10 categories. When it stopped, they had to answer one question in each of the five categories indicated by the points, in any order.

For each of the first four questions, the contestant wagered a portion of their total and chose prizes that added up to the wager. A correct answer added the wager to the total and awarded the prizes to the contestant. However, if they missed, the wager was deducted and the host took away prizes that added up to it.

If the contestant had accumulated at least 100 stars after four questions, they could either end the game at that point or try for the top prize. In the latter case, they had 10 seconds to answer once the host asked the fifth question, and a miss cost them all the bonus prizes. If they had fewer than 100 stars after four questions, the fifth was played normally and they kept all prizes they still had after it was asked. Losing all stars ended the round immediately and forfeited all bonus prizes.

== Transmissions ==
Series	Start date	End date	Episodes
1	26 May 1990	25 August 1990	14
2	8 April 1991	15 July 1991	14
