= Clarence Sutton =

Clarence Sutton may refer to:

- Clarence E. Sutton (1871–1916), U.S. Marine Corps sergeant and Medal of Honor recipient
- Clarence Sutton (American football) (born 1972), American football player and author
