= Keith Sutton =

Keith Sutton may refer to

- Keith Sutton (artist) (1924–1991), British artist and critic
- Keith Sutton (politician) (1896–1973), Australian politician
- Keith Sutton (bishop) (1934–2017), British clergyman

== See also ==
- Sutton (surname)
