= Steve Sutton =

Steve, Steven or Stephen Sutton may refer to:

- Steve Sutton (rugby union) (born 1958), Welsh rugby union player
- Steve Sutton (footballer) (born 1961), English footballer
- Steve Sutton (skydiver), Canadian skydiver
- Stephen Sutton (1994–2014), British charity campaigner
- Stephen John Sutton (born 1964), Australian man imprisoned in Argentina for drug trafficking
