= Kathy Cox (skydiver) =

Canadian skydiver

Medal record

Representing Canada

Women's Parachuting

World Championships
Gold medal – first place	1980 Kasanlyk, Bulgaria	Individual Accuracy

Kathy Cox, CM, now known as Kathy Sutton, is a Canadian skydiver. Cox placed first overall at the Canadian National Parachuting Championships in 1973, 1978, and 1980 (tie). In 1975, while practicing with her team, Cox seriously fractured her fibula and tibia. She returned to jumping in Florida in March 1976. She is also noted for having won the Gold Medal in Women's Individual Accuracy at the XV World Parachuting Championships in Bulgaria in 1980. She was voted Canadian Athlete of the Month in August 1980 by the Sports Federation of Canada, and was CBC Athlete of the Year, also in 1980. She was also the Women's Overall Champion at a 3-country invitational competition in Canton, China in 1981. Cox was named to the Order of Canada in 1984 in recognition of her achievements in sport parachuting. She is married to Steve Sutton, himself a Silver Medalist in Men's Individual Accuracy at the XI World Parachuting Championships in the United States in 1972. After leaving sport parachuting, Cox went on to work as a researcher for DRDC Toronto for many years before retiring.

Kathy Cox's father was internationally known Canadian sculptor, E.B. Cox. For many years, a collection of twenty limestone sculptures by the elder Cox, known as the Garden of the Greek Gods, were easily accessible to the general public including children at Exhibition Place in Toronto, Ontario. However, when a nearby nightclub, Muzik, expanded around 2014, the sculptures were fenced in and no longer accessible to children as Kathy Sutton believed her father would have wanted. Sutton then became involved in lobbying efforts to have her late father's collection moved from the Muzik location behind the fence. Sutton proposed relocating the sculptures to the Rose Garden at Exhibition Place, but expressed a loss of confidence in the willingness of the Exhibition Place Board of Governors to resolve the issue following a meeting in June 2016. The Hercules sculpture was removed temporarily for repairs in December 2018, but finding a permanent solution for Hercules and the other sculptures remained a Herculean task for Sutton. Hercules had been damaged by water accumulating in sand allowed to accumulate by its feet. Sutton expressed fears that the entire body of work has sustained permanent damage due to lack of proper care. The collection was to be moved to the Rose Garden no later than the expiration of the nightclub operator's lease in 2024, but Sutton continued to press for a faster solution. In July 2021 Toronto City Council gave final approval to a new lease with the nightclub, now known as Toronto Event Centre, that will require the sculptures to be moved to the Rose Garden of Exhibition Place by August 2022. Sutton expressed support for the decision, but also sounded a note of caution not to assume anything until the sculptures actually move. By the autumn of 2022, the final relocation of the sculptures to the Rose Garden had been completed. The new location was officially opened on November 1, 2022.

== Bibliography ==
- Grosso, Francesca (2014). "Patient Profile: Kathy Cox (Sutton)". The History of Sunnybrook Hospital: Battle to Greatness. Dundurn. ISBN 978-1-459-72992-6.
