= Alan Sutton (disambiguation) =

Alan Sutton (fl. 1974–2010) is an English publisher.

Alan or Allan Sutton may also refer to:

- Alan Sutton Publishing company
- Allan Sutton (fl. 1347), MP
