= Julia Sutton =

Julia Sutton may refer to:

- Julia Sutton (actress) (1938–2026), English actress and singer
- Julia Sutton (dance historian) (1928–2012), American musicologist and historian
