= CNE Bandshell =

Concert venue in Toronto, Canada

Coordinates: 43.63109°N 79.42293°W

The Bandshell at Exhibition Place
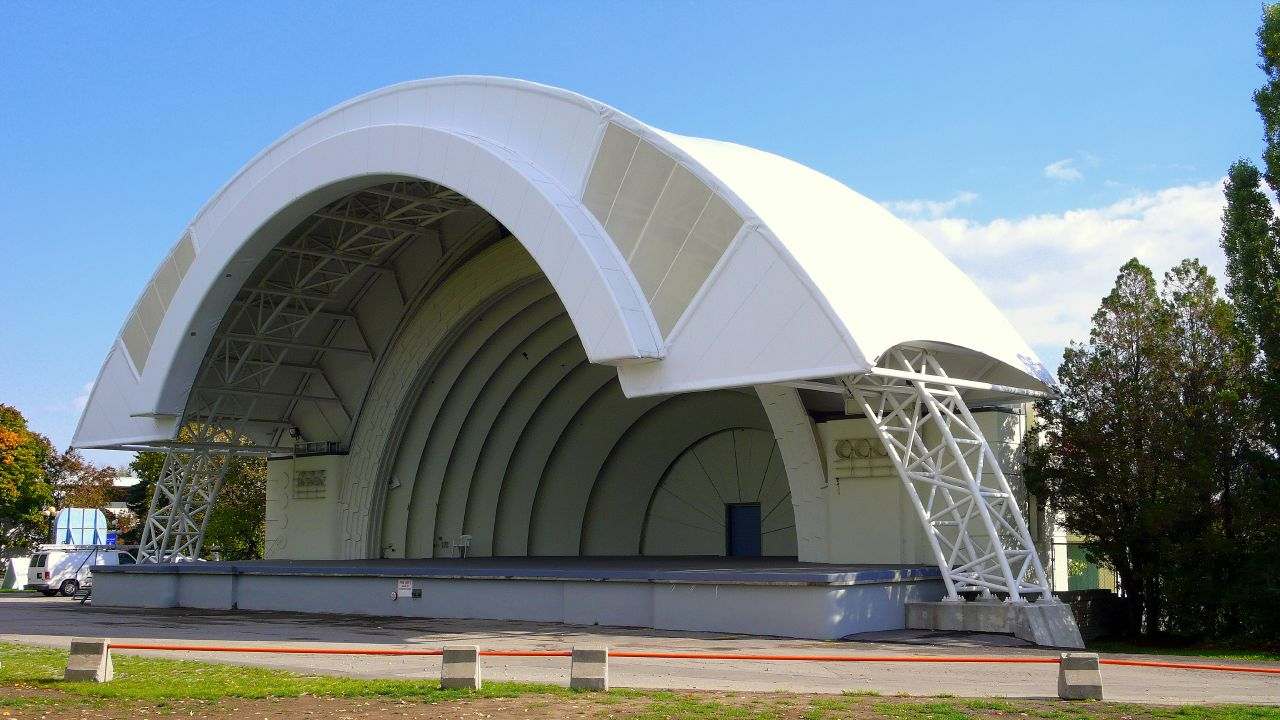
- The Bandshell with an updated canopy extension (ca 2007)

General information
- Inaugurated: August 28, 1936
- Cost: CA$47,000 ($1.04 million in 2025 dollars)
- Owner: City of Toronto

Design and construction
- Architecture firm: Craig and Madill

The CNE Bandshell, also spelled CNE Band Shell, is an open-air concert venue in Toronto, Ontario, Canada. It is located at Exhibition Place on the shores of Lake Ontario. Built in 1936, it hosts the annual music program of the Canadian National Exhibition (CNE) and is also used for festivals and picnic events, for which the "Bandshell Park" can be rented from the City of Toronto.

== Description ==
Inspired by the Hollywood Bowl, the Art Deco-styled shell was built in 1936 according to designs prepared by the Toronto architectural firm of Craig and Madill. It cost CA$47,000 ($1.04 million in 2025 dollars) to construct. The building has two-and-a-half dressing rooms, an office, a "green room", a "switch room" and a sound room. The stage is 338 square metres (3,640 ft^{2}) in size.

The adjacent green space is known as Bandshell Park. In the north-east corner of the park is the Exhibition Place Carillon. At the north-side of the park is the Garden of the Greek Gods collection of sculptures. South of the bandshell is the "Acqua Dolce" Restaurant facing the rose garden.

== History ==
The Bandshell was dedicated on August 28, 1936, by Ontario Premier Mitchell Hepburn, Toronto Mayor Sam McBride and the Lord Mayor of London Sir Percy Vincent at the opening of the Canadian National Exhibition. Highlighting the initial musical program was the Kneller Hall Band of Great Britain and the Toronto Symphony Orchestra.

The Bandshell replaced the 1906 bandstand in the park, one of two bandstands built in the early 1900s, the other was in today's Centennial Square (and subsequently rebuilt). The park was also the site of Canada's tallest flagpole and largest Canadian flag, marked with a small memorial. The flagpole, from a single tree, eventually had to be replaced and was removed. The CNE's largest Canadian flag now is located near the Ricoh Coliseum building. In the 1800s, the park was the site of the Crystal Palace exhibition building, which burnt down and was replaced by the present Horticulture Building to the north of the park.

=== Notable performances ===
The list of famous acts who have performed at the Bandshell is almost innumerable. The list includes America, Louis Armstrong, Frankie Avalon, Big Bad Voodoo Daddy, Blondie, Glen Campbell, Johnny Cash, Chubby Checker, José Feliciano, Foghat, Herman's Hermits, Bob Hope, Tommy James and the Shondells, Quincy Jones, Don McLean, Bob Newhart, Salt-N-Pepa,, Neil Sedaka, and Rick Springfield. The open-air venue has also hosted international artists such as Salman Ahmad, Benny Dayal and Leroy Sibbles; and numerous Canadian acts including Susan Aglukark, April Wine, Big Sugar, The Diamonds,Esther Ghan Firestone, The Guess Who, Guy Lombardo, Joni Mitchell, Moxy Früvous, The New Pornographers, The Stampeders, The Tea Party, Tokyo Police Club and Trooper.

The Bandshell is also used extensively for performance by military bands, such as the United States Navy Band. Entertainer Danny Kaye once guest-conducted the United States Air Force Band.

In 1967, for the Canadian Centennial, the Bandshell was enclosed in a "One Hundredth Birthday Cake", with 10 ft (3.0 m) tall candles, at a cost of CA$50,000 (equivalent to $453,591 in 2025).

On August 25, 2003, as part of the CNE's 125th anniversary celebrations, and as part of Kid's Day, a Guinness World Record was set by the Bandshell as Sesame Street's Elmo hosted the largest Hokey Pokey song and dance routine. The number of participants recorded was 4,431. The record was subsequently broken in 2010.

The Bandshell is the site of the annual opening ceremonies for the CNE, often opened by dignitaries. In the past various Canadian Governor Generals have spoken at the opening ceremonies. Canadian Prime Minister William Lyon Mackenzie King opened the fair in 1947 with a speech. In recent years, Bandshell Park has hosted the Toronto Festival of Beer and the CHIN International Picnic.

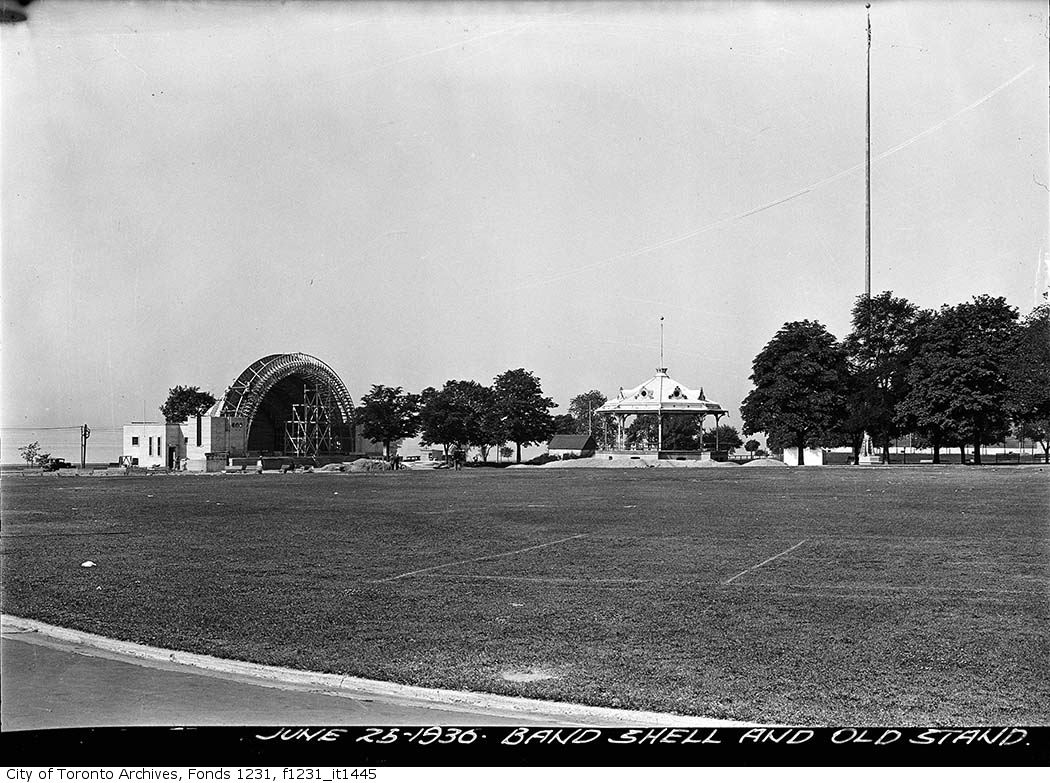
View of bandshell under construction in 1936

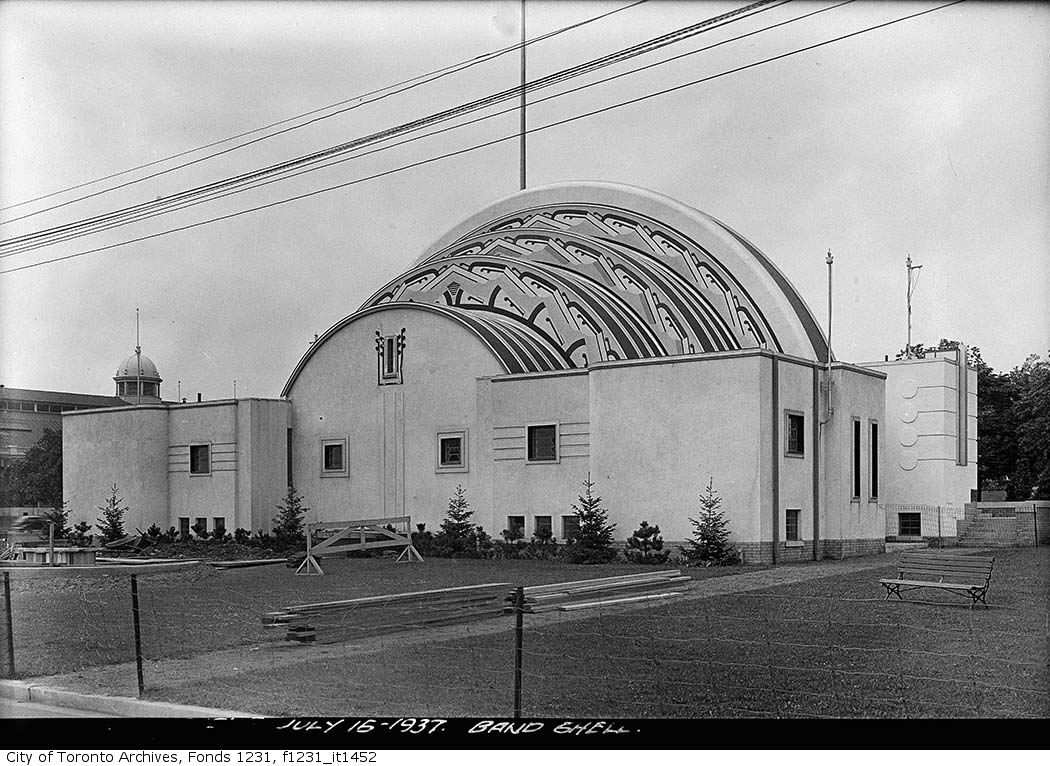
View of south elevation of CNE bandshell in July 1937

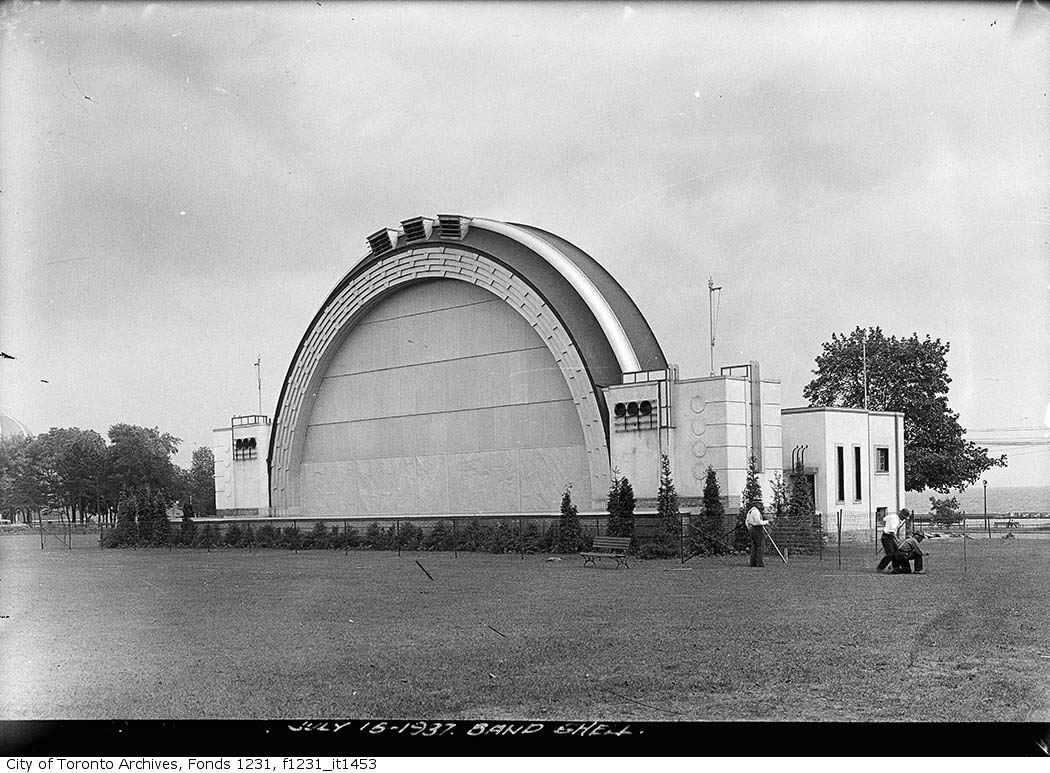
View of north/front elevation in July 1937

== See also ==
- History of the Canadian National Exhibition
- List of music venues in Toronto
