= Garden of the Greek Gods =

Collection of sculptures in Toronto, Ontario, Canada

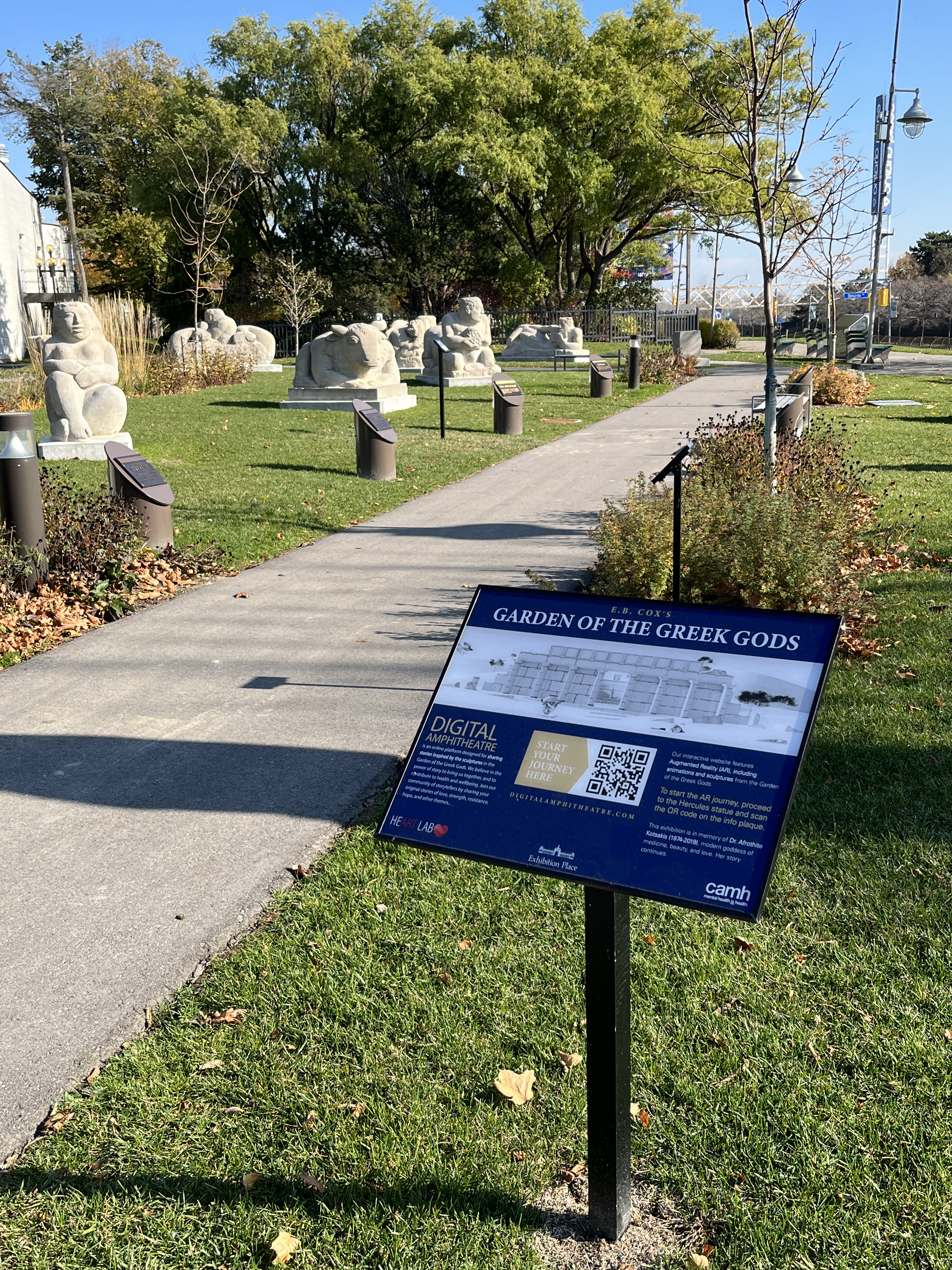
- The Garden of the Greek Gods, 2023
- Location: Toronto, Ontario, Canada
- Location of Exhibition Place in Toronto
- Coordinates: 43°37′51″N 79°25′16″W

The Garden of the Greek Gods is a collection of twenty limestone sculptures by E.B. Cox, installed at Toronto's Exhibition Place, in Ontario, Canada.

== Description and history ==
The sculptures were created during the 1960s; among depicted figures from Greek mythology are Aphrodite, Hercules, Medusa, Orpheus, and The Phoenix.

The sculptures were originally located just south of the Horticultural Building. When that building was leased as an event space, the sculptures were fenced off from the rest of Exhibition Place by the lessee. After a public campaign by Cox's daughter and the resolution of a legal dispute between the Exhibition Place Governors and the nightclub, the sculptures were moved in 2022 to the present location just east of the Rose Garden, south of the CNE Bandshell and are publicly accessible.

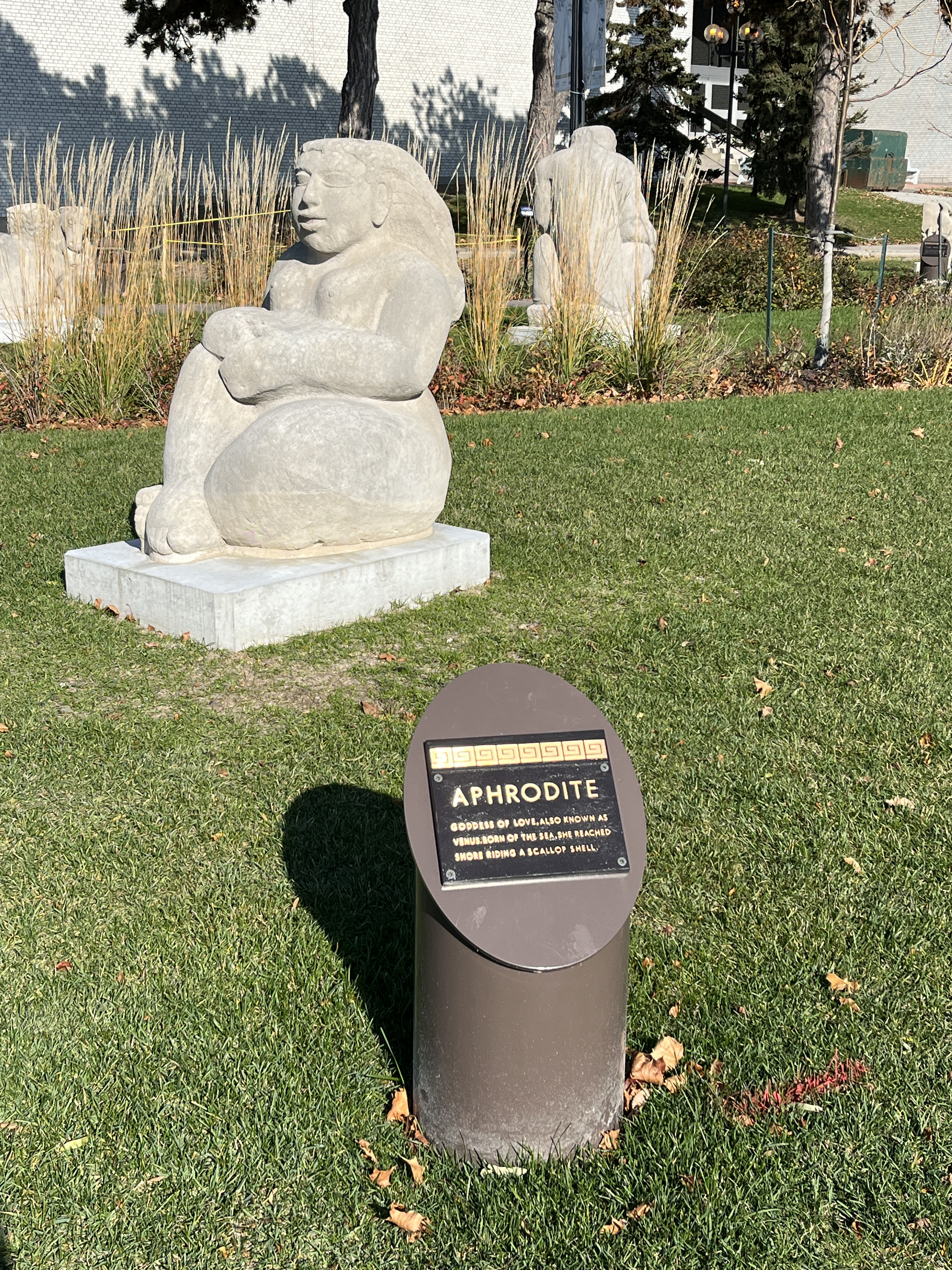
Aphrodite

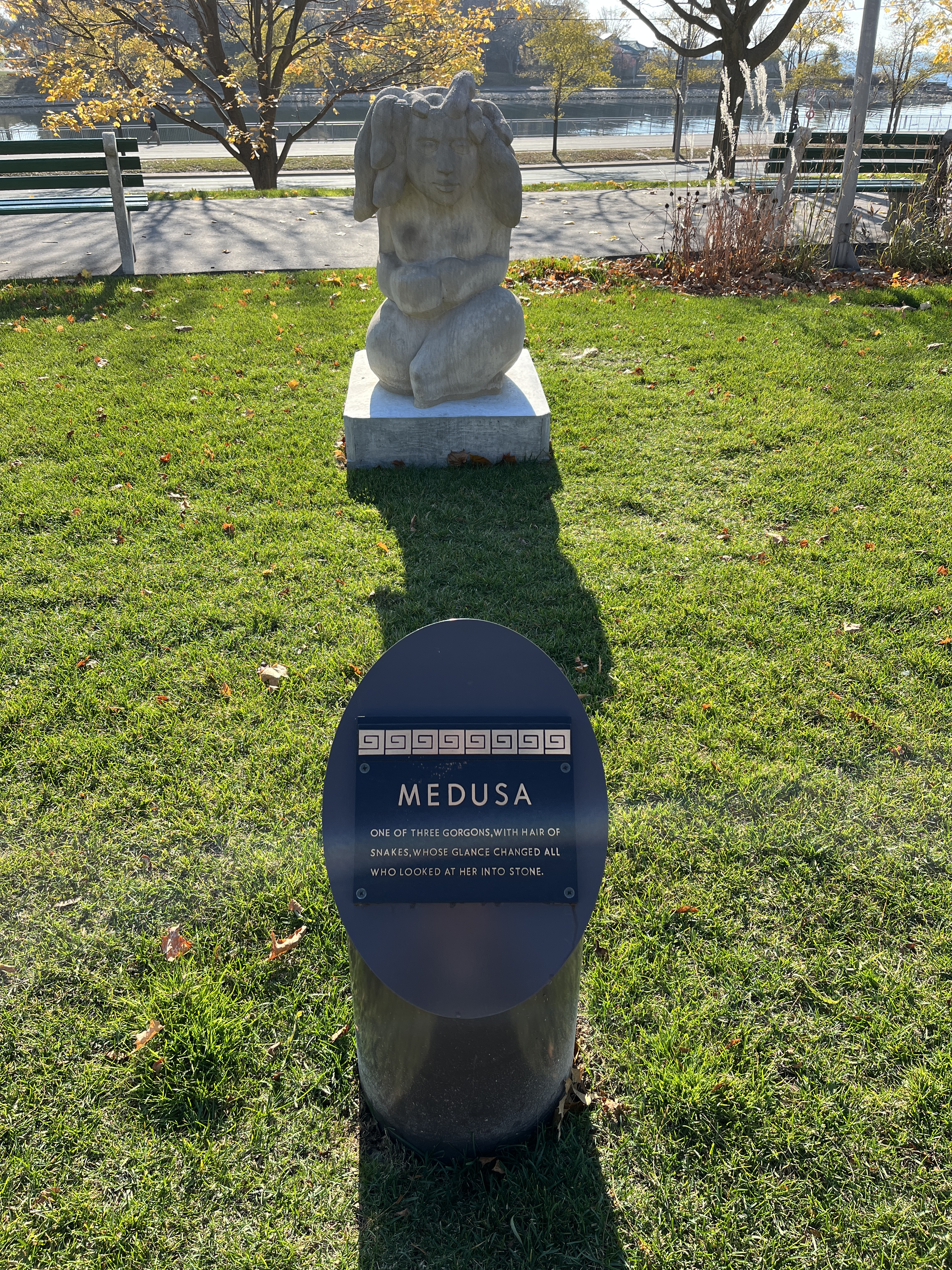
Medusa

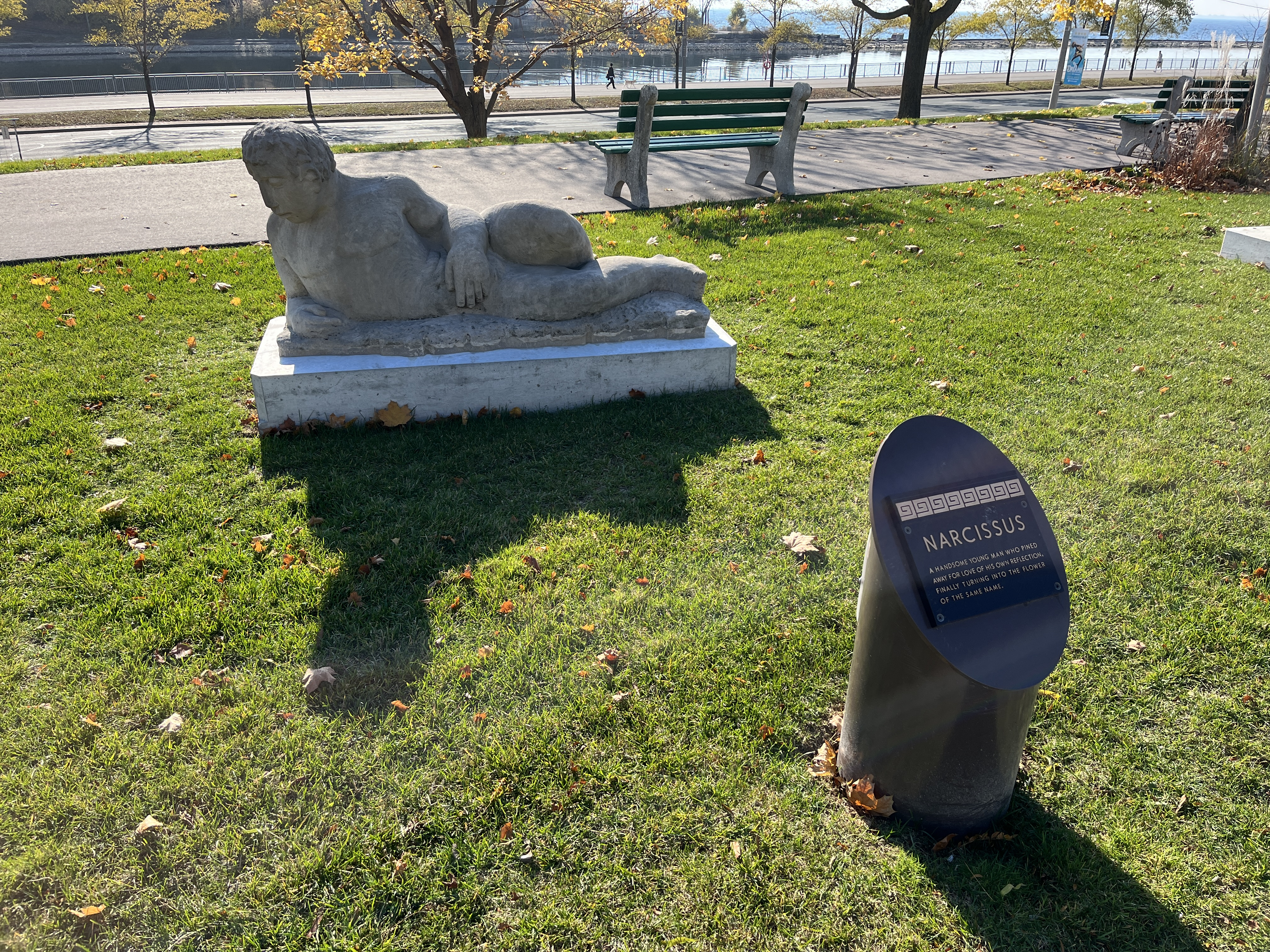
Narcissus

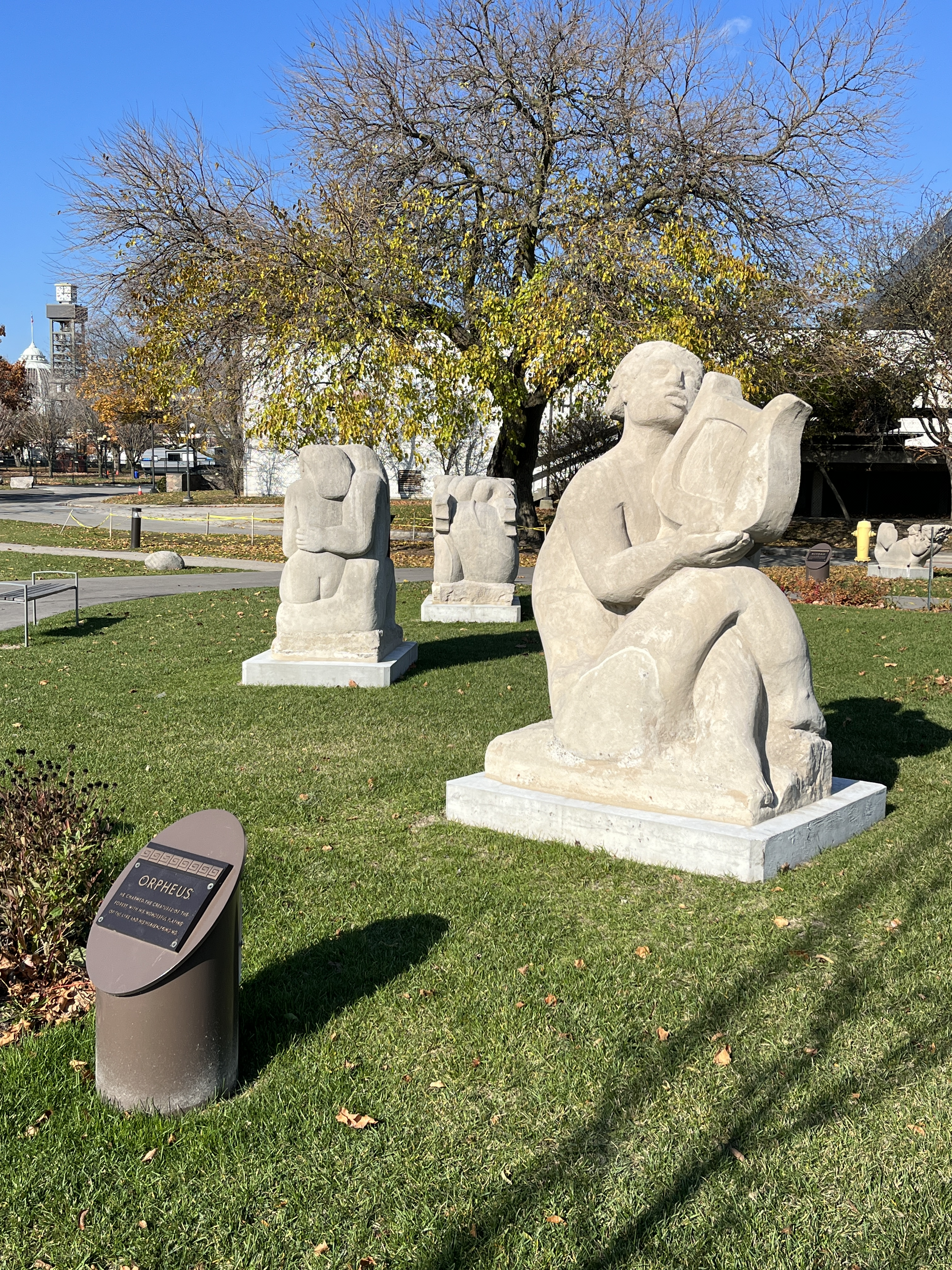
Orpheus

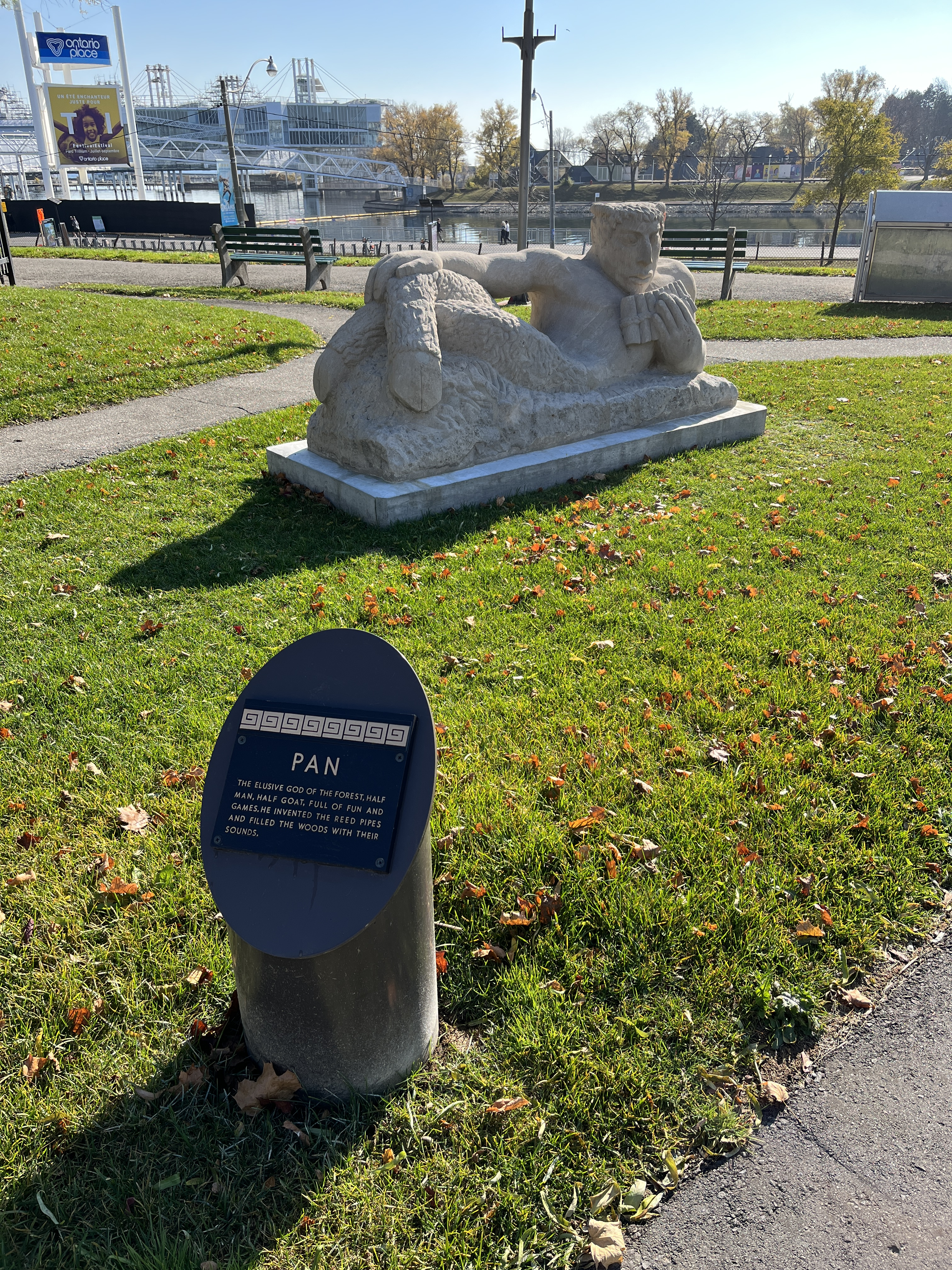
Pan

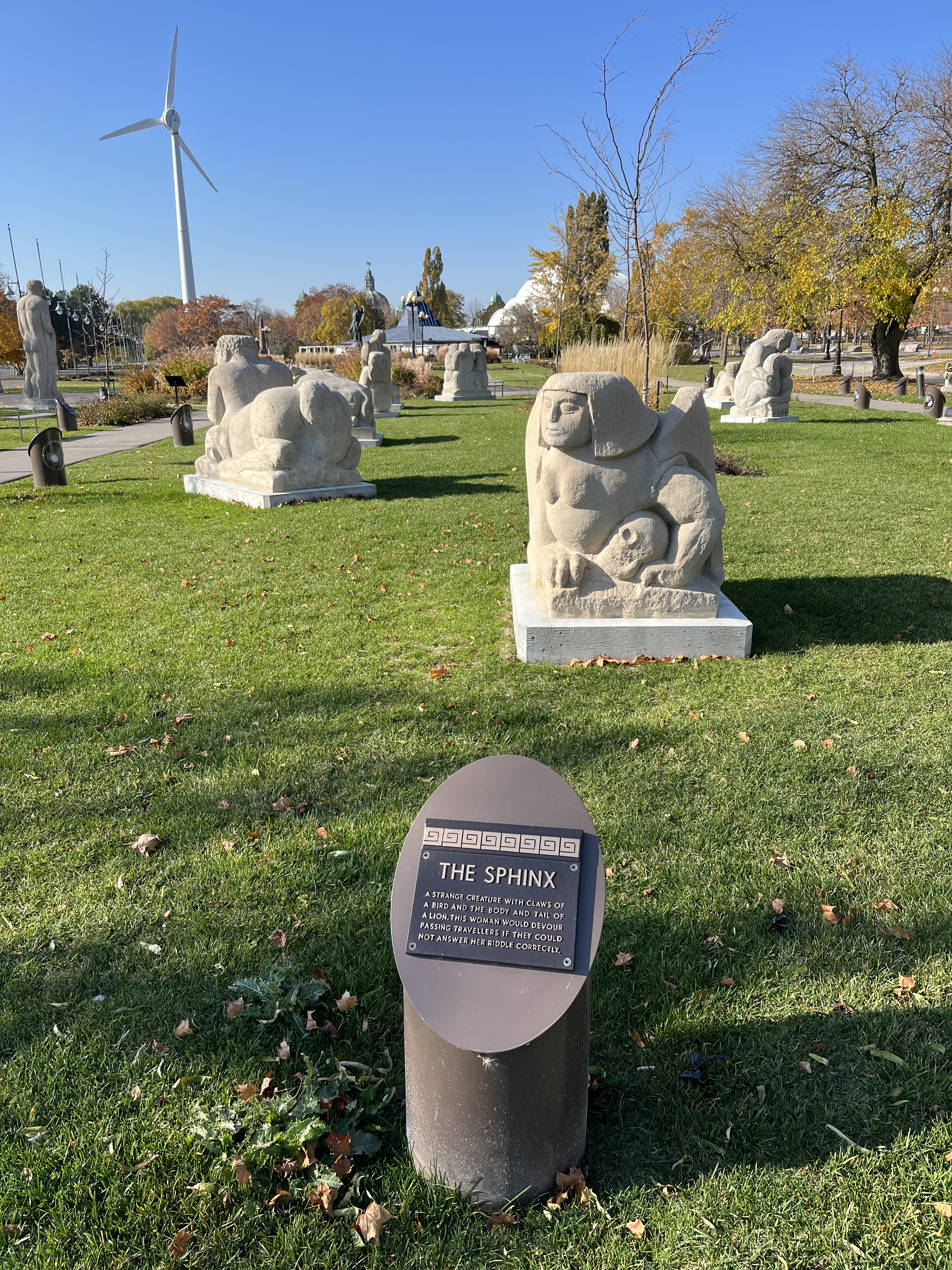
The Sphinx

== See also ==
- Cultural depictions of Medusa and Gorgons
