= Jeannerot =

Jeannerot is a surname. Notable people with the surname include:

- Claude Jeannerot (born 1945), French politician
- Thomas Jeannerot (born 1984), French skydiver
