= E.B. Cox =

Canadian sculptor

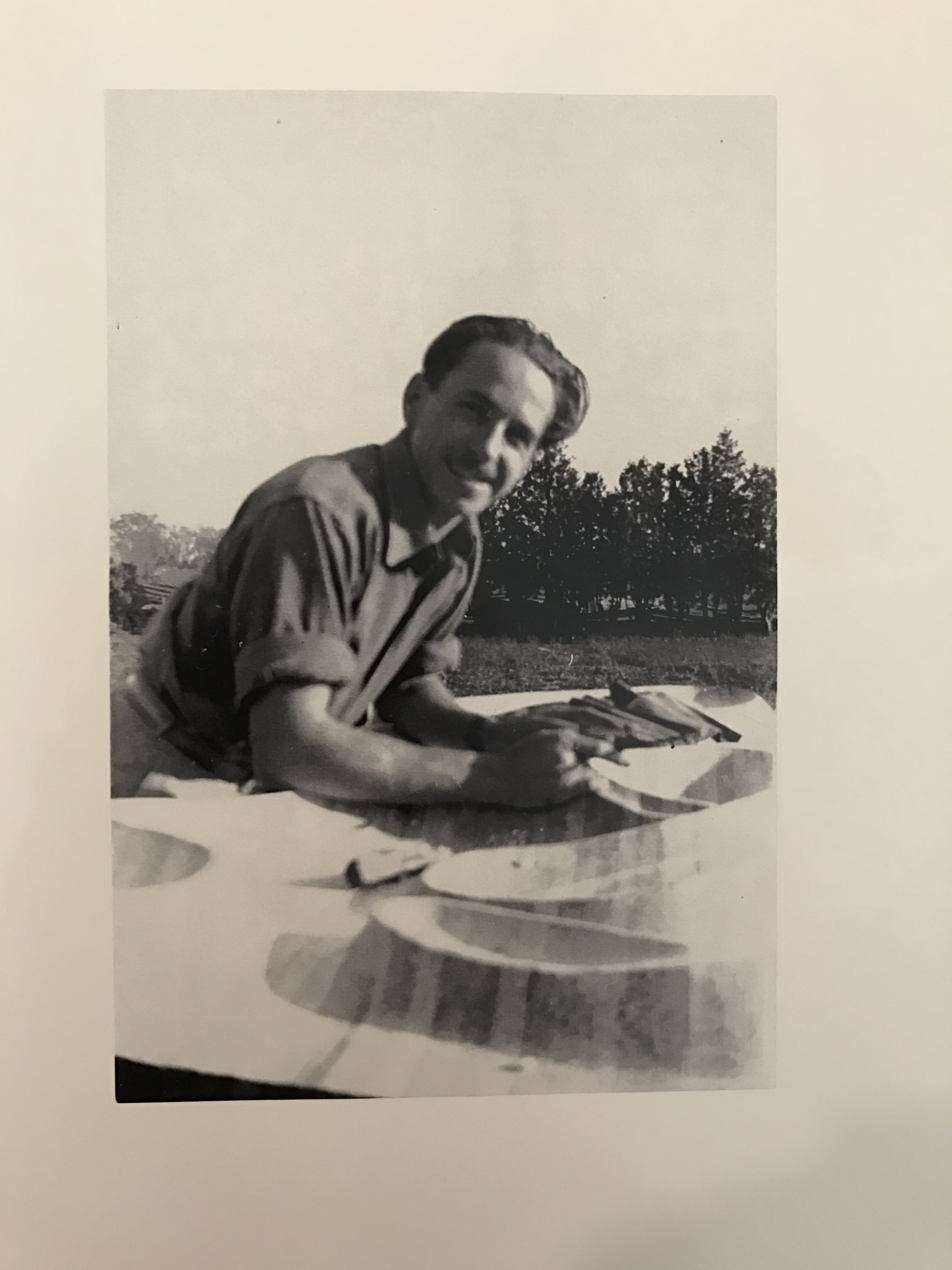
- Cox in 1949
- Born: Elford Bradley Cox; July 15, 1914; Botha, Alberta, Canada
- Died: July 29, 2003 (aged 89); Toronto, Ontario, Canada
- Education: Self-taught
- Known for: sculptor
- Notable work: Garden of the Greek Gods, Spring Break-Up
- Movement: Modern

E.B. Cox (1914–2003) was an internationally known sculptor from Toronto, Canada. He was part of a generation of sculptors such as Charles Daudelin who preferred to carve rather than model their work. Cox carved in wood, stone and even on metal, ceramics, glass and gemstones.

== Life and education ==
Elford Bradley Cox was born in Botha, Alberta, the second son of John and Eva (Tabb). His mother died when he was 13 years old. Cox attended Victoria College, University of Toronto between 1934 and 1938, where he met Professor Barker Fairley, through whom he became acquainted with many artists, including members of the Group of Seven. Cox married Elizabeth Kathleen (née Campbell) in 1948, with whom he had two daughters, Alice Margaret (Sally Fogel) and Kathleen Mary (Kathy Cox-Sutton).

== Artistic career ==
Cox was a member of the Ontario Society of Artists (OSA), Sculptors' Society of Canada (SSC) and the Royal Canadian Academy of Arts (RCA). After serving as an interpreter during World War II and a brief teaching career at Upper Canada College, he took up sculpting full-time in the 1950s. Cox pioneered the use of the compressed-air chisel and other power tools in creating sculpture. The technique enabled him to single-handedly create large-scale installations. Cox has more sculpture on view in Toronto's public places than any other single artist.

== Sculptures ==
Cox is best known for his large works featured at many Toronto-area landmarks, including:

- Spring Break-Up (Fish Fountain), 1958, Park Hyatt Hotel, Avenue Road north of Bloor St., Toronto. (Moved in March 2018 to Ingram Gallery, 24 Hazelton Avenue, while the hotel is being renovated.) This sculpture is one of the first non-architectural decorative sculptures introduced into Toronto for the purpose of making the courtyard of a building more attractive.
- Draped Figures, 1959, at Victoria University, University of Toronto (Note: these three sculptures were put into temporary storage in 2014). This work has been described as one that "hinted at the abstraction to finally come to the city...change was around the corner, and in the 1960s Toronto did finally experience a revolution in public sculpture."
- Great White Lady, 1960, on display at McMaster University, Hamilton, Ontario.
- The Garden of the Greek Gods, 1963, comprising twenty sculptures and a marker stone. On public display at Exhibition Place in Toronto until 2014. Since then, the sculpture garden has been hidden behind the fences of Muzik Nightclub, now called Toronto Event Centre.
- The Days of the Year, 1968, bronze and glass, Macdonald Block (Ontario Government building), Toronto (temporarily in storage during building renovations). Among other leading Canadian sculptors of the 1960s, Cox was chosen to produce a work of public art for this huge new government building. It is one of his rare constructive pieces.
- Youth and the Environment, 1972, on display at Exhibition Place in Toronto.
- Bear Family, c.1970, on display at Centre Island, Toronto.
- A Druid's Alphabet, 1961, two large door panels, on display at Glendon Campus, York University, Toronto.
- Bears in limestone (3), 1970–1971, on display at Exhibition Place in Toronto.
- Bear, 1979, on display at the Guild Inn, Scarborough (created with assistance from Michael Clay).
- Seated Lady, 1967, on display at the Peel County Court House in Brampton, Ontario.
- Books 1967, on display in front of Richmond Hill High School, Richmond Hill, Ontario.

== Garden of the Greek Gods controversy and relocation ==
Cox's work became the subject of a dispute in 2014 when the 20 limestone sculptures comprising the Garden of the Greek Gods, created by Cox in the 1960s, were hidden from view at the Muzik nightclub (now called Toronto Event Centre). This sculpture garden was donated to the City of Toronto in 1979 and installed on the south lawn of the Horticulture Building, where it was enjoyed by the art-loving public for over 30 years. When the nightclub built a huge outdoor patio in 2014, it fenced in the entire collection and made it inaccessible to the public. Family and friends expressed concern both about possible damage to the work and the fact that it is no longer freely accessible to children. Cox had originally intended that children be able to play on the sculptures. At an Exhibition Place Board of Governors meeting in June 2016, city councillor Mike Layton accused Muzik owner Zlatko Starkovski of holding the sculptures hostage to extract more lenient rules from the board as to the type of events Muzik is allowed to host. The board, however, allowed Starkovski's proposed changes without requiring the return of the sculptures. In October 2016, the issue was debated by Toronto City Council; Council voted 36–2 to include the return of the Garden of the Greek Gods sculptures to the city as a condition of amending Muzik's lease on Exhibition Place grounds. In July 2021, Council gave final approval to a new lease with Toronto Event Centre that will require the sculptures to be moved to the Rose Garden of Exhibition Place by August 2022. Cox' daughter Kathy Cox-Sutton expressed support for the decision, but also sounded a note of caution not to assume anything until the sculptures actually move. By the autumn of 2022, the final relocation of the sculptures to the Rose Garden had been completed. The new location was officially opened on November 1, 2022.

=== Digital Amphitheatre ===
The sculptures of the Garden of the Greek Gods will be featured in an interactive online platform where people can share multimedia stories either directly at the location near the Rose Garden or through the Digital Amphitheatre website. The platform is being created by CAMH and HeARTLab, organizations focused on exploring the links between art and mental health.
