= Kelly Sutton (disambiguation) =

Kelly Sutton is the NASCAR Camping World Truck Series driver.

Kelly Sutton may also refer to:

- Kelly Sutton, fictional character in Once Upon a Texas Train
- Michael Kelly Sutton, software developer, commonly known as Kelly Sutton
- Kelly Sutton, entertainment reporter, Grand Ole Opry announcer, and media personality for Amazon Music and WSM, based in Nashville, Tennessee
