= Fabritio Caroso =

Italian Renaissance dancing master

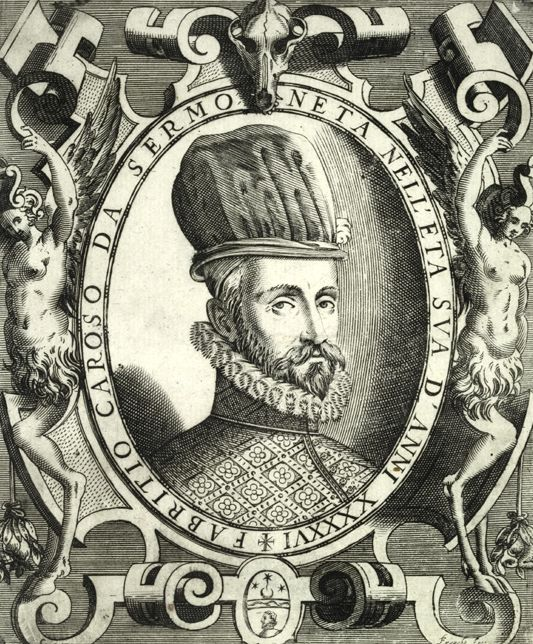
Fabritio Caroso, a woodcut from Nobiltà di Dame

Fabritio Caroso da Sermoneta (1526/1535 – 1605/1620) was an Italian Renaissance dancing master and a composer or transcriber of dance music.

His dance manual Il Ballarino was published in 1581, with a subsequent edition, significantly different, Nobiltà di Dame, printed in 1600 and again after his death in 1630. The work has been published in English as Courtly Dance of the Renaissance by Julia Sutton.

Both manuals have been printed in facsimile edition. Many of the dances of Fabritio Caroso's manuals are meant for two dancers with a few for four or more dancers. These manuals offer a great deal of information to dance historians and musicologists alike in that each description of a dance is accompanied by music examples with lute tablature and directions about how each music example is to be played. Many of the dances also contain dedications to noble women of the sixteenth and early seventeenth centuries.

== Bibliography ==
- Caroso, Fabritio. Courtly Dance of the Renaissance: A New Translation and Edition of the Nobiltà di Dame (1600). Edited and translated by Julia Sutton. New York: Dover Publications, 1995
