= Claire Sutton =

Claire Sutton may refer to:

- Claire Sutton (QVC presenter) (born 1967), British television presenter
- Claire Sutton (Yes Prime Minister), a character in the British stage play Yes Prime Minister
