= Clarence Sutton (American football) =

American football player (born 1972)

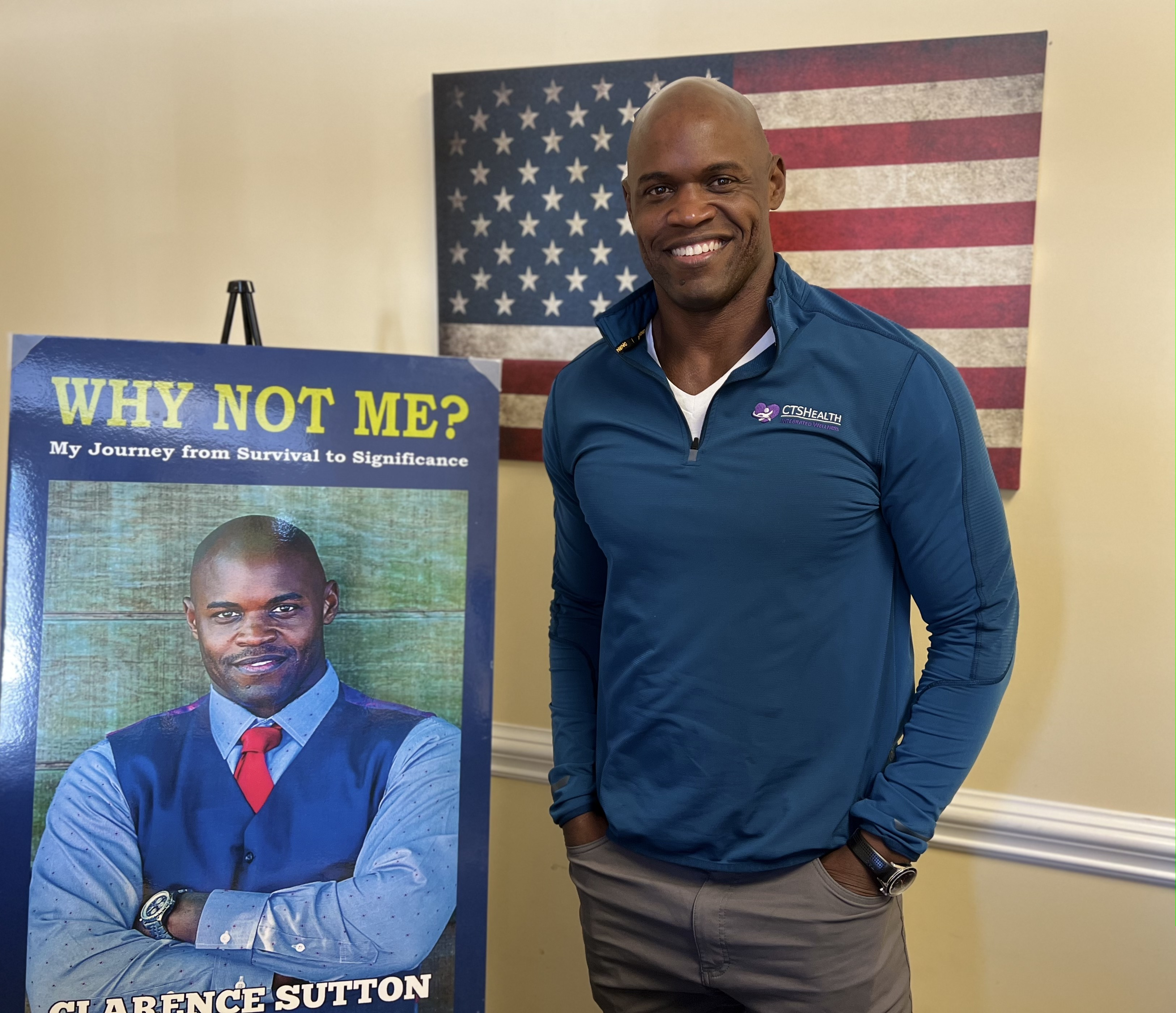
- Born: December 29, 1972 (age 52); Chicago, Illinois
- Occupations: Entrepreneur, author, speaker
- Website: www.ctshealth.org

Clarence Edward Sutton is an author, entrepreneur, motivational speaker, and former NFL football player who played for the Appalachian State Mountaineers and the Chicago Bears. He is currently the founder and President of a private agency that provides mental health, foster care, and adoption services to high-risk populations throughout North Carolina, South Carolina, Florida, and Illinois. Sutton is also the author of Why Not Me – From Survival to Significance, a biography that explores his early life growing up in inner city Chicago, and published his newest book, Is It Us?, in January 2023.

== Early life ==
Sutton was born on December 29, 1972, and grew up in Austin, Chicago, a suburb of Chicago. He pursued football, baseball, and track at Austin Community Academy High School.

== Football career ==
Sutton first attended Triton College, a two-year community college, where he continued to play football. When the school's football program was eliminated, Sutton was recruited by several 4-year colleges, and ultimately selected Appalachian State University. At Appalachian, Sutton majored in criminal justice and played for the Appalachian State Mountaineers. During his time with the Mountaineers, Sutton and his teammates became the first North Carolina Division I team to go undefeated.

In 1996, Sutton was signed by the Chicago Bears as a free agent, where he played until 1997. While preparing to sign with the Kansas City Chiefs, he learned that he was at risk for long-term disabilities and nerve damage should he continue to play football. Sutton decided to retire from the sport.

== Post-athletic career ==
After leaving his athletic career, Sutton worked for the Texas Juvenile Probation System in Beaumont, Texas, helping to guide and mentor at-risk children. In 1998, he and his family moved to Concord, North Carolina, where he enrolled in the local police academy. Upon graduation, Sutton became a law enforcement officer for the Concord City Police Department, and later a deputy sheriff for the Mecklenburg County Sheriff's Department.

In 1999, Sutton began working with the North Carolina State Medicaid program, where he learned the ins-and-outs of the mental health field. When North Carolina voted to divest itself from various public programs, Sutton decided to start his own private venture that would provide opportunities and resources to the state's underserved areas. In 2001, he founded Carolina Therapeutic Services, Inc. (CTS), formerly Greater Metrolina Mental Health Services. This private agency provides mental health services, foster care, and adoption to high-risk populations in North Carolina, South Carolina, and Illinois.

== Works ==
Sutton published his first biography, Why Not Me – From Survival to Significance, in 2017. Proceeds from the book's sales benefited various CTS Community Development programs.

In January 2023, Sutton published a second book, Is It Us?
