= Henry Sutton =

Henry Sutton may refer to:

- Henry Sutton (instrument maker) (1637–1665), English instrument-maker
- Henry Gawen Sutton (1837–1891), English physician
- Henry Sutton (inventor) (1855–1912), Australian inventor
- Henry Sutton (sailor) (1868–1936), Olympic sailor
- Henry Sutton (novelist) (born 1963), British author
- Henry Sutton, a pseudonym for American author David R. Slavitt
- Henry Septimus Sutton (1825–1901), English journalist and temperance activist
- Henry Sutton (priest), Anglican priest
- Sir Henry Sutton (judge) (1845–1920), English lawyer and High Court judge
- Henry Sutton (MP) (died 1416), MP for Warwickshire and Nottinghamshire
