= Elizabeth Sutton =

Elizabeth Sutton may refer to:

- Lizzie Sutton, fictional character in the TV series, Lincoln Heights
- Betty Sutton (born 1963), politician from Ohio
