= Chris Sutton (disambiguation) =

Chris Sutton (born 1973) is a retired English footballer.

Chris Sutton or Christopher Sutton may also refer to:

- Christopher Sutton (cyclist), Australian cyclist
- Christopher Sutton, American actor, currently in the North American tour of Spamalot
- Chris Sutton, Scottish singer who released his self-titled debut album in 1986, produced by Peter Wolf
- Chris Sutton, musician for the bands Dub Narcotic Sound System, and C.O.C.O.
- Chris Sutton, former drummer for the band The Old Haunts
