= Peter Sutton =

Peter Sutton is the name of:

- Peter Sutton (anthropologist) (born 1946), Australian social anthropologist and linguist
- Peter Sutton (basketball) (1931–1985), Australian Olympic basketball player
- Peter Sutton (sound engineer) (1943–2008), American sound engineer
- Peter Sutton (bishop) (1923–2013), Anglican bishop of Nelson
- Peter Alfred Sutton (1934–2015), Roman Catholic bishop
- Peter Sutton (priest) (born 1959), Archdeacon of the Isle of Wight
- Peter C. Sutton (born 1949), American art historian
