= Charles Sutton (cricketer, born 1906) =

English-Chilean cricketer and Royal Navy Volunteer Reserve officer

Personal information
- Full name: Charles Henry Sutton
- Born: 17 December 1906; North Bierley, Yorkshire, England
- Died: 29 July 1945 (aged 38); Gosport, Hampshire, England
- Batting: Right-handed
- Bowling: Right-arm slow

Career statistics
Competition	First-class
Matches	1
Runs scored	10
Batting average	10.00
100s/50s	–/–
Top score	10
Balls bowled	30
Wickets	0
Bowling average	–
5 wickets in innings	–
10 wickets in match	–
Best bowling	–
Catches/stumpings	–/–
- Source: Cricinfo, 21 June 2019

Charles Henry Sutton (17 December 1906 – 29 July 1945) was an English-Chilean first-class cricketer and Royal Naval Volunteer Reserve officer. Sutton played first-class cricket for the South American cricket team in 1932, before serving in the Second World War with the Royal Naval Volunteer Reserve. Toward the end of the war he fell seriously ill, dying just over a month before its conclusion.

== Life and military career ==
Sutton was born at North Bierley in Yorkshire to Charles Evans Sutton and his wife, Annie Gertrude Sutton. He was educated at The Leys School. After completing his education, he moved to Valparaíso in Chile to help in his father's company which was based in the city. Having played cricket for club teams in Chile, Sutton was selected to tour England with the South American cricket team in 1932, making a single first-class appearance on the tour against Sir J. Cahn's XI at West Bridgford. Batting once in the match, Sutton was dismissed for 10 runs in the South Americans first-innings by Denys Morkel. With his right-arm slow bowling, he bowled a total of five wicketless overs across the match. He played two minor matches for Chile against Argentina in 1938.

Sutton later returned to England, where he served in the Royal Naval Volunteer Reserve in the Second World War. He served as a seaman aboard the requisitioned trawler HMT Lady Lillian, which was sunk west of Ireland in March 1941. For his service aboard the ship, he was mentioned in dispatches in July 1941. He was promoted to the temporary rank of sub-lieutenant in June 1944. He fell seriously ill in 1945, dying at the Royal Hospital Haslar in Gosport in July 1945. He was buried there at the Royal Naval Cemetery.
