= Edward Sutton =

Edward, Ed or Eddie Sutton may refer to:

- Edward Sutton, 2nd Baron Dudley (c. 1460 – 1532), English nobleman
- Edward Sutton, 4th Baron Dudley (1525–1586), English nobleman
- Edward Sutton, 5th Baron Dudley (1567–1643), English nobleman
- Edward H. Sutton, inventor, author, and state legislator in North Carolina
- Ed Sutton (South Carolina politician)
- Ed Sutton (American football) (1935–2008), American football player
- Eddie Sutton (1936–2020), American college basketball coach
- Eddy Sutton (born 1948), English badminton player
