= Thomas Jeannerot =

French professional skydiver

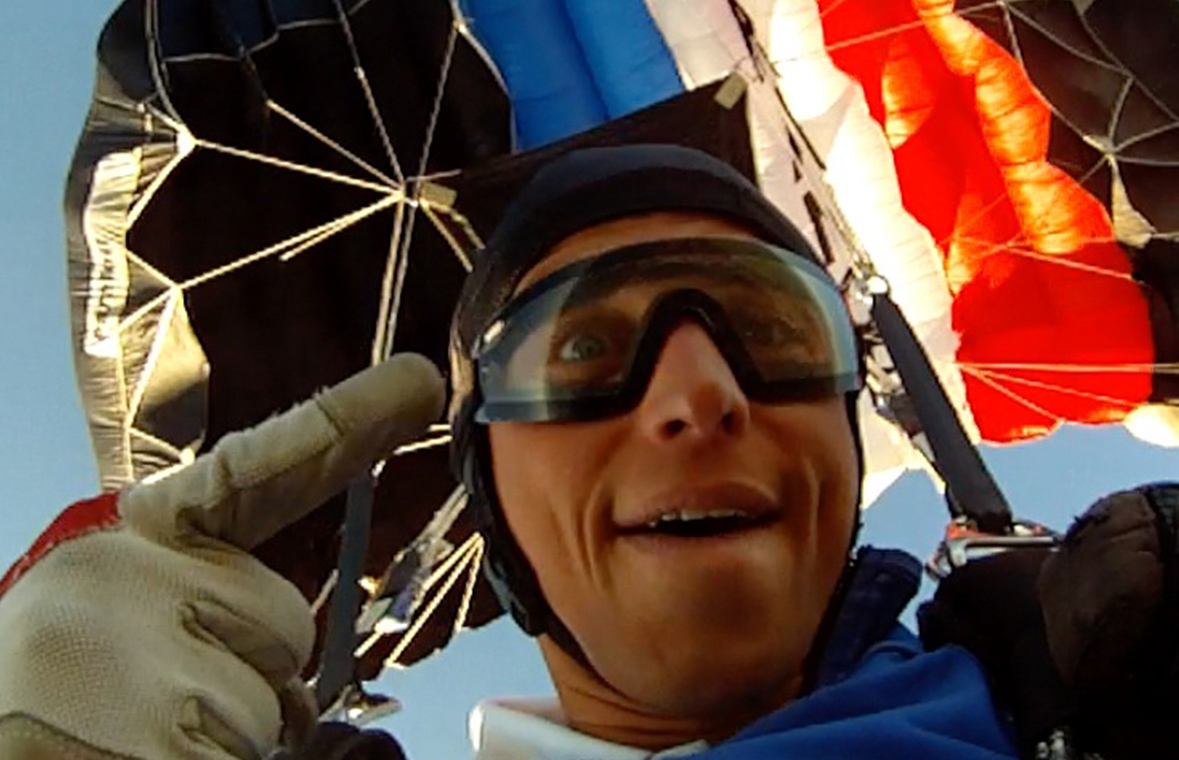

Personal information
- Nationality: French
- Born: 30 March 1984 (age 42) Rennes, France
- Years active: 2004–2024
- Website: www.thomasjeannerot.com

Sport
- Country: France
- Sport: Skydiving : Accuracy Landing & Style
- Club: CERP Alsace
- Coached by: Jacques Baal
Medal record
Representing France
Event	1st	2nd	3rd
World Championship	1	3	7
World Cup	5	2	6
European Championship	0	2	3
France Championship	12	10	8
Total	18	17	24

Thomas Jeannerot (born 30 March 1984) is a retired French professional parachuter. He was formerly a member of the French Team of Parachuting in the discipline of accuracy landing.

He was a member of the Accuracy Landing world champion team in 2010; and came second in the Men's Accuracy Championship in 2011.

He set a world record for Team Accuracy with the French Team in 2011 (with a perfect jump of 0 cm).

In 2013, he broke the individual world record for Accuracy Landing.

== Career ==
In August 2011, Jeannerot was a member of the team that broke the European and world records for Accuracy Landing, with a combined distance of 1 x 0,00 + 0,04 m.

In December 2013, Jeannerot broke the world record for Individual Accuracy Landing with a distance of 0.02m. As of June 2026, this record stands unbroken.

In July 2021, he performed Johann Zarco's tandem initiation jump.

== Achievements ==
=== World Record ===
- (gold) World Record of Accuracy Landing Individual – 2013 (Dubai)
- (gold) World Record of Accuracy Landing Team – 2011 (Kikinda)

=== International ===
==== World & European Championship ====
- (bronze) 3rd of World Championship – Individual Overall – 2024 (Prostejov)
- (bronze) 3rd of World Championship – Team Overall – 2024 (Prostejov)
- (bronze) 3rd of World Championship – Team Accuracy Landing – 2024 (Prostejov)
- (bronze) 3rd of European Championship – Individual Overall – 2023 (Ravenna)
- (bronze) 3rd of European Championship – Team Overall – 2023 (Ravenna)
- (bronze) 3rd of World Championship – Team Overall – 2022 (Strakonice)
- (bronze) 3rd of World Championship in Team Accuracy Landing – 2022 (Strakonice)
- (silver) Vice World Champion in Team Accuracy Landing – 2021 (Kemerovo)
- (silver) Vice World Champion of Team Overall – 2021 (Kemerovo)
- (bronze) 3rd of World Championship in Individual Accuracy Landing – 2018 (Erden)
- (bronze) 3rd of World Championship – Individual Overall – 2018 (Erden)
- (silver) Vice European Champion in Individual Accuracy Landing – 2011 (Kikinda)
- (silver) Vice European Champion in Team Accuracy Landing – 2011 (Kikinda)
- (bronze) 3rd of European Championship – Team Overall – 2011 (Kikinda)
- (gold) World Champion of Individual Overall – 2010 (Niksic)
- (silver) Vice World Champion of Team Overall – 2010 (Niksic)

==== World Cup ====
- (bronze) 3rd Team Accuracy Landing World Cup – 2024 (Belluno)
- (gold) 1st Team Accuracy Landing World Cup – 2024 (Bled)
- (bronze) 3rd Team Accuracy Landing World Cup – 2024 (Cahors)
- (gold) 1st Team Accuracy Landing World Cup – 2023 (Dubai)
- (silver) 2nd Individual Accuracy Landing World Cup – 2023 (Belluno)
- (bronze) 3rd Individual Accuracy Landing World Cup – 2022 (Locarno)
- (gold) 1st Team Accuracy Landing World Cup – 2018 (Peiting)
- (gold) 1st Individual Accuracy Landing World Cup – 2017 (Locarno)
- (gold) 1st Team Accuracy Landing World Cup – 2014 (Peiting)
- (bronze) 3rd Team Accuracy Landing World Cup – 2013 (Locarno)
- (bronze) 3rd Individual Accuracy Landing World Cup – 2012 (Bled)
- (bronze) 3rd Team Accuracy Landing World Cup – 2012 (Bled)
- (silver) 2nd Individual Accuracy Landing World Cup – 2005 (Belluno)

==== International Trophy ====
- (gold) Winner of the 4th Dubaï International Parachuting Championship – Individual Accuracy Landing- 2013 (Dubai)
- (gold) Winner of Marocco Trophy – Style – 2013 (Beni Mellal)
- (gold) Winner of Marocco Trophy – Team Accuracy Landing – 2013 (Beni Mellal)
- (gold) Winner of Accuracy European Master of Strasbourg – Team Accuracy Landing – 2012 (Strasbourg)
- (silver) 2nd of Accuracy European Master of Strasbourg – Team Accuracy Landing – 2011 (Strasbourg)

=== National ===
==== France Championship ====
- (gold) France Champion – Style – 2023 (Gap-Tallard)
- (silver) Vice France Champion – Individual Overall – 2023 (Gap-Tallard)
- (silver) Vice France Champion – Team Accuracy Landing – 2023 (Gap-Tallard)
- (silver) Vice France Champion – Overall – 2022 (Bouloc)
- (silver) Vice France Champion – Style – 2022 (Bouloc)
- (bronze) 3rd of France Championship – Accuracy Landing – 2022 (Bouloc)
- (gold) France Champion – Team Accuracy Landing – 2022 (Bouloc)
- (gold) France Champion – Team Accuracy Landing – 2021 (Agen)
- (silver) Vice France Champion – Style – 2021 (Agen)
- (bronze) 3rd of France Championship – Accuracy Landing – 2021 (Agen)
- (bronze) 3rd of France Championship – Style – 2021 (Agen)
- (gold) France Champion – Team Accuracy Landing – 2020 (Laval)
- (silver) Vice France Champion – Style – 2020 (Laval)
- (bronze) 3rd of France Championship – Overall – 2020 (Laval)
- (gold) France Champion – Accuracy Landing (upward) – 2020 (Laval)
- (gold) France Champion – Accuracy Landing – 2019 (Vichy)
- (gold) France Champion – Overall – 2019 (Vichy)
- (silver) Vice France Champion – Style – 2019 (Vichy)
- (silver) Vice France Champion – Team Accuracy Landing – 2019 (Vichy)
- (bronze) 3rd of France Championship – Individual Accuracy Landing – 2017 (Vichy)
- (gold) France Champion – Style – 2016 (Vichy)
- (gold) France Champion – Overall – 2016 (Vichy)
- (gold) France Champion – Accuracy Landing – 2016 (Vichy)
- (gold) France Champion – Style – 2013 (Vichy)
- (gold) France Champion – Team Accuracy Landing – 2013 (Vichy)
- (silver) Vice France Champion – Individual Accuracy Landing – 2009 (Maubeuge)
- (silver) Vice France Champion – Team Accuracy Landing – 2008 (Metz)
- (bronze) (bronze) (bronze) 3rd of France Championship – Team Accuracy Landing – 2003 / 2004 / 2007

==== France Cup ====
- (gold) (gold) (gold) (gold) (gold) (gold) (gold) Winner of Individual France Cup
- (gold) (gold) (gold) (gold) (gold) (gold) (gold) Winner of Team France Cup
- (silver) (silver) (silver) (silver) (silver) (silver) 2nd Individual France Cup
- (silver) 2nd Team France Cup
- (bronze) (bronze) (bronze) (bronze) (bronze) 3rd Individual France Cup
- (bronze) (bronze) 3rd Team France Cup

=== Junior ===
==== International ====
- (gold) European Champion – Style – 2005 (Prostějov)
- (silver) European Vice-Champion – Overall – 2005 (Prostějov)
- (bronze) 3rd of European Championship – Accuracy Landing – 2005 (Prostějov)

==== National ====
- (gold) (gold) (gold) (gold) (gold) (gold) (gold) France Champion – 2003 / 2005 / 2006 / 2007 / 2008
- (silver) (silver) (silver) (silver) (silver) (silver) France Vice-Champion – 2002 / 2003 / 2004
- (bronze) (bronze) (bronze) (bronze) (bronze) 3rd of France Championship – 2001 / 2002 / 2003 / 2005 / 2006

  > Table showing Medals per Discipline

	Accuracy Landing	Style	Overall	Team Accuracy Landing	Team Overall
World Championship	3rd place, bronze medalist(s)		1st place, gold medalist(s) 3rd place, bronze medalist(s)	2nd place, silver medalist(s) 3rd place, bronze medalist(s)	2nd place, silver medalist(s) 3rd place, bronze medalist(s)
World Cup	2nd place, silver medalist(s) 3rd place, bronze medalist(s) 1st place, gold medalist(s)			3rd place, bronze medalist(s) 1st place, gold medalist(s)	
European Championship	2nd place, silver medalist(s)		3rd place, bronze medalist(s)	2nd place, silver medalist(s)	3rd place, bronze medalist(s)
France Championship	1st place, gold medalist(s) 2nd place, silver medalist(s) 3rd place, bronze medalist(s)	1st place, gold medalist(s) 2nd place, silver medalist(s) 3rd place, bronze medalist(s)	1st place, gold medalist(s) 2nd place, silver medalist(s) 3rd place, bronze medalist(s)	1st place, gold medalist(s) 2nd place, silver medalist(s) 3rd place, bronze medalist(s)	
France Cup	1st place, gold medalist(s) 2nd place, silver medalist(s) 3rd place, bronze medalist(s)	1st place, gold medalist(s) 2nd place, silver medalist(s) 3rd place, bronze medalist(s)		1st place, gold medalist(s) 3rd place, bronze medalist(s)	
Junior	1st place, gold medalist(s) 2nd place, silver medalist(s) 3rd place, bronze medalist(s)	1st place, gold medalist(s) 2nd place, silver medalist(s) 3rd place, bronze medalist(s)	1st place, gold medalist(s) 2nd place, silver medalist(s) 3rd place, bronze medalist(s)		
