= David Sutton =

David Sutton may refer to:

- David Russell Sutton (1895–1970), Canadian politician
- David Sutton (archivist) (born 1950), British archival researcher, recipient of a Benson Medal
- Dave Sutton (footballer, born 1957), English footballer and football manager
- Dave Sutton (footballer, born 1966), English footballer
- David Sutton (writer) (born 1966), writer and editor of Fortean Times
- Sid Owen (born 1972), British actor, born David Sutton
- David Sutton (singer), singer with Triumphant Quartet
- David Sutton (American football) (born 1984), arena football wide receiver
- David Sutton, photographer of Playboy Playmates of 1957
