= Albert Sutton =

Albert Sutton may refer to:

- Albert Sutton (architect) (1867–1923), American architect
- Albert Sutton (politician) (1874–1946), Australian politician
