= William Sutton =

William Sutton may refer to:

- William Sutton (VC) (1830–1888), English recipient of the Victoria Cross
- Will Sutton (born 1991), American football player
- Will Sutton (footballer) (born 2002), English footballer
- Bill Sutton (New Zealand politician) (1944–2025), New Zealand Labour politician
- Bill Sutton (Kansas politician) (born 1967), American politician and member of the Kansas House of Representatives
- William Sutton (songwriter) (fl. 1764), English songwriter/poet, possibly from Stockton
- William Sutton (hotelier) (1752–1840), English hotelier
- Bill Sutton (artist) (1917–2000), New Zealand artist
- Willie Sutton (1901–1980), bank robber
- William Richard Sutton (1833–1900), founder of Sutton Carriers and philanthropist founder of Sutton Housing Trusts
- William Sutton, co-founder of the Rover car company
- William Sutton, footballer who played for Everton F.C. in the 1894/95 season
- William Sutton (lawyer) (c. 1410–1480), Irish judge
- William S. Sutton (1870–1937), Canadian politician in New Brunswick
- William John Sutton (1859–1914), timberman, pioneer and promoter of Vancouver Island, British Columbia
