= Matt Sutton =

Matt Sutton may refer to:

- Matt Sutton (basketball) (born 1984), Australian basketball coach and player
- Matt Sutton (soccer) (born 2000), Australian soccer player
