= Sutton Symes =

Sutton Symes, D.D. (27 November 1679 – 18 November 1751) was Dean of Achonry from 1733 until his death.

Handcock was born in County Wexford and educated at Trinity College, Dublin. His wife died on 20 July 1747.
