= Brian Sutton =

Brian Sutton is the name of:

- Brian Charles Sutton (born 1938), British mycologist
- Bryan Sutton (born 1973), American acoustic guitarist
- Brian Sutton-Smith (1924–2015), New Zealand play theorist
