= Mickey Sutton =

Mickey Sutton may refer to:

- Mickey Sutton (cornerback) (born 1960), played in the Canadian Football League, the United States Football League, and the National Football League
- Mickey Sutton (safety) (born 1943), played in the American Football League for the Houston Oilers

== See also ==
- Michael Sutton (disambiguation)
