= Rachel Sutton =

Rachel Sutton may refer to:

- Rachel Sutton, character in Bitten (TV series)
- Rachel Sutton, presenter on Classic Hits FM
