= Thomas Sutton (disambiguation) =

Thomas Sutton (1532–1611) was a British civil servant and businessman and founder of Charterhouse School.

Thomas Sutton may also refer to:

- Thomas of Sutton (died after 1315), English Dominican theologian
- Thomas Sutton (died 1571), English MP for Derby (UK Parliament constituency)
- Thomas Sutton (pirate) (1699–1722), pirate captain in the fleet of Bartholomew Roberts
- Sir Thomas Sutton, 1st Baronet of Moulsey (1755–1813), MP for Surrey who resided at Molesey in Surrey
- Thomas Sutton (photographer) (1819–1875), inventor of the single-lens reflex camera in 1861
- Thomas Sutton (physician) (1767–1835), English medical doctor
- Thomas Sutton (Jamaican politician) (died 1710), speaker of the House of Assembly of Jamaica
- Tom Sutton (1937–2002), American comic book artist
