= West Park, West Bridgford =

Cricket ground in West Bridgford, Nottinghamshire, England

Coordinates: 52.92739°N 1.13986°W

West Park
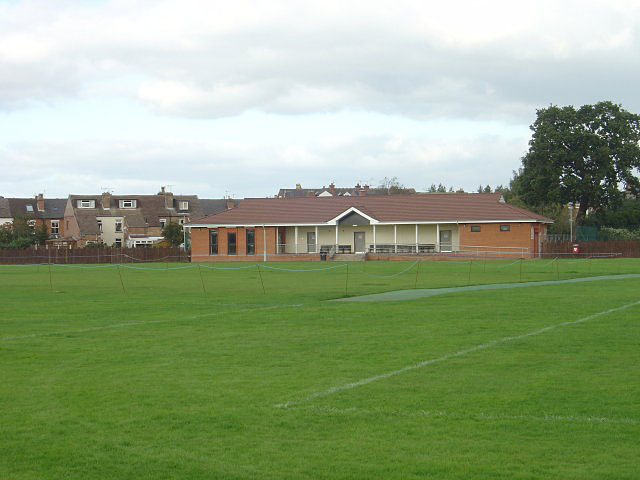
- Interactive map of West Park

Ground information
- Location: West Bridgford, Nottinghamshire
- Country: England
- Establishment: 1928 (first recorded match)

Team information
Sir J Cahn's XI	(1932 & 1935)
- As of 30 August 2010; Source: Ground profile

West Park is a cricket ground in West Bridgford, Nottinghamshire. The ground was constructed by cricket philanthropist Sir Julien Cahn. The first recorded match on the ground was in 1928, when Sir J Cahn's XI played the touring West Indies in a non first-class match. In 1932 the ground held its first first-class match when Sir J Cahn's XI played the touring South Americans. The ground held two further first-class matches, both of which came in 1935 when Sir J Cahn's XI played Leicestershire and Lancashire. Sir J Cahn's XI last played at the ground in 1941 when they took on a British Empire XI.

Still in use, the ground is owned by Rushcliffe Borough Council.
