= Nick Sutton =

- Born: Nicolas Sutton
- Occupation: Journalist
- Years active: 1996-Present

Nicolas Sutton is a British journalist, who worked for the BBC from 1996 to 2019, and Sky News since 2020.

== Career ==
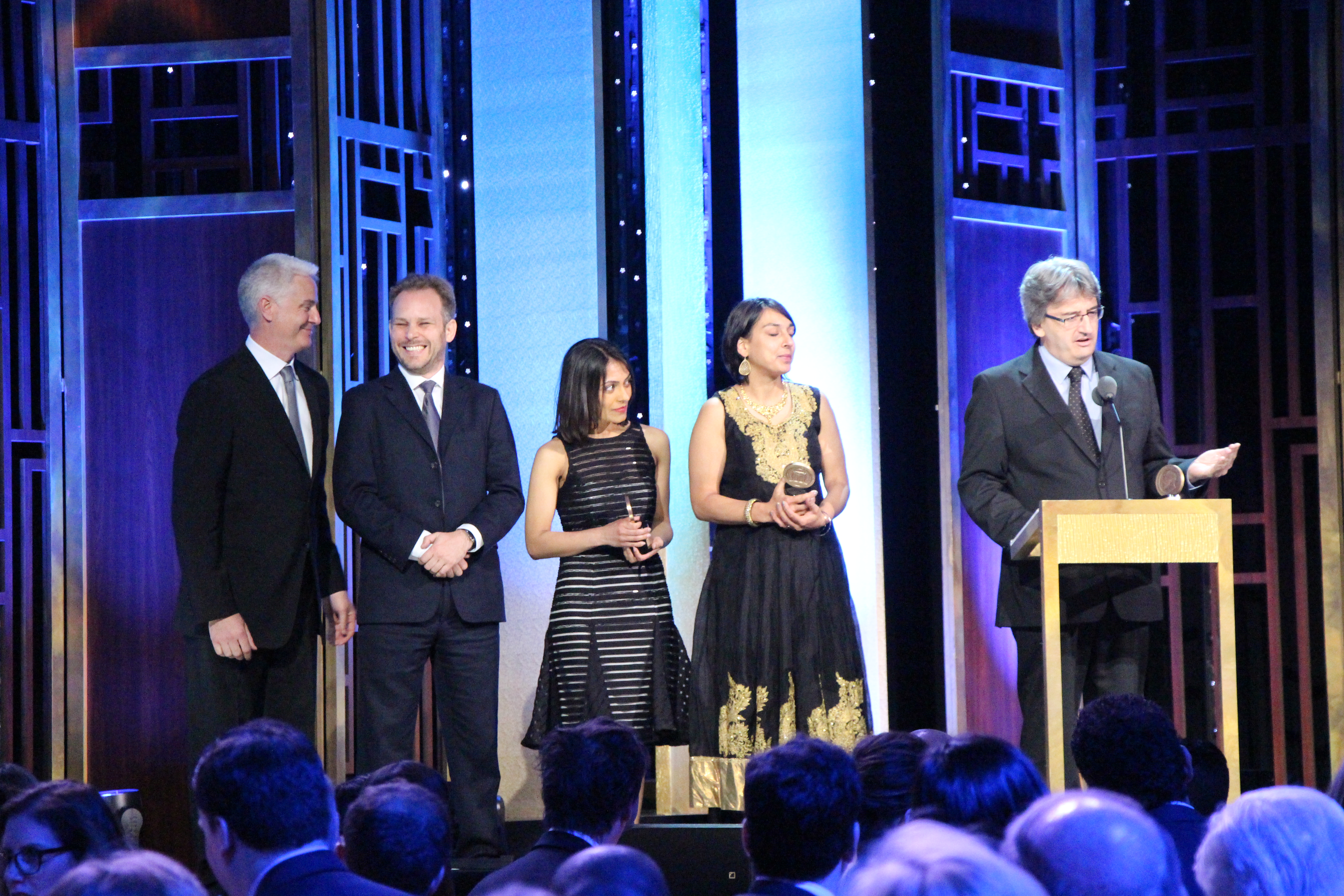
Nick Sutton (second from left) with the BBC Crew at the 75th Annual Peabody Awards for BBC's European Migrant Crisis

Sutton worked for the BBC from 1996 to 2019, where he held stints as editor of The World at One, output editor of Newsnight, the Today programme, and the BBC News at Ten, as well as Executive News Editor (Digital)

He left the BBC in 2019 to work for Sky News, where he took on the role of Head of Digital Output, he began work there in 2020. He has been praised for his extensive work in modernising its output by embracing the role of social media in news.

In August 2024, he was promoted to Director of Platforms at Sky News, and is said to be leading the "quality, consistency and cross promotion" of Sky News content across TV, audio and online.

Sutton also created the Tomorrow's Papers Today brand in 2011, where he, as a hobby, uploaded the front and back pages of major newspapers on Twitter every night. Several newspapers including the International New York Times, the Metro, and the Scotsman contacted him to help his project.

He was ranked 47th in the Sunday Times Magazine 'Top 50 People you should follow on Twitter' in 2013, ahead of Yoko Ono and Donald Trump.

He had to give up the project in 2017, but fellow BBC journalist Neil Henderson continues to tweet nightly.
