= Steve Sutton (skydiver) =

Canadian skydiver (born 1946)

Medal record

Representing Canada

Men's Parachuting

World Championships
Silver medal – second place	1972 USA	Individual Accuracy

Steve Sutton was a Canadian skydiver who began the sport in 1965 at the age of nineteen. He was born on May 29, 1946, and died on May 27, 2020.

On July 3, 1969, Sutton set a then-world record by making 200 jumps in a 24-hour period.

He was a member of Canada's National Parachute Team from 1970 to 1972, competing in two World Championships, and winning the Silver Medal in Men's Individual Accuracy at the XI World Parachuting Championships in the United States in 1972.

As part of his skydiving career, Sutton also researched improvements in parachute design in the 1970s. These endeavors led Sutton to design the FlowForm kite, a kite based roughly on the idea of the ram air parachute but also self-regulating and adapting to significant changes in wind conditions. He was married to Kathy Sutton, herself a Gold Medalist in Women's Individual Accuracy at the XV World Parachuting Championships in Bulgaria in 1980.
