= Robert Sutton =

Robert Sutton may refer to:

== Politicians ==
- Robert Sutton (died 1414), MP for Lincoln
- Robert Sutton (MP for Derby), see Derby
- Robert Dudley alias Sutton (died 1539), MP
- Robert Sutton, 1st Baron Lexinton (1594–1668), member of parliament for Nottinghamshire in 1625 and again in 1640
- Robert Sutton, 2nd Baron Lexinton (1662–1723), English diplomat
- Robert Sutton (diplomat) (1671–1746), diplomat and politician, great-nephew of the 1st Baron Lexinton

== Sports ==
- Robert Sutton (sailor) (1911–1977), American sailor who competed in the 1932 Summer Olympics
- Bob Sutton (American football) (born 1951), American football coach
- Robert Sutton (cricketer, born 1940), New Zealand cricketer
- Robert Sutton (cricketer, born 1813) (1813–1885), English cricketer

== Religion ==
- Robert Sutton (archdeacon of Lewes) (1832–1910), Anglican priest
- Robert Sutton (martyr) (died 1587), English Roman Catholic priest
- Robert Sutton (d. 1588), martyr
- Robert Sutton (priest, died 1528), Irish priest

== Others ==
- Robert Sutton (Irish judge) (died 1430), Irish judge and Crown official
- Robert I. Sutton (born 1954), professor of management science and engineering in the Stanford Engineering School
