= Laura Sutton =

Laura Sutton may refer to:

- Laura Sutton, character in Homeland (TV series)
- Laura Sutton, character in Adventures of a Private Eye
- Laura Sutton, character in Riverboat (TV series)
