= Philip Sutton =

Philip Sutton may refer to:

- Philip Sutton (badminton) (born 1960), Welsh badminton player
- Philip Sutton (artist) (born 1928), British artist
- Philip R. N. Sutton (1915–1995), Australian dental researcher
