= Richard Sutton (footballer) =

English footballer

Personal information
- Full name: Richard Melvyn Sutton
- Date of birth: 21 August 1965 (age 61)
- Place of birth: Gravesend, England
- Position: Central defender

Senior career*
Years	Team	Apps	(Gls)
1982–1983	Peterborough United	1	(0)
1983–1984	Norwich City	0	(0)
1984–1985	Dagenham	11	(0)
- * Club domestic league appearances and goals

Richard Melvyn Sutton (born 21 August 1965 in Gravesend, Kent) is an English former professional footballer who played in the Football League, as a central defender.
