= Claire Sutton (QVC presenter) =

British television presenter (born 1967)

Claire Joanna Sutton (born 25 March 1967 in Leicester, Leicestershire) is a British television presenter. She is a former dancer, actress and model, known for her role as home shopping host on the shopping channel QVC UK, which she left in 2020.

== Career ==
Sutton studied dance and drama, and has since starred in various commercials and plays. In 1990, she was the hostess for the BBC One game show Takeover Bid alongside Bruce Forsyth. She was also a member of the cheer leading band G-Force, with whom she performed on the Gladiators TV show on ITV in the mid-1990s cheering on the participants. In 1998, she became a full-time TV presenter on the QVC shopping channel, where she was reputed for her bubbly personality. In July 2020, she decided to leave QVC UK and became a full-time funeral celebrant.

== Personal life ==
Sutton is the youngest of three children. Her father died when she was 13. She married landscape gardener Daniel Sage in 1999, four years after they met at a taping of Gladiators in which he was attending as a spectator. They have three children.
