= Anthony Sutton =

Anthony Sutton may refer to:

- Antony C. Sutton (1925–2002), British-born economist, historian and writer
- Tony Sutton (born 1967), current chairman of the Republican Party of Minnesota
