= Michael H. Sutton =

American businessman

Michael H. Sutton is a director of Krispy Kreme Corporation. Sutton was the Chief Accountant of the U.S. Securities and Exchange Commission (SEC) from 1995 to 1998, and a director of American International Group from 2005 to 2009.

== Career ==
Sutton was the lead client services partner for Haskins & Sells' General Motors engagement in 1984. Before his transfer to the Detroit office, Sutton was at the firm's Executive Office in New York as Partner in Charge of Accounting Research group. After ten years with Haskins & Sells (now Deloitte & Touche), Sutton became a senior partner in the firm. He continued serving audit clients as Engagement Partner and appointed Accounting and Auditing Coordinator for the Atlanta Office.

In 1989, Sutton served on the transition team for combining the accounting and auditing professional activities of Deloitte Haskings & Sells and Touche Ross & Co. Following the merger, he became the National Director of the Accounting and Auditing Professional Practice for the firm.

While at the SEC in the mid-1990s Sutton served as the principal advisor to the commission on Accounting and Auditing Matters with responsibility for formulating commission policy on Financial Accounting and Reporting by public companies. Sutton developed the Commission's program for participating in and monitoring the development of international accounting standards. He participated in the related activities of the International Organization of Securities Commissions and served as an IOSCO Observer to the International Accounting Standards Committee. In 1997, he prepared the Commission's report to Congress on progress in harmonizing accounting standards for use in cross-border filings.

In 1997 he announced his intention to retire from the SEC. After retiring from his position as the SEC Chief Accountant in 1998, Sutton became a special, full-time consultant to the Financial Accounting Standards Board.

Sutton became an independent consultant in April 1999 and served as a senior advisor to Deloitte Touche Tohmastsu and Deloitte & Touche USA on accounting and capital market regulation and related professional issues.

Sutton was elected to the Board of Directors of Allegheny Energy, Inc. in 2004 and stayed with the company until 2011.

From 2005 to 2009, Sutton served on the Board of Directors of American International Group, Inc. He chose not to stand for re-election in 2009 and resigned from the audit committee as AIG came under public and regulatory scrutiny.

He has been director of Krispy Kreme Doughnuts since October 2004, where he also serves as Co-Chair of a Special Committee to conduct an independent investigation and is a member of the Audit Committee.

== Other affiliations ==
Sutton has also served as a special, full-time consultant to the Financial Accounting Standards Board. He earned his BS and MS degrees in accounting from the University of Tennessee.
