= Allan Sutton =

English Member of Parliament for Leicester in 1347

Allan Sutton was an English Member of Parliament (MP).

He was a Member of the Parliament of England for Leicester in 1347.
