= Accuracy landing =

Skydiving discipline

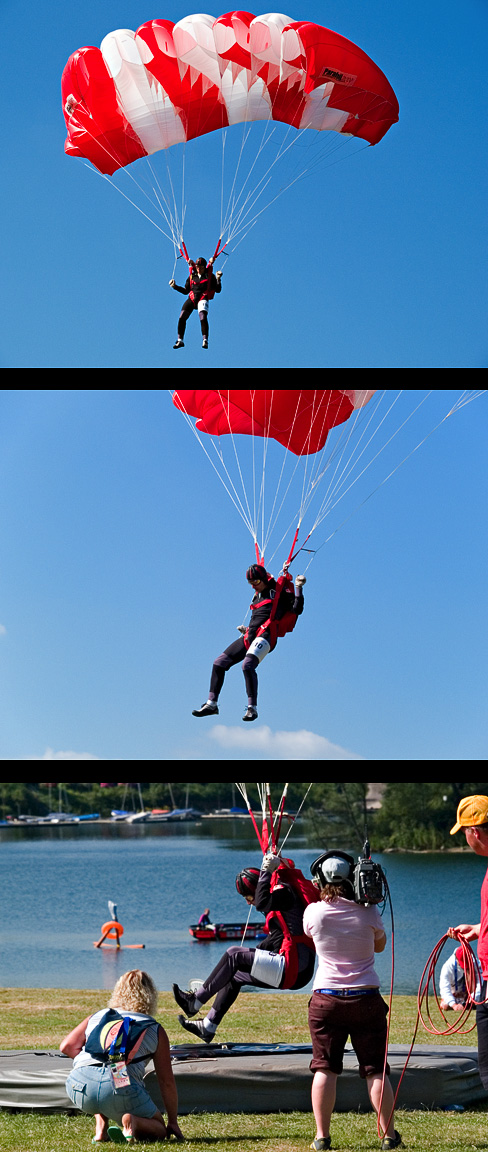
Accuracy landing (sequence) World Games 2005, Duisburg/Germany

Accuracy landing is one of the oldest skydiving disciplines, in which skydivers attempt to land as closely as possible to a predetermined target.

== Competitive accuracy landing ==
Competitive accuracy landing is a team event with 5 persons on each team that takes place over 8 rounds. The team jumps together, generally from an altitude of 900 meters (3,000 feet), although sometimes as high as 1,100 meters (3,600 feet). The score is measured in meters from "dead center". The best score for each round is 0,00 meters (meaning hitting dead center) and the worst score for a round is 0.16 meter (16 centimeters or 6 inches). Scores for each round are added together, and the scores count both as individual scores and as part of the team score. In some competitions only the four best scores count in the team competition.

== The target ==
The target, known as "dead center" is a circle with a diameter of 2 centimeters (a little less than an inch). The disk measures the distance from the edge of the dead center circle to the point the disc is touched, in increments of 1 centimeter (0,01 meters). The accompanying picture shows the electronic disk with the yellow dead center.

Note on dead center size: The 2 cm dead center has been in use from 2007. Previously the dead center was 3 cm and before that 5 cm, and before that 10 cm. The reason for reducing the size of the dead center is to have more separation between the top competitors. If two or more competitors have the same score they do re-jumps until a winner is found. Smaller dead center makes it more difficult and less likely to have many with the same score.

== Technique ==
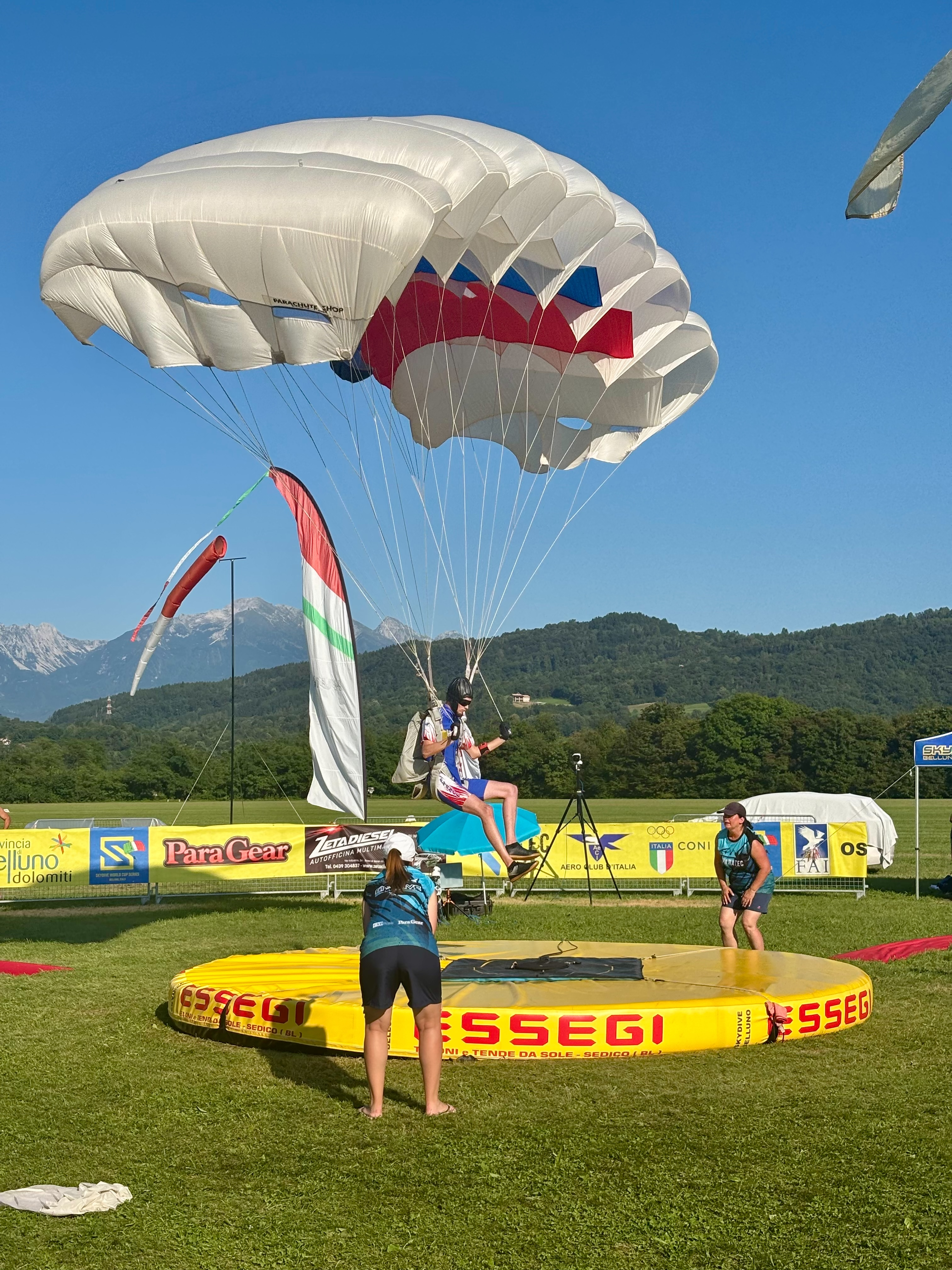

Because jumpers usually land on their feet, most try to touch the dead center mark with the heel of their shoe. After the first 8 rounds are completed, the team competition ends and winners are declared. Based on the individual results, the best half of the skydivers do one individual semifinal jump where the score is added to the individual score. Based on this score the best half of the remaining skydivers make it to the last and final round. If the 3 first places are shared between skydivers with the same score, there are re-jumps to "sudden death". This means that different scores separate the skydiver for each of the first 3 places. In some competitions the organizers choose to use the skydiver with the most dead centers as the better skydiver.

The picture at right shows the final second before landing. The heel is poised over the dead center ensuring this will be the first place the skydiver touches the ground.

== World record ==
The world record has been broken in 2013 by a member of the French Parachuting Team, Thomas Jeannerot. It was during the 4th Dubai International Parachuting Championship at Skydive Dubaï. The new record is now 2 cm in 10 cumulated jumps. It has been validated by the FAI (World Air Sports Federation) in the beginning of 2014.
