= Charles Sutton (cricketer, born 1891) =

English cricketer and British Army officer

Personal information
- Full name: Charles Lexington Manners Sutton
- Born: 26 April 1891; Chichester, Sussex, England
- Died: 8 October 1962 (aged 71); Tunbridge Wells, Kent, England
- Batting: Unknown
- Bowling: Unknown

Career statistics
Competition	First-class
Matches	5
Runs scored	90
Batting average	30.00
100s/50s	–/–
Top score	30*
Balls bowled	702
Wickets	10
Bowling average	39.60
5 wickets in innings	–
10 wickets in match	–
Best bowling	3/15
Catches/stumpings	4/–
- Source: Cricinfo, 16 May 2019

Charles Lexington Manners Sutton MBE (26 April 1891 – 8 October 1962) was an English first-class cricketer and British Army officer. Sutton served in the British Army as a commissioned officer from 1911–1931, serving mostly with the Royal Fusiliers. During this period he served in the First World War and played first-class cricket for the British Army cricket team. He was later made an MBE.

== Life and military career ==
Sutton was born at Chichester to the Reverend Charles Nassau Sutton (a great-grandson of Sir Richard Sutton, 1st Baronet) and his wife, Edith Mary Cafe. He was educated at Eton College, from where he chose a career in the British Army. Having served as a non-commissioned officer in the Territorial Force, Sutton passed the Competitive Examination of Officers in October 1911, upon which he was commissioned into the Royal Sussex Regiment as a second lieutenant, before transferring to the Royal Fusiliers in December 1912.

He served with the Royal Fusiliers in the First World War, during which he was promoted to the temporary rank of lieutenant in March 1915, antedated to November 1914. Promotion to the rank of captain followed in March 1916, while in June 1917 he was appointed a brigade major. He married his first wife, Amabel Anne Ludlow, in September 1917. The couple had two sons. Their first child, John, died three days after he was born in July 1918. In April 1921, they had a second son, also called John.

Following the war, Sutton played first-class cricket for the British Army cricket team, debuting against the Marylebone Cricket Club at Lord's in 1920. He played four further first-class appearances for the Army, with his final match coming against Cambridge University in 1923. Playing as a bowler, he took 10 wickets at an average of 39.60, with best figures of 3 for 15. He retired from active service in March 1931, upon which he was granted the rank of brevet major. Having been divorced from his first wife, he married his second wife, Gladys Louise Gubb, in June 1932. He was made an MBE in the 1946 New Year Honours. He died at Tunbridge Wells in October 1962.
