= Michael Kelly Sutton =

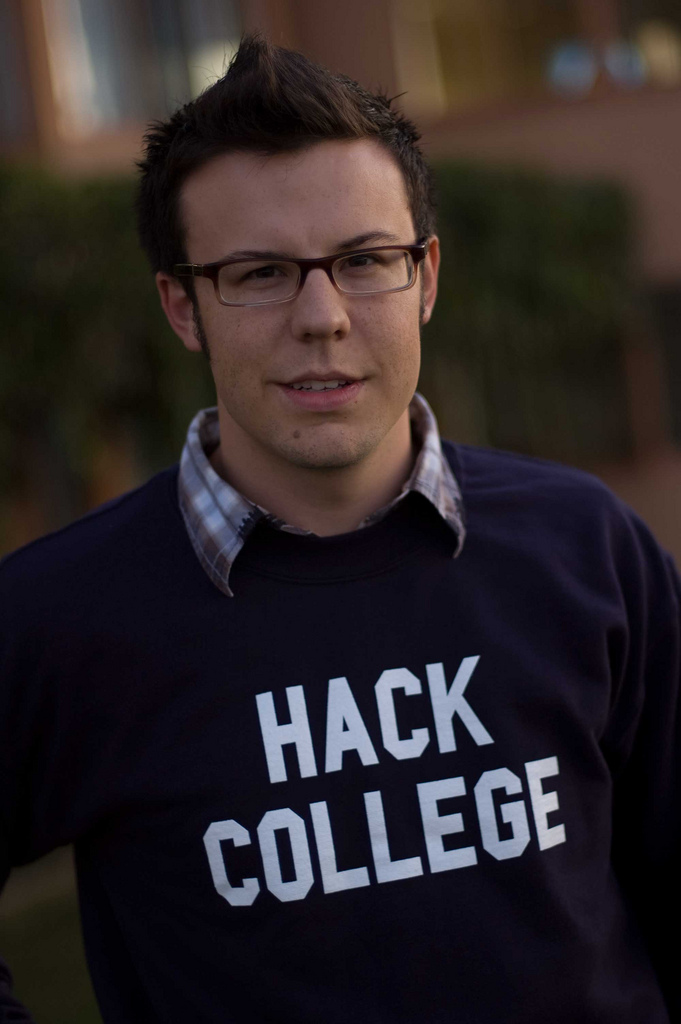
- Sutton in 2009
- Born: May 4, 1987 (age 39)
- Occupations: Software engineer, Journalist
- Known for: HackCollege, Cult of Less
- Website: michaelkellysutton.com

Michael Kelly Sutton, commonly called Kelly Sutton (born May 4, 1987), became known in 2010 for starting the websites HackCollege and Cult of Less.

== Biography ==
Sutton was raised in Everett, Washington and moved to Southern California to attend Loyola Marymount University in 2005. Sutton is currently a software engineer working for Gusto.

== Cult of Less ==
Sutton founded the website, Cult of Less as a way to "unclutter his life." The site listed all of Sutton's possessions and past belongings. He became a known figure among "digital minimalists" (people who replace physical media, such as DVDs and books, with digital media, such as streaming services). Sutton claimed in 2010 to live out of two suitcases and two boxes. On his personal website, Sutton in 2013 called the Cult of Less a "past exploit" and in 2016 noted that he had "a girlfriend and a waffle iron, so we can all agree that project is likely over."

== HackCollege ==
Sutton began the Web site HackCollege in September, 2006. Since its inception, the site has grown to include a show. The show was briefly a part of the Revision3 network.

Sutton was featured in the lifehacking documentary, You 2.0,.
