= Julia Sutton (dance historian) =

Julia Sutton (July 20, 1928 – July 1, 2012) was a musicologist and historian of early dance and music. She was professor at New England Conservatory of Music, teaching in the Music History and Musicology department, which she chaired for more than twenty years. She also taught in NEC's Performance of Early Music department, and directed the Collegium Terpsichore. Sutton was active in the founding of the Society of Dance History Scholars. She received her PhD from University of Rochester's Eastman School of Music in 1962.

Sutton was a dance enthusiast and also a teacher of living dance traditions, including American square dance, American contradance, international folk dance, and English country dance. Her scholarship explored the relationships between music and dance in Western culture. She directed and reconstructed dances for the New York Pro Musica's cross-country tours of An Entertainment for Elizabeth, the Pennsylvania Orchestra Association's Renaissance Revisited, the Ensemble for Early Music's Renaissance Revels, and a production of the great Florentine Intermedio of 1589, The Descent of Rhythm and Harmony (Cavalieri). She was a guest lecturer at many universities and colleges, and led workshops and courses of study about Renaissance dance and music.

Sutton wrote numerous articles on Renaissance music and dance for scholarly publications including The New Grove Dictionary of Music and Musicians and The International Encyclopedia of Dance. She published a new edition of the French dance manual by Thoinot Arbeau, Orchesography, and translated and edited the Italian manual by Fabritio Caroso, Nobiltà di dame. Her most recently published work was a teaching video, Il Ballarino. She was the editor-in-chief of a scholarly edition of Dances for the Sun King: André Lorin's Livre de Contredance, which was completed in 2009.

== Works ==
Articles

- "The Lute Instructions of Jean-Baptiste Besard." Musical Quarterly vol. 51, no. 2 (1965), pp. 345–362.
- "The Minuet: An Elegant Phoenix." Dance Chronicle vol. 8, no. 3-4 (1985), pp. 119–152.
- "The Music of J. B. Besard's Novus Partus, 1617." Journal of the American Musicological Society vol. 19, no. 2,(1966), pp. 182–204.
- "Reconstruction of Sixteenth Century Dances." Dance History Research (c. 1970), pp. 56–63.
- "Triple Pavans: Clues to Some Mysteries in Sixteenth-Century Dance." Early Music vol. 14 (1986), pp. 174–181.

Books

- Arbeau, Thoinot. Orchesography. (1589). Translated by Mary Stewart Evans and edited by Julia Sutton. Dover Publications, 1967. Available on Amazon.
- Caroso, Fabritio. Courtly Dance of the Renaissance: A New Translation and Edition of the Nobilta Di Dame (1600). Translated and edited by Julia Sutton. Dover Publications, 1995. Available on Amazon.
- Lorin, André. Dances for the Sun King: André Lorin's Livre De Contredanse. Available on Amazon. Edited by Julia Sutton and Rachelle Palnick Tsachor. Annapolis, MD: Colonial Music Institute, 2008.

Conference Proceedings

- "Cadential Formulae in Music and Dance in 16th-Century Italy." In Proceedings of the Twentieth Annual Conference of the Society of Dance History Scholars, pp. 299–304. Riverside, CA: Society of Dance History Scholars, 1997.
- "Musical Forms and Dance Forms in the Dance Manuals of Sixteenth-Century Italy: Plato and the Varieties of Variation." National Early Music Association, 1992. (See WorldCat listing.) Offprinted from: The Marriage of Music and Dance: Papers from a Conference. Conference held in London, 1991.
- "Triple Pavans: Clues to Some Mysteries in 16th- Century Dance." In Proceedings of the Seventh Annual Conference of the Society of Dance History Scholars, ed. Christena L. Schlundt, pp. 136–144. Towson, MD: Society of Dance Dance History Scholars, 1984.

PhD Thesis

- Jean-Baptiste Besard's Novus Partus of 1617. [Rochester] Eastman School of Music, University of Rochester, 1962.

Video and Audio Recordings

- An Evening of Renaissance Music and Dance. Boston: New England Conservatory of Music, 1972. Videocassette. 45 min. (Available in the New York Public Library Performing Arts Library's Jerome Robbins Dance Division video archive.) Dances reconstructed, directed, and staged by Julia Sutton. Instrumentation devised by Julia Sutton, Daniel Pinkham, and members of the Collegium Musicum and Collegium Terpsichore. Performers included guest dancers Marsha Davis and Charles Garth.
- "Court Dance." 1980. Film. 14 min. (Available in the New York Public Library Performing Arts Library's Jerome Robbins Dance Division video archive.) Claudio Monteverdi's ballo, Tirsi e Clori. Choreography by Julia Sutton. (9 min.). - Celeste giglio, the dedicatory dance to the entire volume of Nobiltà di dame by Fabritio Caroso. Reconstruction of the dance by Julia Sutton. (5 min.)
- Il Ballarino: The Art of Renaissance Dance. Pennington, NJ: Dance Horizons Video by Princeton Book Company, 1990. Video cassette. (Available in the New York Public Library Performing Arts Library's Jerome Robbins Dance Division video archive.) Directed by Julia Sutton and Johannes Holub. Danced by Patricia Rader and Charles Perrier, with Barbara Barr, Rebecca Perrin, Victoria Vollmer, Thomas Baird, Robert Johnson, Stephen Karver, and Hugh Murphy.
- Il Ballarino: The Art of Renaissance Dance. Pennington, NJ: Dance Horizons Video by Princeton Book Company, 2009. DVD. Available on Amazon. DVD version of 1990 video cassette.
- "Lovers and Warriors: Dance and Music of the Courts of the Medici, Gonzagas, and Farnese: April 11, 1984, 8:00 and 9:15 p.m." Audio cassette. (No known copies, but details on WorldCat.) Performers: Collegium Terpsichore, Julia Sutton, director; Collegium Renaissance Band, John Tyson, director; Collegium Vocal Ensemble, Richard Conrad, director.
- "The World of Fabritio Caroso, Italian Dancing master: April 23, 1986, 8:00 and 9:15 p.m." Audio cassette. (No known copies, but details on WorldCat.) Performers: Collegium Terpsichore, Julia Sutton, director; Collegium Musicum, Margaret Pash, director.

For access to Julia Sutton's works, see Julia Sutton's WorldCat entry.

== Encomium ==
- "In an era in which few American music schools were committed to early music, Julia was a pioneer in bringing together scholars and performers."
