= History of the Canadian National Exhibition =

History of Canadian annual fair

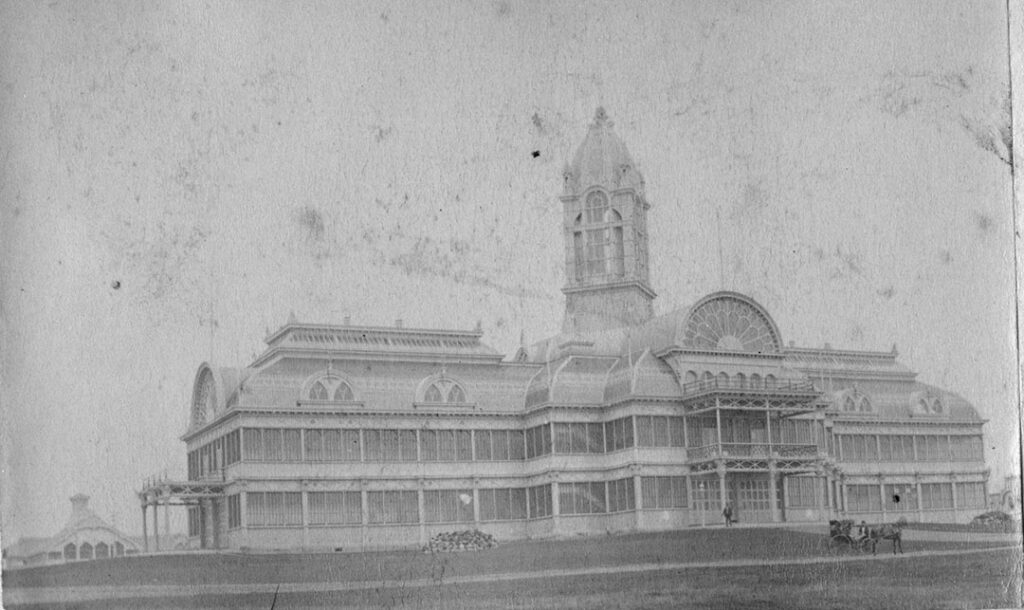
Main Building (Crystal Palace) in 1878

The Canadian National Exhibition is an annual fair held at the end of August in Toronto, Ontario, Canada. It was established in 1879 as a modest agricultural and industrial exhibition and has expanded to an annual fair that attracts over one and a half million persons during its two-and-a-half week run.

The fair has been held annually from 1879 on the same Exhibition Place site on Lake Ontario, except during World War II, when the fairgrounds were given up to the Canadian military, and a two-year hiatus due to the COVID-19 pandemic. The fair provides entertainment, a midway, shopping, two parades, an air show, agricultural displays and numerous food vendors for visitors.

== Beginnings ==
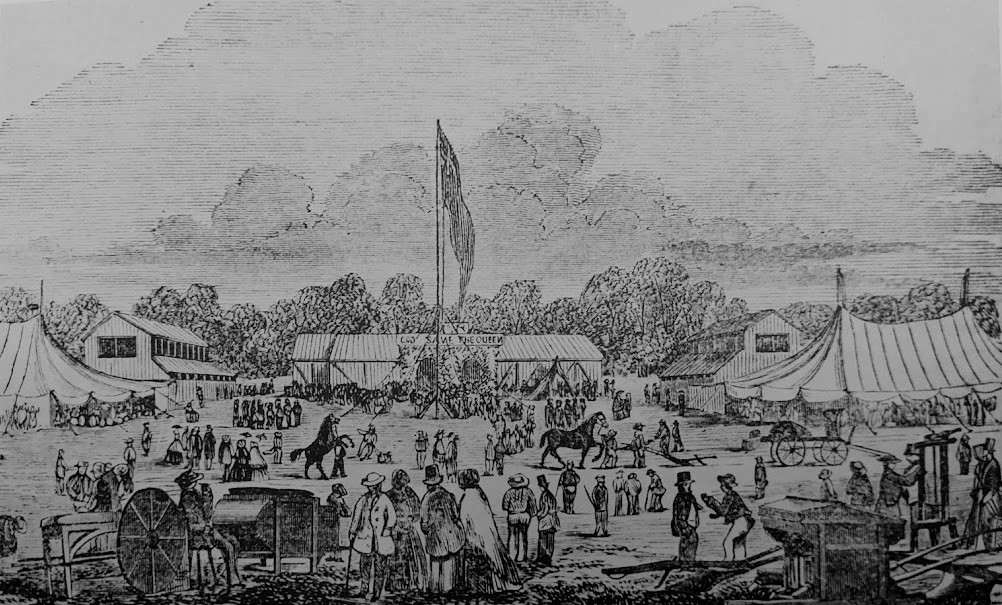
View of 1852 Canada West Agricultural fair in Toronto

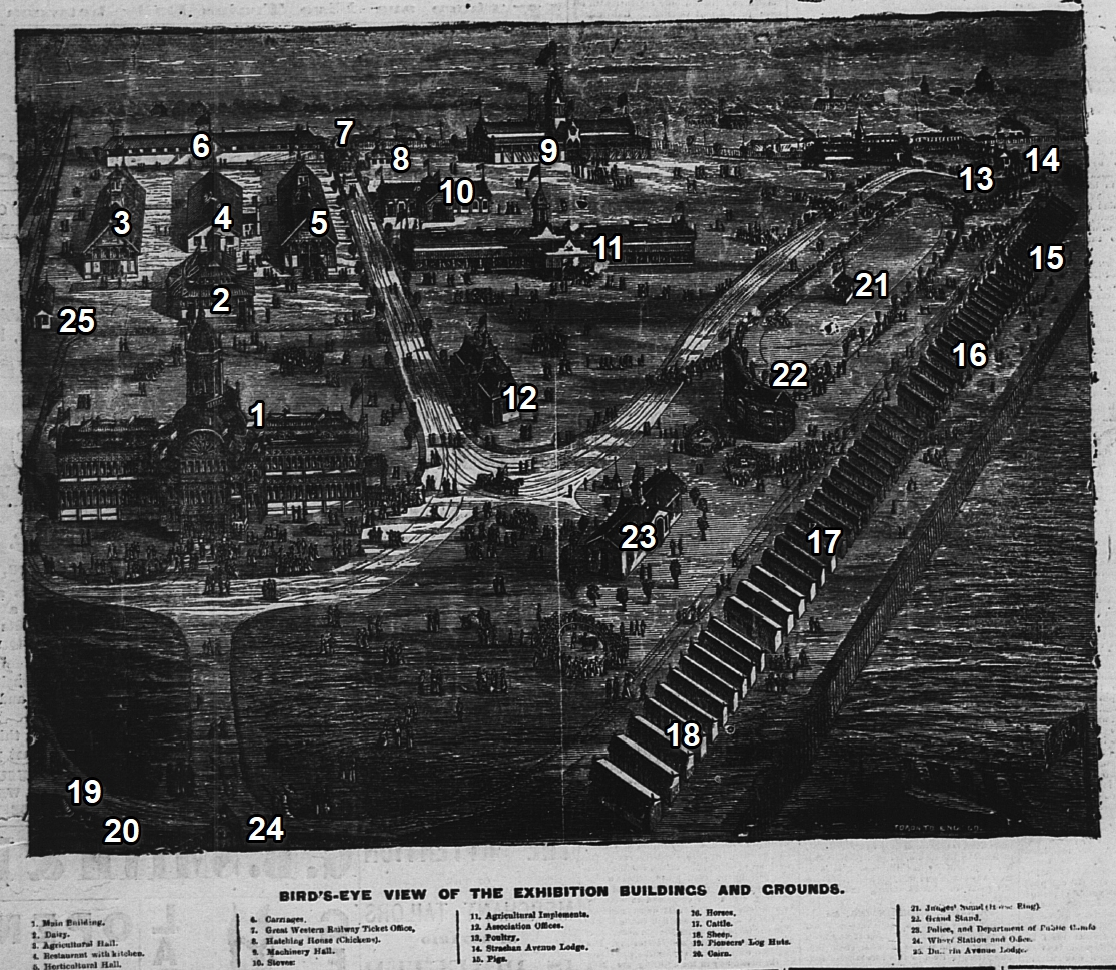
Map of Toronto Industrial Exhibition 1879 and Buildings

In September 1846, the Provincial Agricultural Fair of Canada West, sponsored by the Provincial Agricultural Association and the Board of Agriculture for Canada West, was held in Toronto in the area near present-day King and Simcoe Streets. While primarily an agricultural event, it also displayed manufactured goods and decorative arts and crafts. The fair was a success, and it was proposed that future fairs be held in different locations each year. In 1847, the fair was held in Hamilton and thereafter travelled to such cities as Cobourg, Kingston, Niagara, and Brockville.

In 1852, the fair returned to the west side of University Avenue in the Grange Park area, stretching from a bit north of Dundas Street to a bit south of College Street. It lasted four days. The Horse Park, on the west side of the grounds, was loaned to the fair by Mrs. Boulton, who lived in the Grange, and it was bounded on the north by the Caer Howell Pleasure Grounds (in a way a forerunner of the midway). The fair was a success, attracting more than 30,000 visitors. After the 1852 fair, the Board of the Association passed the resolution to the Government to support municipalities who would construct permanent structures for the fair. The City of Toronto received 20 acres (8.1 ha) of Military Reserve lands south of the Lunatic Asylum, west of the city, on King Street West and constructed the CA$5,000 (equivalent to $96,096 in 2025) 'Palace of Industry', nicknamed the 'Crystal Palace', its walls were cast iron and glass (this being prior to electric lighting), in time for the next time the event was held in Toronto, in 1858.

After the 1877 fair held in London, Ontario, the City of Toronto won the right to hold the fair in 1878. The current site on King Street was considered unsuitable and City Council promised new facilities. The City arranged for a lease with the Government of Canada of 50 acres (20 ha) of the Military Reserve west of Old Fort York, at the foot of Dufferin Street for CA$100 (equivalent to $4,021 in 2025) per year. To build the facilities, the City estimated the cost at CA$450,000, which was put to a vote of Toronto taxpayers in May 1878. The vote failed, and plans were made to finance the new site through a CA$75,000 (equivalent to $3,015,574 in 2025) bond offering. This failed also, but the City went ahead and added the amount to its budget anyway. Beginning in July, with only three months to complete the site, preparations began on the site. The 1878 fair was held on the new site at the foot of Dufferin Street. The City moved the Crystal Palace from its site on King Street to a place on the grounds to serve as the main exhibition space. A second floor and cupola was added to the building when it was reconstructed.

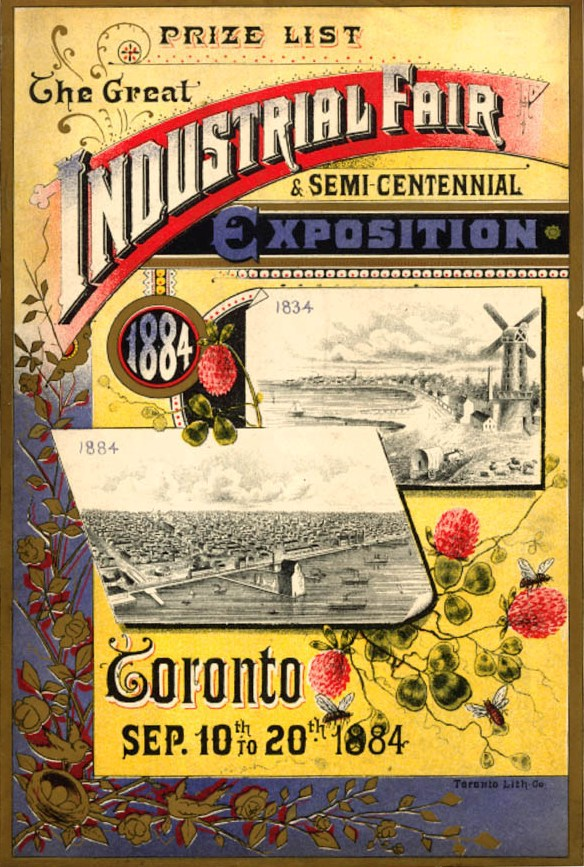
An advertisement for the 1884 Toronto Industrial Exhibition.

After the 1878 fair, Toronto City Council and the local Exhibition Committee approached the Provincial Agriculture Association with a proposition: that the fair remain permanently in Toronto. The Association thanked City Council and the Exhibition Committee for their work in delivering a successful fair in 1878 but informed them that a decision had already been made to move the fair to another city in 1879. Council, along with local businessmen, moved ahead with plans to establish a permanent fair in Toronto. The Agricultural Association refused again to hold the fair in Toronto, and instead a new permanent fair was created, the Toronto Industrial Exhibition (TIE), an incorporated entity.

The new fair opened to the public on Tuesday, September 2, 1879, and lasted for three weeks (Sundays excepted). The exhibition hosted an attendance of an estimated 100,000 paid admissions. It was officially opened by Governor General John Campbell, Marquess of Lorne and Princess Louise the following Friday, September 5, the Marquess declaring "I have much pleasure in declaring the Toronto Industrial Exhibition formally open to the public." The day was capped by a grand ball held off-site at the Pavilion at Allan Gardens. The first fair had 8,234 exhibits and CA$100,000 of buildings. The fair was staggered, showing animals in the second and third weeks only.

For that first fair, the York Pioneers Historical Society, on its own, relocated the 1794 Scadding Cabin settler's log cabin to the site. The Grandstand show was a display of prize animals. The track of the Military Reserve and its Grandstand was used for equestrian displays and several wooden structures were built for other exhibits and live stock. Attendees arrived by carriage by Dufferin Street, by boat at two wharves, by the Great Western Railway line and the street railway, which was extended to Strachan Avenue. A row of pens along the waterfront held the live stock. Sporting events included a half-mile foot race for a purse of CA$50 (equivalent to $1,897 in 2025) and a sculling race won by Jacob Gaudaur for a prize of CA$300 (equivalent to $11,381 in 2025).

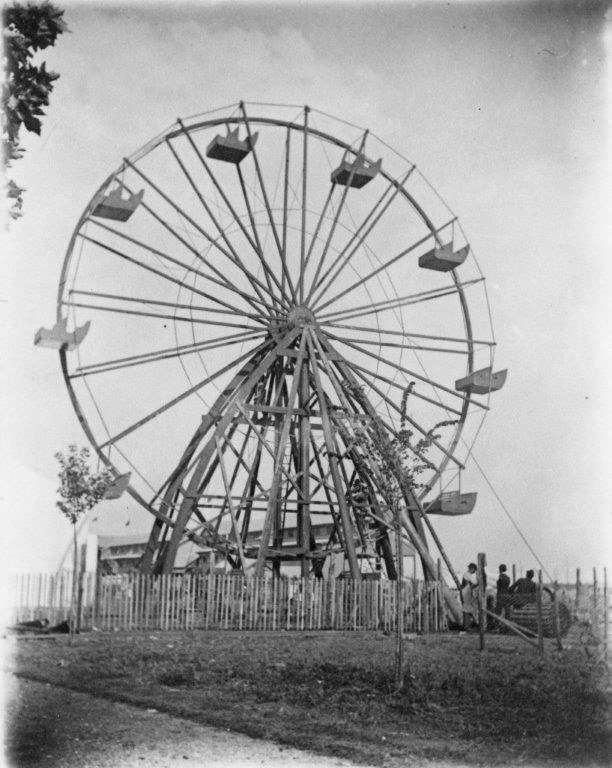
Ferris wheel at Toronto Industrial Exhibition, 1900

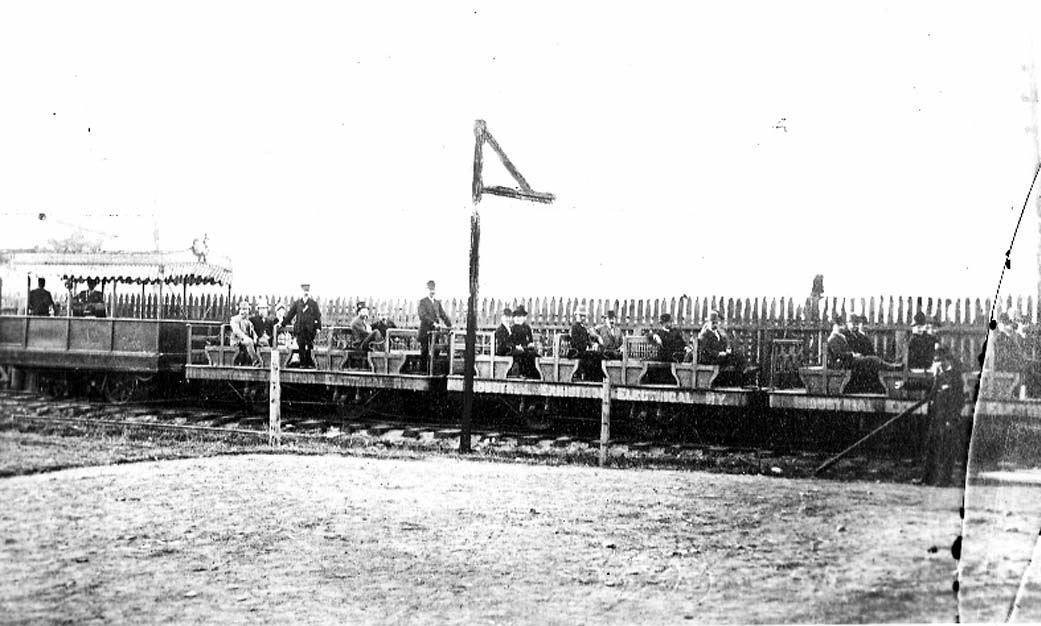
Electric railways at the CNE in 1884. The railways were introduced to the CNE the previous year.

As the fair grew, it exhibited the latest technological advances. Exhibition patrons were introduced to electric railway transportation in 1884, to "Edison's Perfected Phonograph" in 1888, to "wireless telegraphy" at the 1899 fair,. By 1883, the CNE was lit at night by an electric lighting tower just east of the Crystal Palace.

The fair grew to add attractions other than agricultural and industrial ones. In 1884, the fair added the "Little World" exhibit of miniature landscapes with about 100 figures doing "all the operations required in the carrying on of the leading industries of the day." It was extremely popular with half-hour waits in line and returned in the following two fairs. In 1885, the fair included three 'Grand Balloon Excursions' by the 'Lady Aeronaut' Carlotta. The electric railway was operated again. An 'International Fireworks Competition' was held, along with "Mr. Hirschfelder's Great Museum" of curiosities, "Professor Morley's Beautiful Fata Morgana" and the animal exhibits of Piper's Toronto Zoo. That year saw the construction of two permanent rides: a 'racing' roller coaster, and a 'Switchback' there and back coaster like the Switchback Railway at Coney Island.

The addition of entertainments led to criticism that the fair was not paying enough attention to its agricultural and industrial roots. In 1881, the editor of the Reformer that the "addition of so many features of such a novel and promiscuous character that the merely agricultural and industrial is apt to be lost sight of." According to the Labour Advocate what was an instructive show was turning into "a mere gallery of mountebanks and hawkers." And the Telegram urged that the "circus business" be done-away with. As the entertainments showed they had drawing power, the newspapers became more supportive. The Globe pointed out that the entertainment's revenue also produced better displays in other departments.

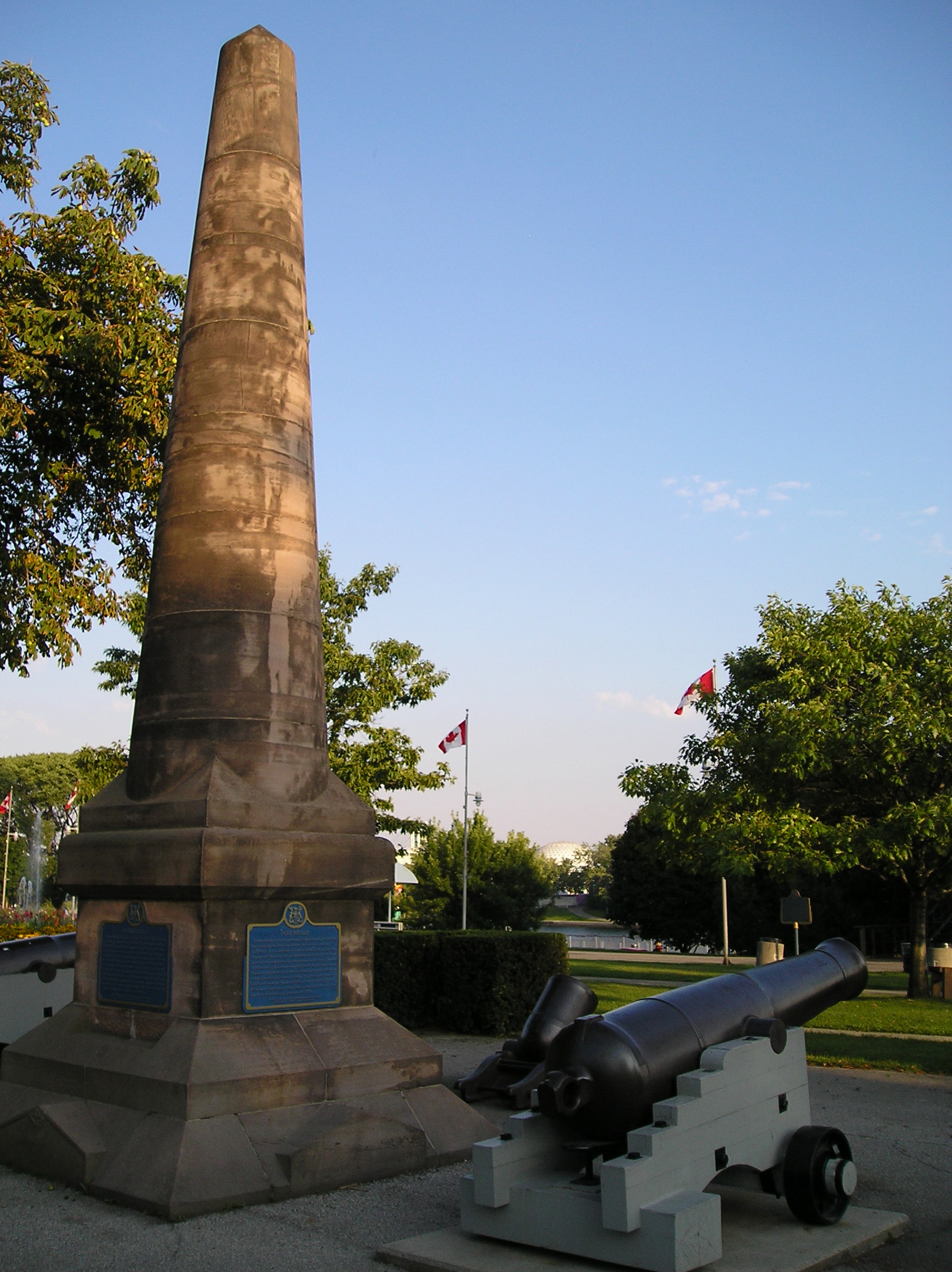
The Fort Rouillé obelisk

After several years with only a simple cairn to mark the spot, the 1887 fair saw the dedication of an obelisk on the site of old French fort Fort Rouillé at the foot of Dufferin Street. The Exhibition Association, the city, the province and the York Pioneers all contributed to its funding.

Exhibitors did realize the value of entertainment in their exhibits. The 1887 'Moxie Nerve Food' exhibit was a pyramid of bottles, 12 bottles high. The use of miniatures was common. The 1887 Polson Iron Works had a model of a Canadian Pacific steamship under construction and two years later the Canadian Pacific exhibit itself had a model of the Empress of India. The 1893 Massey farm equipments company display included a 15 ft (4.6 m) long electric model of the train they used to ship to market and was hosted by an Egyption dragoman in exotic Eastern clothing. The 1893 exhibit of the agricultural association of the North-West Territories (then including the Prairies) presented a miniature farm model with miniature humans, machinery and animals.

Retailers displayed at the Ex in the Crystal Palace from the start, although their displays were small. By 1887, the Main Building was completely full of retailers and resembled a "vast store". By the 1890s, the large department stores Eaton's and Simpson's took up large exhibit space, and Eaton's itself took over the Main Building completely in 1899.

The 1897 fair celebrated the Diamond Jubilee of Queen Victoria, taking on the name of "Victorian Era Exposition and Industrial Fair." It was opened by Lieutenant-Governor George Kirkpatrick and Lady Kirkpatrick. A highlight of the year's fair was a special exhibit of gold and silver ores from British Columbia and Lake of the Woods in the CPR Building.

The 1901 fair added the animals of Toronto's two zoos: elk from High Park, and moose, doe and fawn from the Riverdale Zoo. They were displayed in an open-air pen north of the Railways Building. The fair's opening day recorded its best attendance to date. The grandstand show had a naval and military spectacle "Bombardment of the Taku Forts" and "Destruction of the Chinese fleet" in the recent Chinese war, followed by fireworks.

In 1902, the "Midway of Marvels" was introduced. Acts and attractions included "Frank Bostock's Animal Arena" of trained wild animals, Williams and Warren's "Fairyland", Heazlits' Children's Theatre, Captain Louis Sorchos "Deep Sea Divers", Cassel's Dog and Pony Show, Stark's Glassworks, and Milton Dowker's display of Alberta cowboy life in the Northwest Territories. Other attractions included Sosman and Landis' 'electrical exhibition' "A Day at The Alps", Cora Beckwirth's Water Carnival, the "Temple of Illusion" and a moving-picture exhibit showing the eruption of Mt. Pelee among other subjects. That same year the Art Gallery building was erected. It displayed water-colour and oil paintings, fine china, and a display of art of the Technical School. The matinee performance was high-diving; the evening spectacle was "The Orient" produced by Bolossy Kiralfy, a new production of his spectacle shown in London, England. Kiralfy would return the next year to produce "A Carnival in Venice" of Italian music to a backdrop of Venice, the songs sung from gondolas and the musicians on an island.

== Canadian National Exhibition ==
In 1901, the Exhibition was opened by Prime Minister Wilfrid Laurier. In his address at the opening ceremony, Exhibition Association president Dr. Andrew Smith announced the Association's intentions to Laurier: "We aim to make this a Canadian National Exhibition, to secure exhibits from all the Provinces, to assemble in these grounds and buildings specimens of the manifold products and industries of Canada, to contribute to the unity of the Commonwealth, promote commercial, industrial, and agricultural enterprises, and establish in the Canadian people faith and pride in their own resources, opportunities and achievements."

In its twenty-fifth iteration, the 1903 fair was the first known as the Canadian National Exhibition, and it was officially opened by Lord Strathcona. It was selected as the "Dominion Exhibition" for the year. The fair displayed the Jubilee gifts received by Queen Victoria, and the "Dufferin Presents" received by the Marquess of Dufferin and Ava during his residence in Canada and India. A prominent display was a huge cake of "Comfort" Soap, that fairgoers were invited to guess the weight of, for a prize of an upright piano. 75,000 guesses were received for the 816 pound, 2.5 oz. cake of soap and the winner was Mrs. William Adams of Euclid Avenue who won a CA$350 (equivalent to $13,153 in 2025) Palmer Upright Piano. The 1903 fair organizers responded to criticisms of the side show nature of the midway, moving the midway's location to the eastern end of the grounds, away from the manufacturing and agricultural exhibits. The new midway had a decorative arch at its entrance.

In 1904, the directors promised "much-improved displays of Canadian manufacturers, live stock, machinery and produce." The art gallery displayed paintings valued at CA$200,000 (equivalent to $7,516,250 in 2025), including The Death of General Wolfe by Benjamin West, loaned by King Edward. The grand stand show was a "pyro-military spectacle entitled 'The Relief of Lucknow'", featuring pipers of The Black Watch and fireworks. Acts at the fair included "Dare-devil Schreyer" who jumped from a bicycle 108 feet (33 m) in the air to a 2 feet (61 cm)-deep tank of water below. Other acts included trained bears, trained lions, aerial acrobatics and the demonstration of a musical instrument known as the "myriaphone." The Exhibition grounds were part of the Dunlop 15 miles (24 km) bicycle road race from High Park through Toronto and back. As a special promotion, the fair offered a limited number of tickets at six for a dollar. The CNE built the Administration Building (now the Press Building) in 1905 at a cost of CA$32,000 (equivalent to $1,099,477 in 2025).

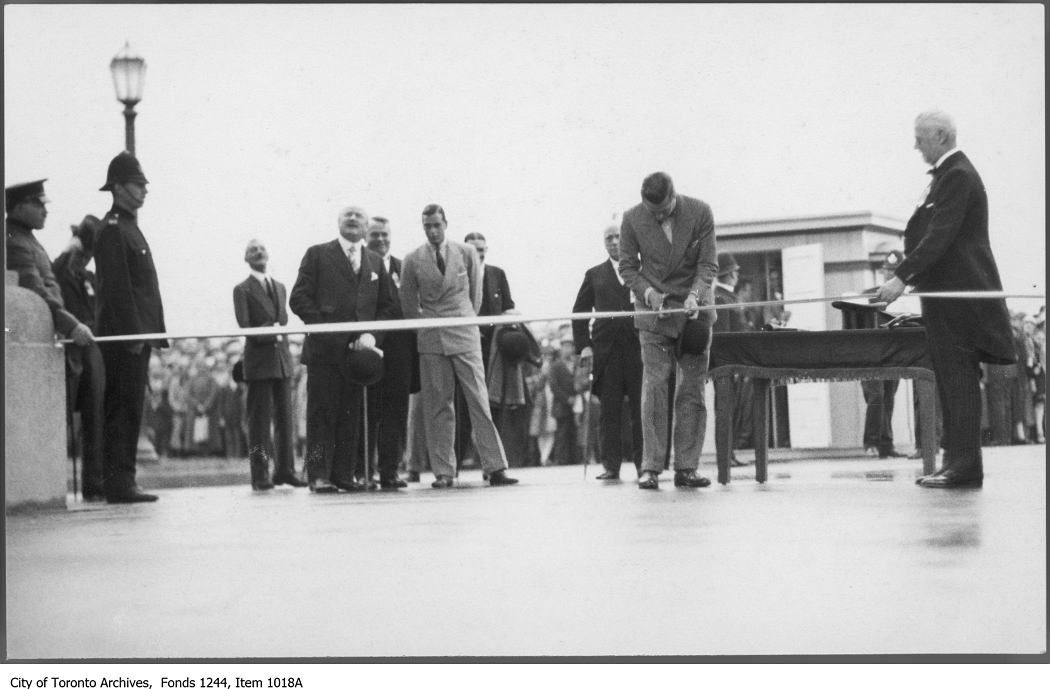
Edward, Prince of Wales cutting the ribbon to officially open Princes' Gates

In October 1906, the Crystal Palace, Grand stand and the cattle barns were destroyed in one large fire. New buildings were constructed, designed by Exhibition architect G. W. Gouinlock in the Beaux-Arts style. The Horticulture Building was built in 1907 to replace the Crystal Palace. Also that year, a new Grandstand was constructed. The Music Building was constructed as the Railways Building, designed for the Grand Trunk and Canadian Pacific Railway. The Government Building, also known as the Arts, Crafts and Hobbies Building was built in 1911. The 1912 Women's Building, another Gouinlock design along the waterfront, had lectures, concerts, fashion shows and craft and food judging.

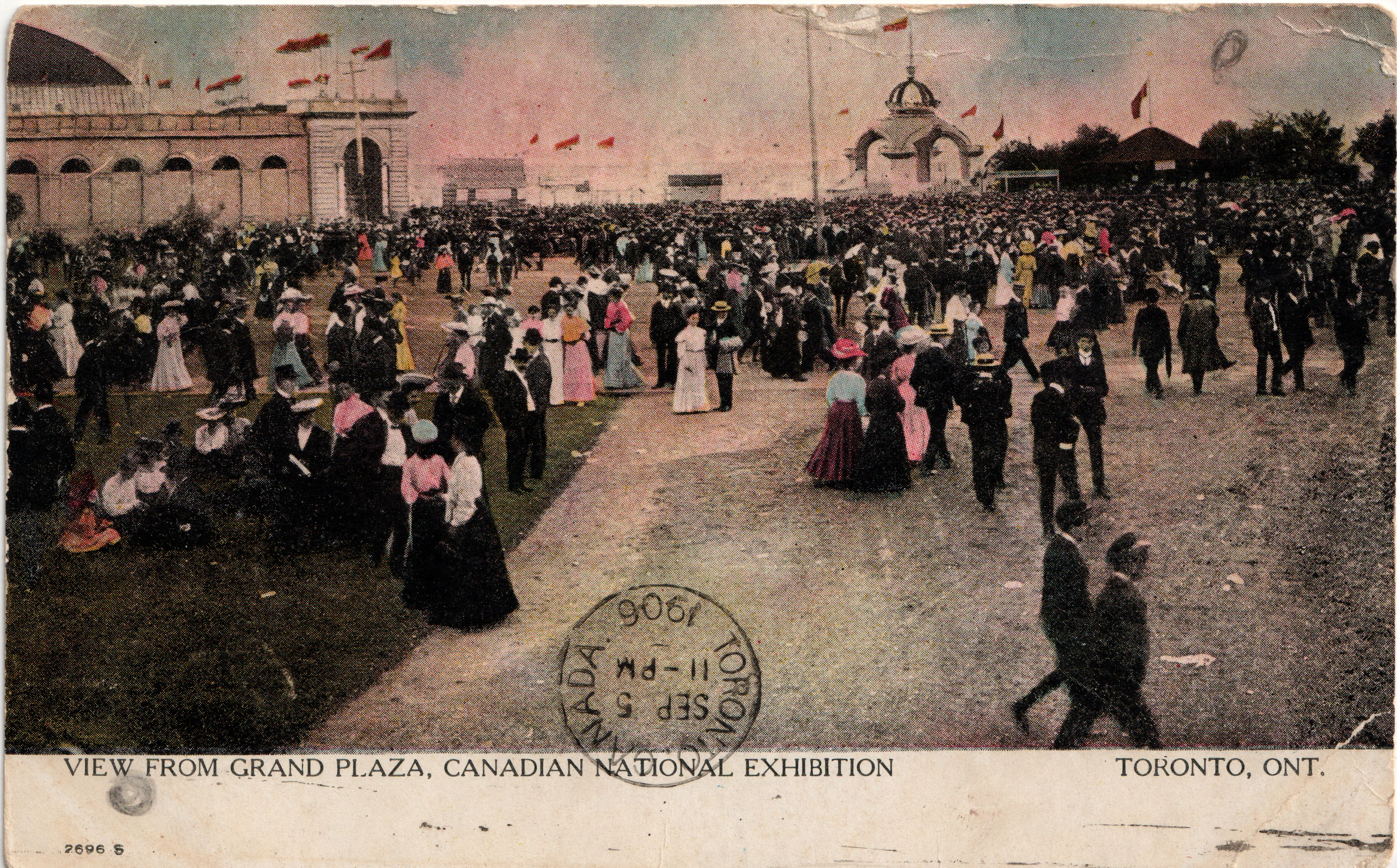
View from Grand Plaza, Canadian National Exhibition, 1906

The 1913 fair had an unusual 'sport' at the Grandstand. Players of 'motor polo' drove around, with men on the running boards with mallets hitting a ball around. The series was dangerous and one player "Blondy" was serious hurt when his car flipped over. The technological marvel displayed at the fair was the "Presto Phone" phone intercom system requiring no operators.

During World War I, the fair continued, although the fairground were used as a military "winter quarters." The theme for the 1915 fair was military, 1915 being a "Patriotic Year". Displays included weapons, war trophies returned from Europe and "blood-stained and torn clothing worn by soldiers in the trenches." In 1919, the "Victory Year", the Fine Arts Gallery displayed an exhibition of paintings depicting the fighting in Europe, while the Graphic Arts Building displayed an International Exposition by the Toronto Camera Club, and 175 paintings by Canadian painters, including Lawren Harris.

In 1921, the fair held its first Warriors' Day Parade of veterans, nurses and armed forces personnel. It was overseen by new Governor General of Canada Lord Byng. In 1927, the parade would inaugurate the new Princes' Gates, with a review of veterans by the Edward, Prince of Wales and Prince George. The Princes' Gates marked the eastern expansion of the fair grounds to Strachan Avenue. Up until that time, the main entrance was the Dufferin Gates at Dufferin Street.

The growing attendance and high take-up by exhibitors led to the approval in 1921 of two new buildings - the Pure Foods Building and the Machinery Hall, to take exhibitors from the Manufacturers' Building. The Pure Foods Building was built north of the Grandstand at a cost of CA$150,000 and opened in 1922. The Machinery Hall opened in 1923 at a cost of CA$300,000 (equivalent to $5,354,348 in 2025), with an exhibit of a complete "Trans-Canada Limited" steel train.

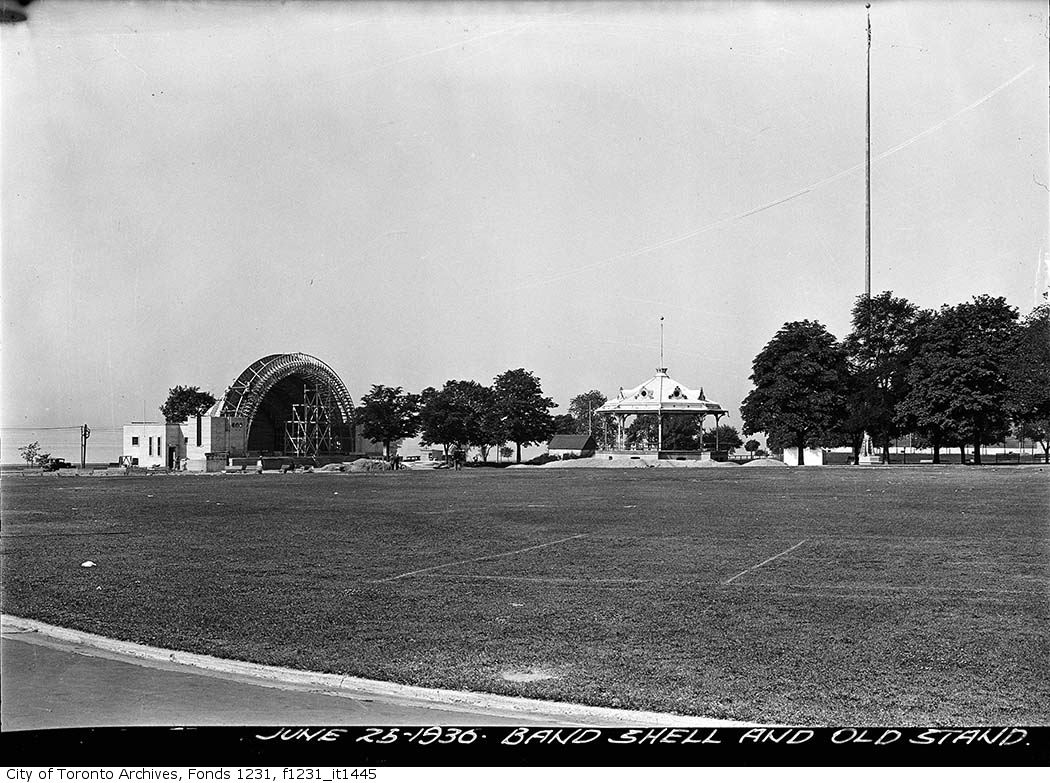
The CNE Bandshell under construction in 1936. The old bandstand is to its right

The CNE introduced swimming marathons in the 1920s. In 1927, the marathon was 21 miles (34 km) in length, had a prize purse of CA$50,000 and had over 400 participants. With so many participants, it had to be held in relays of 75 swimmers. In 1928, the 10 miles (16 km) Wrigley Marathon was held. 66 women swimmers participated for the prize of CA$15,000, won by Ethel Hertle. Swimming marathons continued until 1937.

In 1927, the CNE moved its livestock displays indoors into the new Live Stock Pavilion, northwest of the Princes' Gates. Built by the Royal Agricultural Winter Fair, it replaced wooden structures and tents that temporarily housed the animals. The new building had room for 2,000 cattle, 1,500 pigs and 1,200 sheep, plus a judging ring and veterinary space. In 1928, the fair's golden jubilee, it opened the new CA$600,000 (equivalent to $10,826,374 in 2025) Electrical and Engineering just west of the Princes' Gates.

The fair was extremely profitable for the City of Toronto. In 1927 alone, it turned over CA$215,000 (equivalent to $3,879,451 in 2025) and in the ten years previous had turned over CA$2,000,000 (equivalent to $36,087,912 in 2025) to the city's coffers.

In 1932, tragedy struck the Midway, when 19-year-old Belle Lichman would break her back in a diving act on the Midway. Lichman became paralyzed from the neck down from the injury. Lichman died four years later from influenza.

The 1934 fair celebrated the centennial of the City of Toronto with special displays at the grand plaza south of the Horticultural Building. This was the first year that the CNE held its first dog swimming races, later called the Dog Swim. The Dog Swim continued annually until 1988.

The 1935 fair was declared the best in five years by the CNE's manager. Its athletics programme included three world's championships (in the five-mile swim for women and two motorboat races) and 20 Canadian championships (in archery, men's and women's swimming, diving and weightlifting), as well as a track meet, high-diving exhibitions, canoeing races, women's softball and two harness races. The fair had daily performances by a revue led by Rudy Vallée in the ballroom (in the Automotive Building), the Grandstand spectacle 'Kodia' had over 1,200 performers and military bands. International exhibits included India, Great Britain and other dominions of the Commonwealth, and Czechoslovakia. The Indian exhibit included various animals from India, including a lion, Bengal tigers, leopards and various baby animals, which were later donated to Canada after the fair. The CNE Dog Show was considered its largest ever, including five times more dachshunds than ever before.

In 1936, the CNE introduced the CNE Bandshell, an outdoor covered concert stage south of the Horticultural Building. The Bandshell was funded with surplus funds from the 1935 fair. The Bandshell replaced a small bandstand in the park, and became a site for regular concerts. Seating is outdoors on benches. The first event was the official opening of the fair by Ontario Premier Hepburn with a concert by the Kneller Hall Band from the UK's National School of Music in Twickenham, England on August 27, 1936.

In 1937, Conklin Shows was awarded the contract to provide amusement rides and games for the CNE midway. Its successor company North American Midway Entertainment today operates the midway. Conklin was sold in 2004 for US$100 million and merged with two other carnival operators to form North American Midway Entertainment

As swing music increased in popularity, in 1938, the CNE inaugurated the Dance Tent, its interior measuring 86 feet (26 m) by 260 feet (79 m), with a wooden dance floor, even larger than the ballroom in the Automotive Building, itself claimed to have been "the largest dance floor in Canada". The Tent's first year featured the bands of Benny Goodman, Buddy Rogers, Guy Lombardo and Tommy Dorsey.

In 1939, the "Transportation and Communications Year", the CNE held its first live television demonstration. Television models had been displayed in previous years by individual retailers in static displays. The year saw the introduction of a food staple - the ice cream waffle sandwich - which continues to be sold at the Ex.

== World War 2 hiatus ==
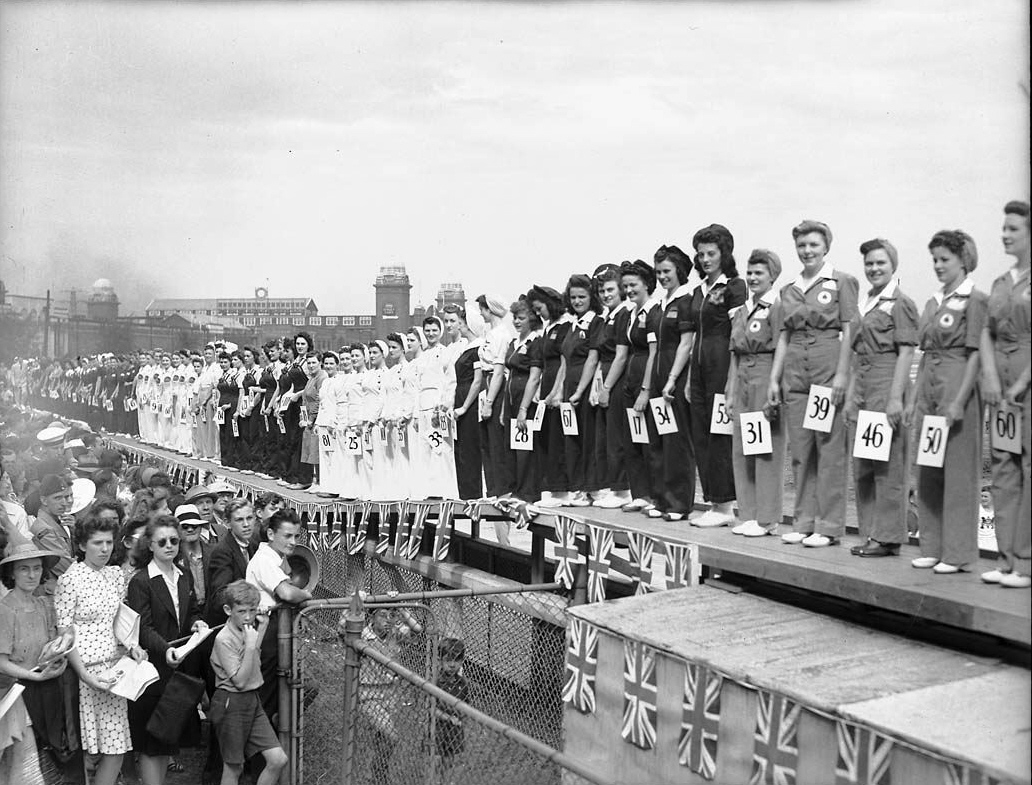
Miss War Worker Beauty Contest held at the CNE during the Second World War.

During the Second World War, as during the First World War, the CNE grounds became home to detachments of the Canadian military. In 1939, the Royal Canadian Air Force moved into the Coliseum. The Canadian Army took over the Horse Palace and the Royal Canadian Navy converted the Automotive Building into HMCS York. During the summers of 1940 and 1941, most of the troops stationed at the CNE were relocated. Those remaining troops continued their regular administrative duties or participated in CNE displays and events to promote the Canadian war effort. A recruitment office was set up during the CNE. The 1941 fair promised the "biggest two weeks of war propaganda this country has ever season." There were daily military exercises, and special exhibits by the Air Force, the Navy and the Department of Munitions. A grandstand was built south of the main Grandstand for military vehicle processions, and fairgoers, including children could ride in military vehicles. A 'Free French' exhibit was displayed, organized by Lt. Col. Pierrenne, official representative of General de Gaulle, seeking monetary donations to their cause. Over 1,200 men applied to join the Canadian army at a recruiting centre at the fair.

CNE officials had hoped to continue the annual fair throughout the years of the war. In the spring of 1942, however, the CNE agreed to turn the grounds over to the Canadian military for use year-round. During the military occupation of the grounds, virtually every CNE building, was used by the Canadian armed forces. The CNE grounds remained closed and under the control of the Canadian military until 1946. The Government of Canada paid a cash settlement to the City of CA$1.29 |million. It was estimated that the site had housed and trained 300,000 during its use by the military. Between 1945 and 1946, Exhibition Park was a demobilization centre for returning troops at the end of the war before closing on June 1, 1946.

Fairgoers who appreciated the rides of the midway could go to Riverdale Park in the summers of 1942 and 1943, where Conklin Shows put on a 'Fair for Britain'.

While the CNE was closed, the 1912 Grandstand (the third on the site) suffered a serious fire on April 14, 1946. The city had been using it for storage and the various supplies and electrical equipment were lost. What remained was demolished and no part was reusable.

== Post-war ==
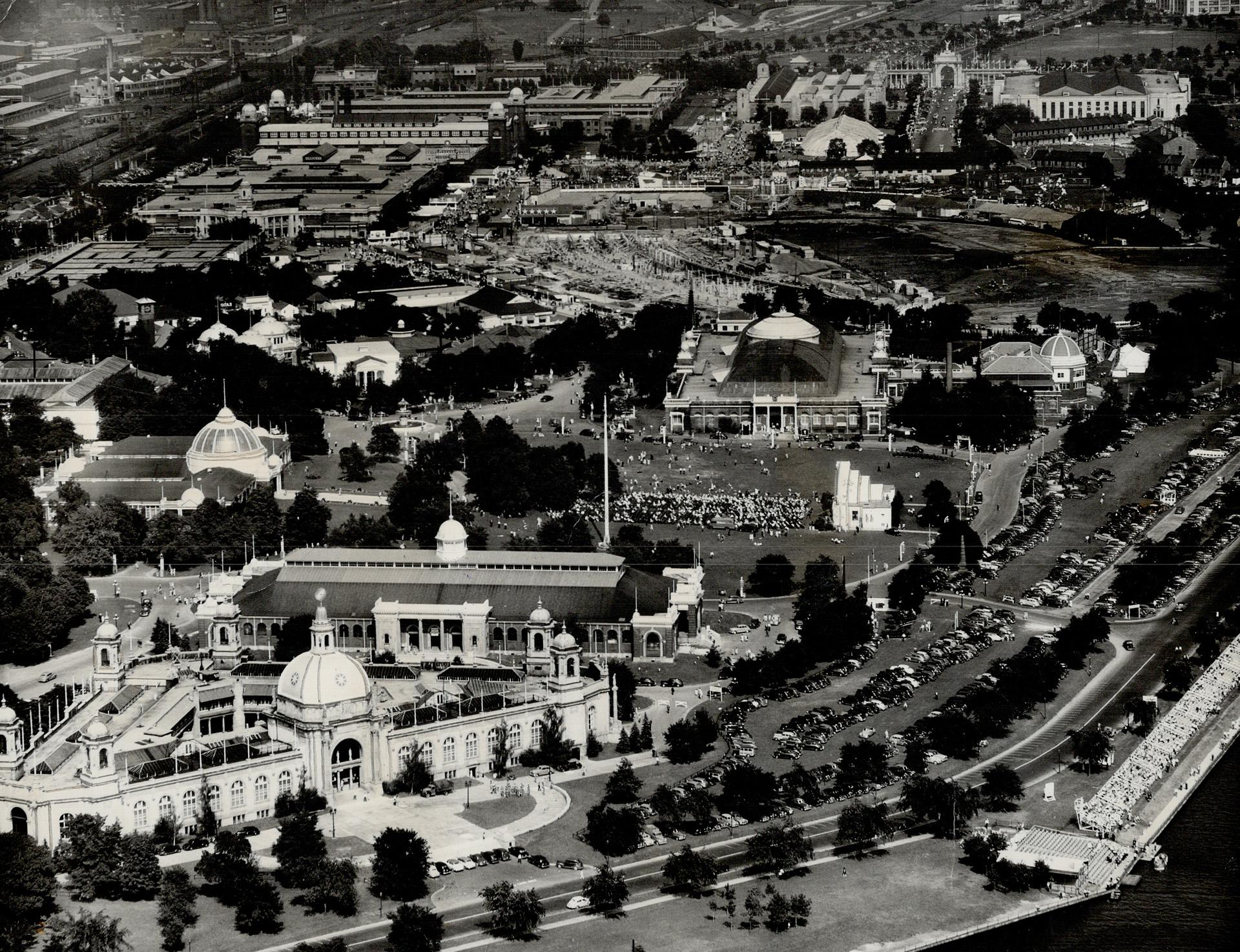
Aerial view of the 1947 Canadian National Exhibition. The ruins of the Grandstand are visible. The Dance Tent is located just to the east of the Grandstand.

The CNE resumed in 1947, with no Grandstand to hold shows or sports. Exhibits included demonstrations of plastics and synthetics. The CNE re-introduced marathon swims. The Women's five mile swim was won by Bernice Looney, who would also win the following three swims. The men's swim winner was Ben Gazel. The CNE continued the swims, billed as "world championships" until 1953. Toronto swimmer Cliff Lumsdon would win several of the marathon swims from 1949 onwards, earning total winnings to CA$48,950 for his career.

The City constructed a covered north-side 22,000-seat grandstand (known as CNE Grandstand and later Exhibition Stadium) for CA$3.5 million, which opened in 1948. It was used for concerts, auto racing and military tattoos during the CNE. In 1959, the Toronto Argonauts football team moved to the site and a south-side bleacher stand was built.

In 1949, the Canadian International Air Show moved to the CNE. The CNE had held aerial displays dating back to 1919, when Fokker D VII fighters were flown along the waterfront and 1939, when RCAF aircraft made a flypast.

In 1954, the CNE discontinued its marathon swims and sponsored a Lake Ontario-crossing swim by American swimmer Florence Chadwick. Canadian swimmers Marilyn Bell and Winnie Roach Leuszler decided to challenge Chadwick, setting the stage for the famous crossing by Bell after Chadwick and Roach dropped out. Chadwick had been promised CA$10,000 if she completed the race, and received $2,500 while Bell received the CA$10,000. Bell was greeted by 300,000 Torontonians at the waterfront, received prizes of CA$60,000 at a public reception had a ticker-tape parade on Bay Street and a public reception at the Band Shell. In 1955, the CNE attempted to hold another across-the-lake swim, but it was cancelled for safety reasons. Instead, a 32-mile marathon was held, won by Cliff Lumsdon. Independently, swimmers attempted to cross Lake Ontario to match Bell's achievement, leading to the drowning death of Clifford Snowlton after completing only 3.5 mi (5.6 km). Swimming events at the CNE were cancelled in 1956, only to brought back from 1961 until 1964.

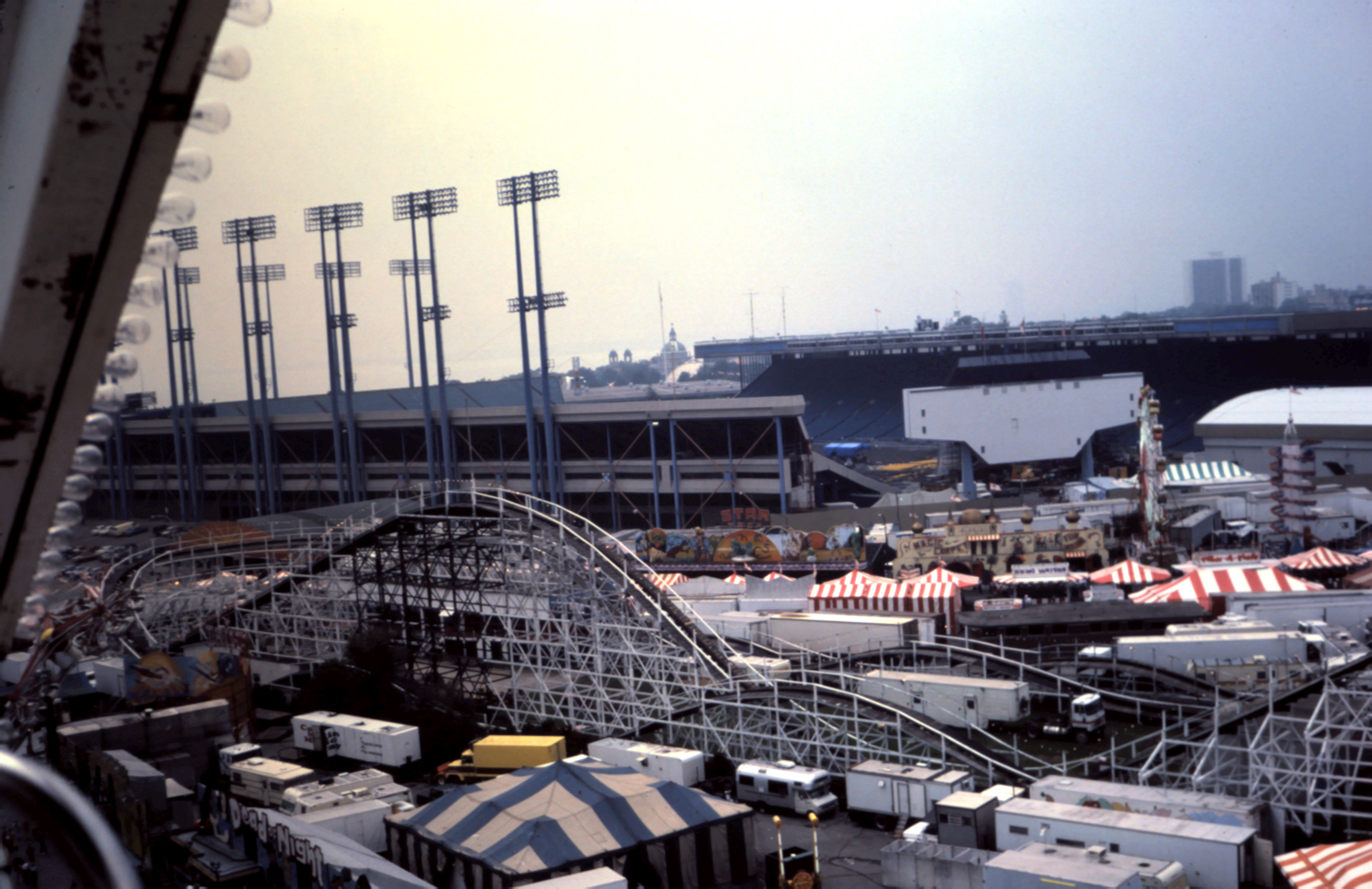
The now vanished "Flyer" rollercoaster, and the likewise vanished Exhibition Stadium at the CNE in 1985, as seen from the giant Ferris wheel.

After the war, the Stanley Barracks continued to be occupied, now as emergency post-war housing. In 1951, the final families moved out and the City demolished all but the stone buildings. Although there was public sentiment to keep the stone buildings, all but the Officer's Quarters were demolished in 1953 for fair parking. While the City wanted to demolish the Quarters also, public opposition arose to its demolition, including Governor-General Vincent Massey, and the decision was reversed. The Canadian Sports Hall of Fame moved into the quarters in 1955 through 1957 at the fair before moving to the Press Building. For the 1959 fair, the new Marine Museum of Upper Canada opened in the Stanley Barracks' Officer Quarters.

New buildings and structures continued to be constructed, including the Queen Elizabeth Building and Theatre and the Better Living Centre. The CA$1.5 million Food Building was opened in 1954 to replace the 'Pure Foods Building with a 50% larger facility. The Princess Margaret Fountain, designed by Design Craft, was opened by Princess Margaret on July 31, 1958.

In 1955, the Shell Oil Tower (later known as the Bulova Tower) was erected. It was a see-through structure of glass and steel with an observation platform at 90 feet (27 m) above the ground. The tower was demolished to make way for the Indy race, which paid the cost of demolition. It had been closed the previous two years due to safety concerns.

In 1958, the fair was extended from 14 to 16 days. In 1960, another CNE food staple was introduced - "Tiny Tom Donuts", freshly fried mini-doughnuts sold at booths. In 1968, changes in blue laws allowed the CNE to open for the first time on Sundays, extending the fair to 18 days.

In 1961, the exhibition was successful in luring the Hockey Hall of Fame to the site in a new building. The Sports Hall of Fame shared space in the building before a new wing of the building was opened in 1967 for its exclusive use. The Halls of Fame were open year-round, but admission was free during the fair.

The 1962 fair was the last for the men's open-water marathon swim, won by Herman Willemse, and the 1963 fair held the last women's swim, won by Greta Andersen.

In 1966, Conklin Shows built the "Alpine Way" cable-car system, connecting people from the west side of the Food Building to near the Princes' Gate. The Alpine Way was reported to cost CA$710,000 (equivalent to $6,661,829 in 2025). It carried passengers 2,175 feet (663 m) at 100 feet (30 m) above-ground for a bird's eye view of the fair. In exchange for its construction, Conklin Shows was given 85% of the proceeds for its first ten years, and 75% of the proceeds for the next ten years. While it was prone to leaving passengers stranded in mid-air occasionally, it was very popular. In 1971, it was estimated to carry 400,000 passengers every fair and was Conklin's most profitable attraction.

That same year, one of the sideshows entombed a young woman surrounded by 45 lb (20 kg) blocks of ice. Peggy McLellan, the 14-year-old young woman entombed would get air from the melting ice. McLellan stayed in the ice for 20-minute periods for CA$75 per week. McLellan quipped that she would stay in longer if the ice was flavoured.

In 1967, Canada's Centennial year, special events and exhibits were held. The Ex held an exhibit of Indigenous culture at the fair, entitled the "Indian Hall of Fame" in the Better Living Centre. The exhibit included a totem pole, carvings by Wilmer Nadjiwon, artifacts of Tom Longboat and was hosted by actor John Yesno. It deliberately was a celebration rather than protest at the current condition of Indigenous peoples at the time. The CNE Bandshell was decorated as a large Canadian flag birthday cake, 160 ft (49 m) long, 80 ft (24 m) high and 60 ft (18 m) wide. The Midway was dressed up to look like an 1867 era Western town. The Seagram Cavalcade of Canadian art displayed 300 paintings at the CNE Art Gallery, and the Century of Progress Building displayed items from Canada's history as well as "Canada 2000" a display of what Canada would be like in 2000.

In 1972, the Electrical and Engineering Building (of 1927) just west of the Princes' Gate was demolished due to structural concerns. Exhibits in the building were moved to the Automotive Building. The Queen Elizabeth Building was used in its entirety for an exhibit by the People's Republic of China. In 1974, the International Building, hosting a Spain exhibit, burned down. The building had annually featured a different country with product, travel and tourism exhibits. It was not replaced.

In 1978, the CNE celebrated its 100th year. A highlight was its "Antique Midway", a collection of working antique rides. This included a 1923 ferris wheel, a 1928 steam-driven merry-go-round and a 1928 "Lindy loop", billed as the only one in the world still operating. The side shows were also antique, including a "Death on the Guillotine" illusion. Another exhibit was a "Century of Transportation" outdoor exhibit of antique carriages and other vehicles. The CNE debuted its "Centennial Bandstand" north of the Horticultural Building. The anniversary was further commemorated with a commemorative stamp issued by Canada Post, depicting the Princes' Gate. The "Our Canada" Pavilion in the Automotive Building, sponsored by the Government of Canada, had its most ambitious exhibit to date. It had a hot-air balloon ride, displays by 34 departments, the "100 years of Canadian Fashion" shows, a deep-sea submersible, and a special Citizenship Court ceremony for 500 new Canadian citizens.

The 1979 fair was themed "The Year of the Child", temporarily renaming the midway. A large tent was set up, called the "Roller Disco" for dancing to disco music on roller skates. The tent had come from Washington, D.C., where it had been used by dignitaries to the White House. Other highlights of the fair were motor boat races on the waterfront, the Canadian Arm Wrestling Championship, the Ontario 5-pin bowling championship, a Pan-American Jiu-Jitsu Championship, plus international Tae Kwon-Do and snooker tournaments.

== 1990s decade of change ==
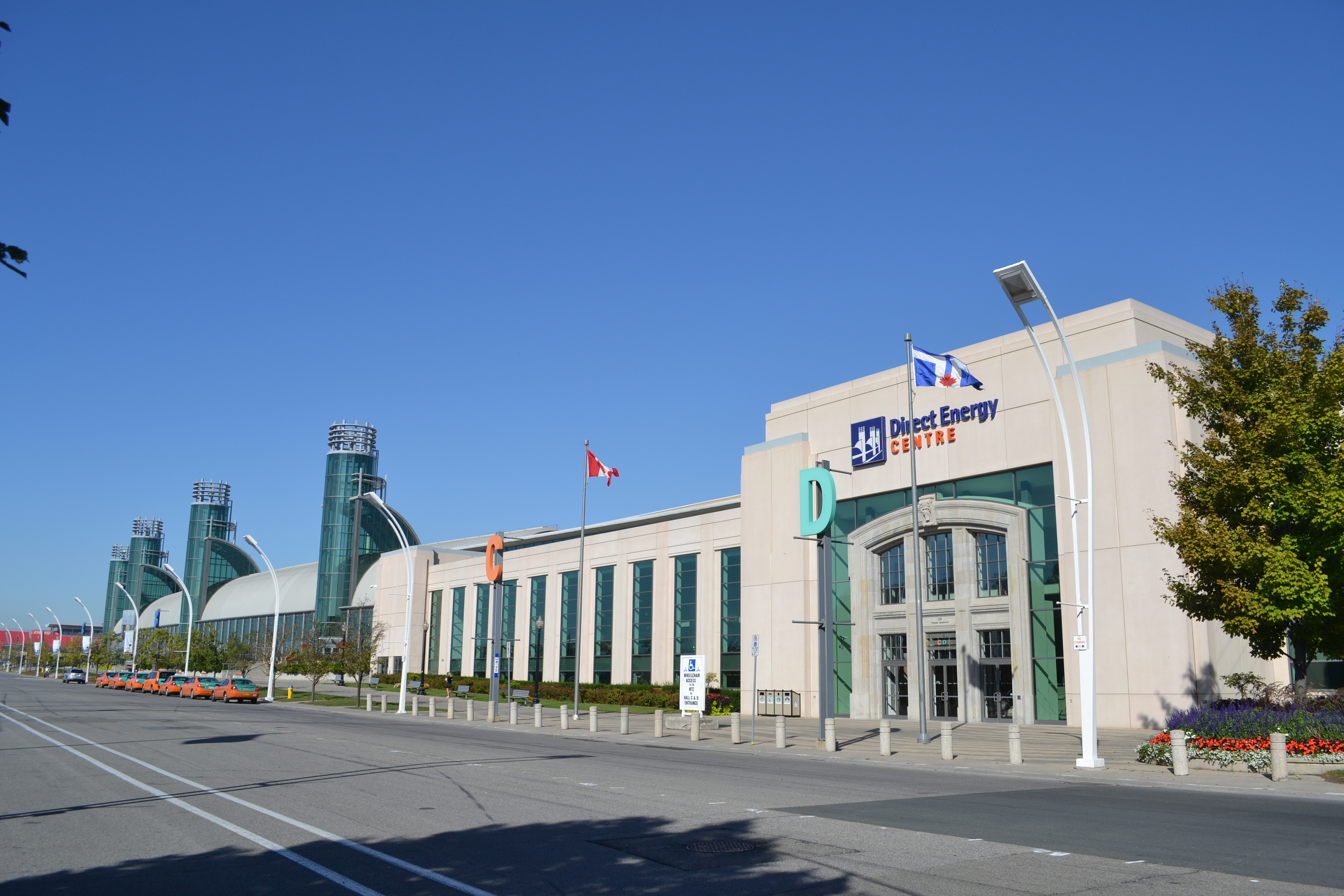
New Trade Centre

By 1990, the fairgrounds had lost the Blue Jays and Argonauts. Major changes were made to reinvigorate the site and reduce annual deficits. In 1997, the new 1,000,000 square feet (93,000 m^{2}) National Trade Centre (now the Enercare Centre) exhibition complex was built west of the Princes' Gate on the site of the old Electrical and Engineering Building. It was integrated with the Coliseum and the Agriculture Annex, forming a large, configurable exhibition space with arena and agricultural facilities that cater to trade conventions and consumer shows year-round. The new building meant large changes for the site. The streetcar loop was moved north, under the Gardiner Expressway. A tunnel under Princes' Boulevard was made to connect the trade centre to the Automotive Building, which became a year-round meeting centre, and the building was unused during the fair.

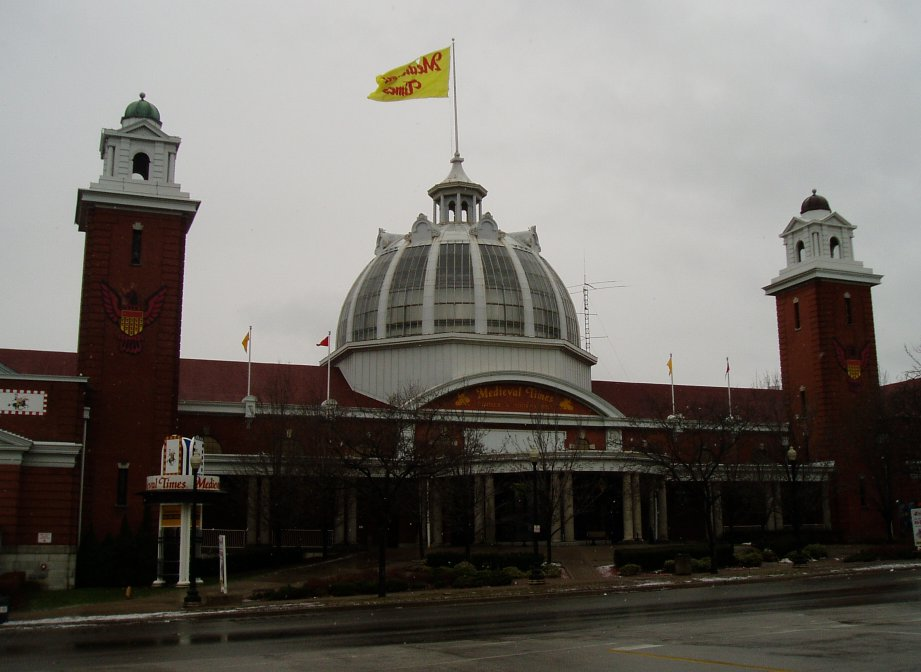
The exterior of the Government Building, which has been the Toronto location of Medieval Times since its debut at the 1993 CNE.

At the same time, the older buildings at the western end of the fair were not up to contemporary standards, the whole Exhibition Place site was running a yearly deficit, and there were no funds for refits. Three of the westernmost former exhibit buildings have since been leased out to private attractions and are used year-round, generating revenue for the site, but are not part of the fair. The Ontario Government Building, which held travel and nature exhibits of Ontario during the fair, had been abandoned when Ontario Place was built. The Arts, Crafts and Hobbies, and Horticulture Buildings were also decrepit. The exhibit space lost was replaced with the National Trade Centre space. This shrunk the fair's footprint and the Dufferin Gate is no longer used as an admission gate to the fair.

The Flyer, a wooden roller coaster built in 1953 by Conklin Shows, was a permanent fixture that lasted until 1992. By that time, the ride was losing money due to declining ridership and the Exhibition Association made the decision to tear it down. The 1993 CNE opened with the grand opening of Medieval Times at the Government Building. The dinner theater still operates in that building as of 2025, however it is a separate year-round attraction outside of the CNE fairgrounds. The popular Alpine Way was demolished in 1994 to make way for the trade centre building. In 1998, the Marine Museum closed, moving to the Harbourfront district. In 1999, Exhibition Stadium was demolished, ending its use as a concert venue.

Attendance declined in the 1990s and the CNE posted an annual loss every year of the 1990s. In response, the CNE cut costs, such as the horse competitions, including breed judging that had been done since the fair opened, despite the protests of horse breeders. The CNE made a modest profit of CA$58,000 in 2000.

== 21st century ==
In 2003, the CNE celebrated its 125th anniversary, despite the first four days of the exhibition being hampered by the Northeast blackout of 2003. In 2005, the CNE introduced a Mardi Gras parade. In 2010, the CNE received EcoLogo Certification, making it the 'greenest' fair in North America.

In 2007, BMO Field opened, hosting new Major League Soccer team Toronto FC on the site of the old Grandstand and the Hall of Fames building. While the building replaced the Grandstand for sports, it does not host concerts or the spectacles that the old Grandstand did. Concerts were now held at the Ontario Place Molson Amphitheatre which had opened in 1995. The Amphitheatre is not part of the CNE.

In 2012, Canadian Olympic gold-medalists Tessa Virtue and Scott Moir performed in La Vie: Aerial Acrobatics & Ice Skating Show during the first 15 days of the fair, and three-time World Champion and Olympic silver-medalist Elvis Stojko closed out the show on Labour Day weekend. In 2015, Virtue and Moir returned for another ice skating and aerial acrobatics show, Bon Voyage!

In April 2013, the CNE became independent of the City and the Exhibition Place board, becoming the Exhibition Place's primary tenant. In October 2013, the CNE cancelled the CNE Horse Show competition due to low attendance. Its "HorseCapades" entertainment program at the Horse Palace, which is held prior to the fair continued.

In both 2013 and 2014, the CNE featured a zip line ride. The ride launched from a ten-storey launch tower north of BMO Field. The landing tower, southwest of the current Enercare Centre, was 60 ft (18 m) high. The zip line ride consisted of four lines, each measuring nearly 1,100 ft (340 m).

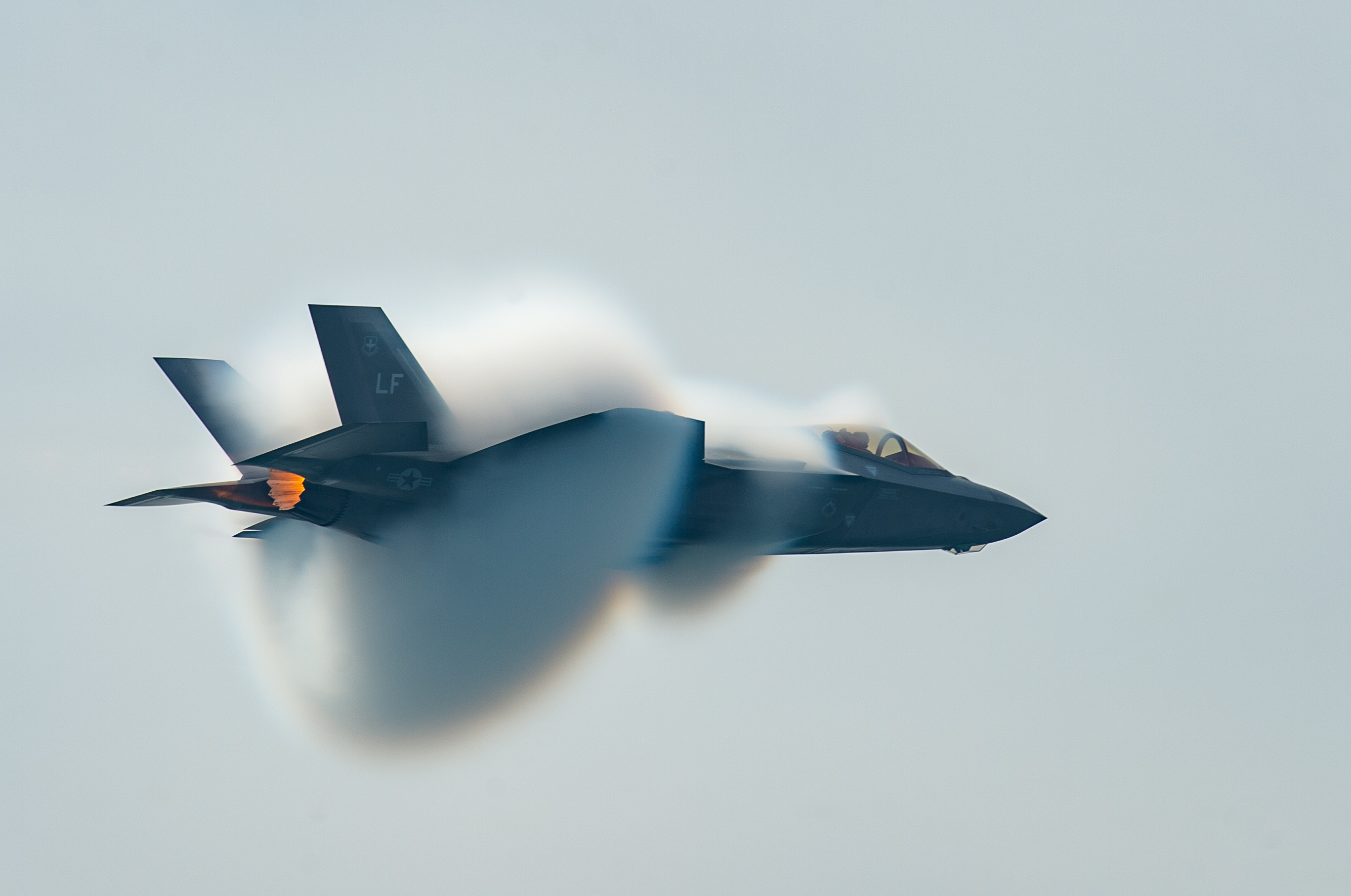
An F-35 Lightning II performs a high-speed pass during the 70th Canadian International Air Show

In 2016, the CNE saw the return of programming at the CNE waterfront with a daily water ski show, and national and international competitions. The same year also saw the introduction of the CNE Innovation Garage in partnership with Ryerson University, featuring a pitch competition for young inventors and displays of new inventions and projects such as ZooShare biogas.

Completed in 2017, the Hotel X Toronto was built on the Stanley Barracks site which had been used for parking. This completed the suite of facilities for meetings and conventions along with the Enercare Centre and the Automotive Building. All three buildings are interconnected by indoor connections allowing access free of weather concerns to meeting organizers and attendees. The former baseball diamond at the very west of the site was converted to a Toronto Raptors practice facility. The annual baseball tournament was moved outside of the site to Coronation Park.

In 2020, the CNE and all associated in-person events were cancelled due to the COVID-19 pandemic—the first time the CNE had been cancelled since World War II. The CNE reported that this caused a loss of over $35 million in potential revenue, and $128 million in economic impact to Ontario. In 2021, due to the continued pandemic, the City of Toronto government cancelled all city-led and permitted outdoor in-person events through at least September 6, 2021, therefore cancelling the CNE and all associated in-person events for the second year in a row. As revenue from previous editions are reinvested into subsequent editions, the CNE stated that "the cancellations and financial losses of 2020 and 2021 will have a consequential impact on the future of the CNE."

The CNE resumed operations in 2022. The re-opening on August 19, 2022, was made possible due to funding received from both the Government of Canada ($7.1 million) and the province of Ontario ($1.6 million). The financial assistance facilitated the introduction of new programming of immersive heritage exhibits, enhancements to the Gaming Garage, a nightly drone show and a multimedia show called "NEVAEH & the Northstar", both presented by VinFast.

The 2023 CNE surpassed the 2015 attendance with 1,604,000 visitors passing through its gates. Attractions included the Fountain Show and the Canadian International Air Show on the waterfront. The Coliseum held an Ice Skating and Acrobatics Show "Time Flies" with Elvis Stojko. The Better Living Centre hosted a Pink Floyd exhibition. The bandshell's entertainment included Dionne Warwick, Jann Arden, Amanda Marshall, Kim Mitchell, Tynomi Banks and Kardinal Offishal.

In 2023, the Canadian National Exhibition marked the 130th anniversary of the Ferris Wheel by welcoming the Super Wheel, the first of its kind to appear in Toronto. Fairgoers had views of the lake and the city, inside 36-climate controlled gondolas that held four to six guests per gondola.

== Attendance ==
Attendance has been recorded since 1911. According to the CNE, figures before 1981 were intentionally inflated.

Year	Attendance (million unless otherwise)	Ref.
1879	100 (thousand) (est.)	
1883	171 (thousand) (est.)	
1893	267 (thousand) (est.)	
1895	270 (thousand) (est.)	
1903	527 (thousand) (est.)	
1913	1.009	
1914	768 (thousand)	
1915	864 (thousand)	
1916	910 (thousand)	
1921	1.242	
1922	1.372	
1928	2.00	
1941	1.84	
1947	2.36	
1952	2.72	
1953	2.62	
1954	2.82	
1955	2.81	
1956	2.83	
1957	2.80	
1958	2.96	
1959	2.91	

Year	Attendance (million)	Ref.
1960	2.96	
1961	2.87	
1962	3.01	
1963	3.08	
1964	2.99	
1965	2.96	
1966	2.99	
1967	3.02	
1968	3.24	
1969	3.19	
1970	3.17	
1971	3.21	
1972	3.56	
1973	3.57	
1974	3.25	
1975	3.48	
1976	3.59	
1977		
1978	3.59	
1979	3.34	
1980	3.06	

Year	Attendance (million)	Ref.
1981	2.30	
1982	2.22	
1983	2.53	
1984	2.10	
1985	2.29	
1986	2.14	
1987	2.12	
1988	2.01	
1989	2.05	
1990	1.71	
1991	1.98	
1992	1.85	
1993	1.77	
1994	1.67	
1995	1.56	
1996	1.71	
1997	1.68	
1998	1.79	
1999	1.37	

Year	Attendance (million)	Ref.
2000	1.38	
2001	1.40	
2002	1.40	
2003	1.25	
2004		
2005	1.25	
2006	1.38	
2007	1.24	
2008	1.31	
2009	1.32	
2010		
2011	1.31	
2012	1.39	
2013		
2014	1.43	
2015	1.60	
2016	1.54	
2017	1.56	
2018	1.30	
2019	1.46	
2022	1.56	
2023	1.60	
2024	1.49	
