= Hotel Giraffe =

Hotel in Manhattan, New York

- by Library Hotel Collection
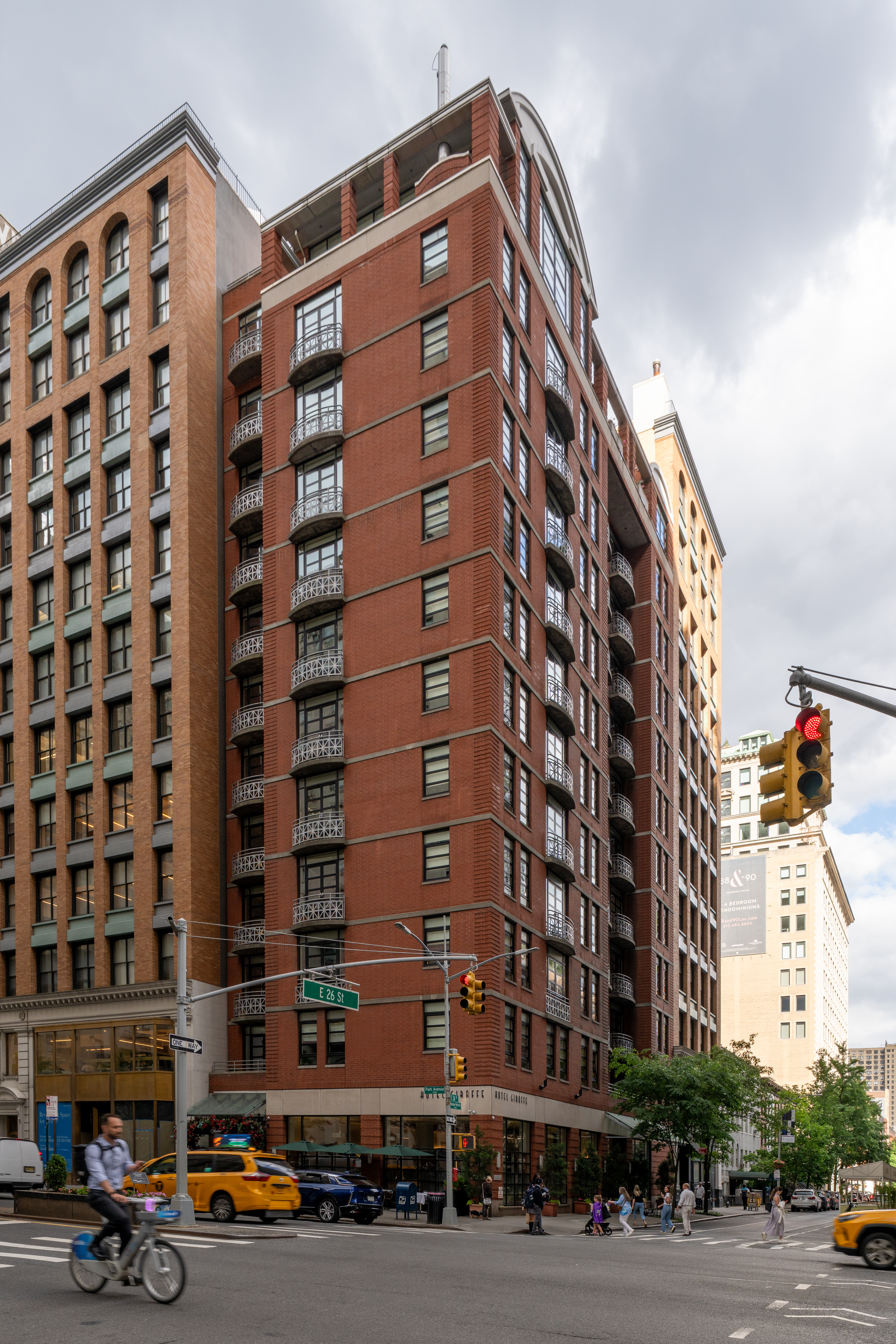

- Location within Manhattan

General information
- Location: Corner of 26th Street and Park Avenue South, New York City
- Coordinates: 40°44′32″N 73°59′05″W
- Opened: 1999

Design and construction
- Architect: Stephen B. Jacobs

Website
- hotelgiraffe.com

Hotel Giraffe is a luxury hotel in Rose Hill, Manhattan, New York City. It has won many awards, such as Best Boutique Hotel–2007, according to CitySearch.com. Hotel Giraffe is located at the northeast corner of Park Avenue South and 26th Street.

The establishment is part of the Library Hotel Collection, a boutique hotel group owned by Henry Kallan. There are four hotels within the LHC: the Hotel Giraffe, the Casablanca Hotel Times Square, the Library Hotel, and the Hotel Elysee.

Hotel Giraffe opened in December 1999 and was upgraded several times in its first decade.

== Design ==
Architect Stephen B. Jacobs and his wife, interior designer Andi Pepper, were in charge of the design of the building when Henry Kallan opened Hotel Giraffe in 1999.

Guestrooms at Hotel Giraffe are inspired by the rich lavish colors and textures of the Art Moderne Period. Hotel Giraffe offers 73 guestrooms, including 21 suites.

== News and media ==
Hotel Giraffe was shown in Sex and the City: The Movie. The Piano Suite was transformed into Mr. Big's apartment. The penthouse at Hotel Giraffe stood in for "Big's" apartment in the film; other scenes were shot in the hotel as well. The Hotel offered a "Divas weekend."
