= Library Hotel =

Hotel in Manhattan, New York

Coordinates: 40°45′7.65″N 73°58′45.87″W

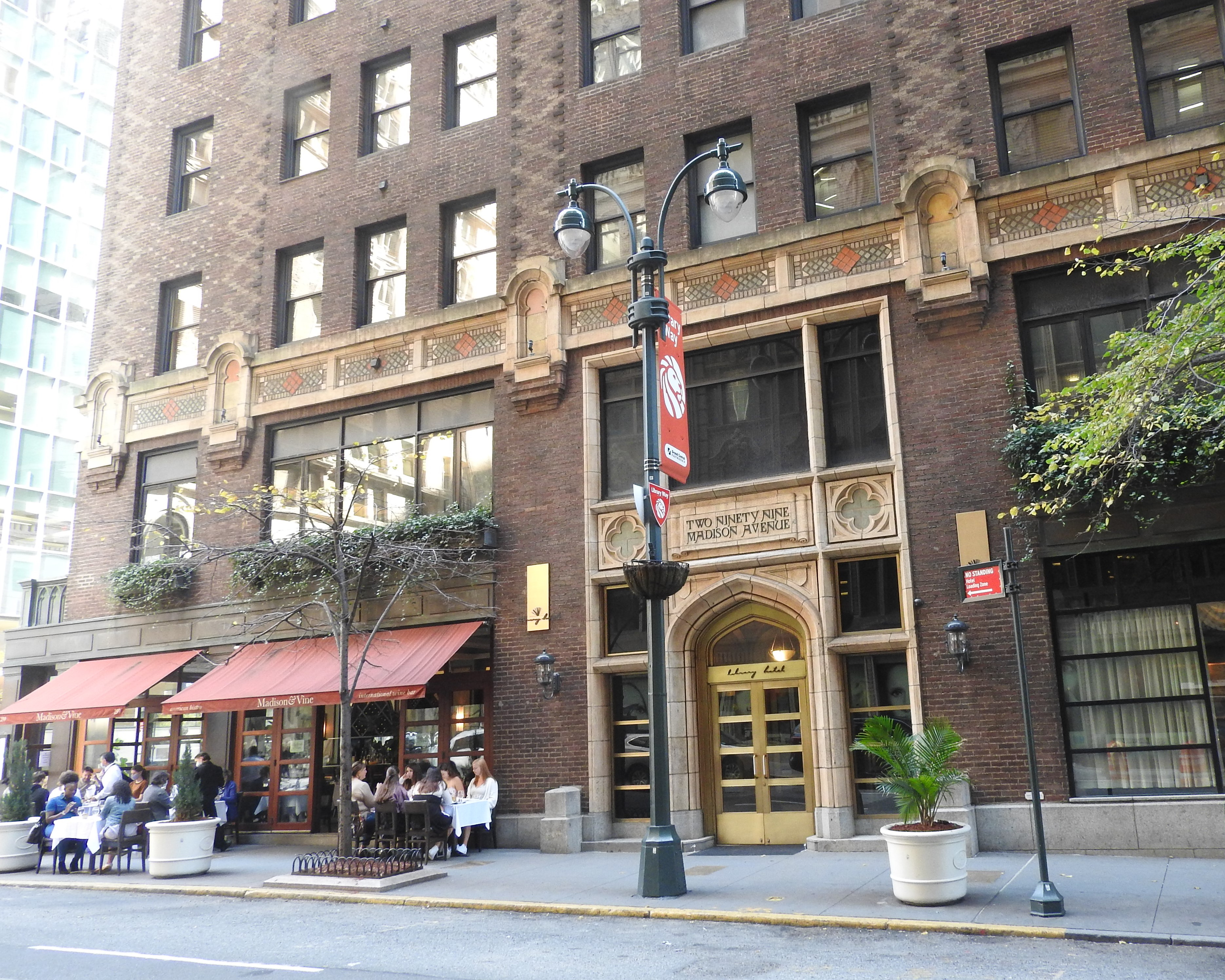
The hotel's front entrance

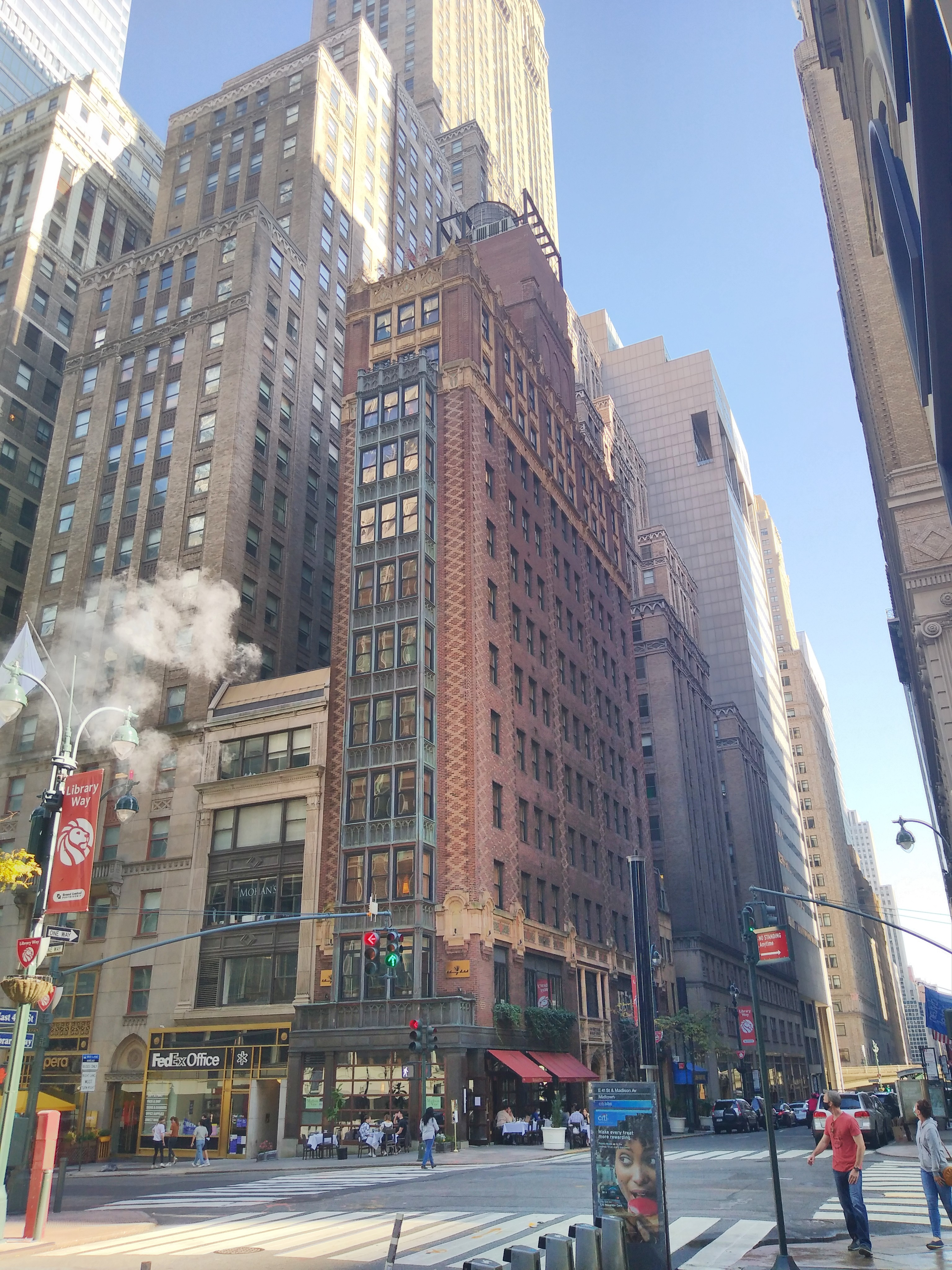
View toward the hotel

Library Hotel is a 60-room boutique hotel in Midtown Manhattan, New York City. It is located at 299 Madison Avenue (at 41st Street), near Bryant Park, the New York Public Library Main Branch, and Grand Central Terminal. The hotel was designed by architect Stephen B. Jacobs.

Each of the Library Hotel's ten guest floors is themed after a major category of the Dewey Decimal Classification. The 5th floor, for example, is the 500s (the Sciences). Each room is a subcategory or genre, such as Mathematics (Room 500.001) or Botany (Room 500.004). Dewey categories 000, 100, and 200 are placed on the 10th, 11th, and 12th floors, respectively. There are 50–100 books and decorations in each room that accompany the theme, for a total of 6,000 books throughout the hotel.

Due to this classification scheme, the hotel owners were sued in 2003 by OCLC (owners of the Dewey Decimal Classification system). OCLC subsequently reached an agreement with the hotel owners, thus enabling the hotel to continue using the Dewey system.

The Library Hotel was once actively operated by Henry Kallan through a Limited liability limited partnership. With the 2025 reorganization and investments by multiple private investors within real estate development, Library Hotel Collection transitioned into a Limited Liability Company with Henry's minority ownership stake towards Joyful Heart Foundation, a non-profit to heal & empower women. With a new principal managing president, his fiduciary responsibility is to manage & oversee the hotel chain, branding & organization, having been appointed & selected by its stakeholders.

The Library Hotel Collection includes Manhattan's Hotel Giraffe, Hotel Elysée, Casablanca Hotel, Hotel X Toronto.
