= New Fort York =

Former Canadian military facility

- on the Garrison Reserve, west of Toronto Harbour in Toronto, Ontario, Canada
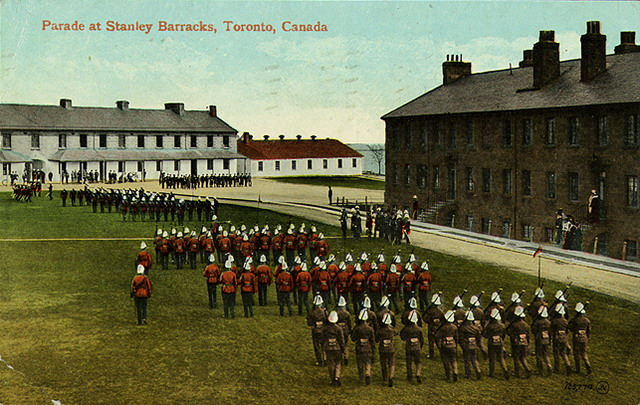
- The Canadian Militia on the parade grounds of Stanley Barracks, c. 1910

Site information
- Type: Military base

Location
- Location in Toronto
- Coordinates: 43.6329665°N 79.4136691°W

Site history
- Built: 1840
- Materials: Queenston limestone, wood

New Fort York, later the Stanley Barracks, is a former British and Canadian military base in Toronto, Ontario, Canada, located on the Lake Ontario shoreline. It was built in 1840–1841 to replace Toronto's original Fort York at the mouth of Garrison Creek as the primary military base for the settlement. Unlike the older fort, many of the new fort buildings were made with limestone instead of wood. A protective wall was planned for the new fort but was never built. The fort was used by the British army until 1870, and the Canadian military subsequently used the fort to train troops for the Second Boer War, World War I and World War II. It also trained one of the first regiments of the North-West Mounted Police. The Canadian military stopped using it after World War II and the fort was demolished in the 1950s. Only the Officers' Quarters building remains on the site.

== History ==
=== British era ===
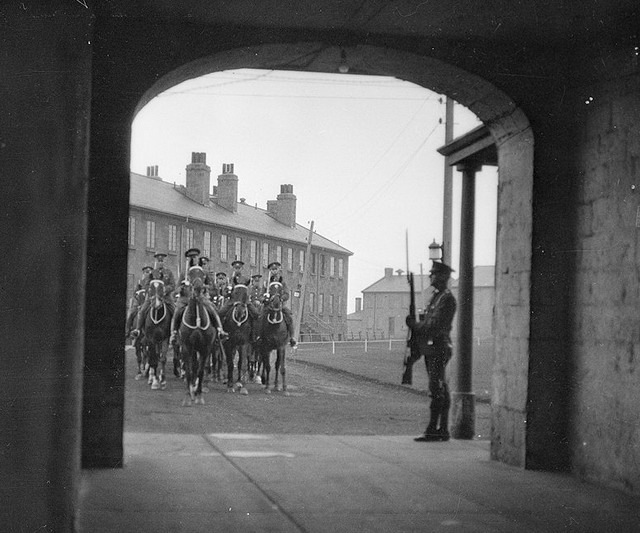
The Royal Canadian Dragoons was one of several Canadian militia regiments stationed at the Fort.

When the British set up the military defences of York, Upper Canada, a military reservation was created by Lieutenant-Governor Simcoe, roughly bordered by today's Dufferin Street, Queen Street, Peter Street and the lakeshore. Two 18-pounder guns were placed on the lakeshore just to the east of the future fort site, known as the Western Battery, to protect the approach to the harbour. Guns were also placed on the western shoreline of the Toronto Islands. The Western Battery guns were destroyed in the War of 1812's Battle of York in 1813.

As the old Fort York's wood buildings aged, it was determined that new accommodations were needed. In addition, private buildings were being rented in the town to accommodate soldiers. To finance the new fort, Lieutenant Governor Colborne approved the sale of some of the military reserve lands in 1833. It was not until after the 1837 rebellion that action was taken to start construction. Approval was given in 1839 by Lieutenant-Governor Bond Head to build a new fort to accommodate 300 soldiers, based on an 1833 plan drawn up by Lieutenant-Colonel Gustavus Nicolls.

A series of six stone buildings were constructed around 1840 by the Royal Engineers of the British Army with the biggest building being the Officers' Quarters. The two-storey Queenston limestone structure cost £19,000 (equivalent to £1,673,512 in 2025). The fort also included two privates' barracks (holding 207 and 105 soldiers), a hospital, an officers' stable, barracks master's store, an engine house, gunpowder magazine and a canteen, all organized around a parade square. The original plan included fortifications surrounding the fort but as a cost-saving measure a cedar picket fence to enclose the fort was constructed, with fortifications to be added at some later time. A road was built between the forts, entering the new fort through a wrought-iron gate and passing under an arch in the eastern privates' barracks.

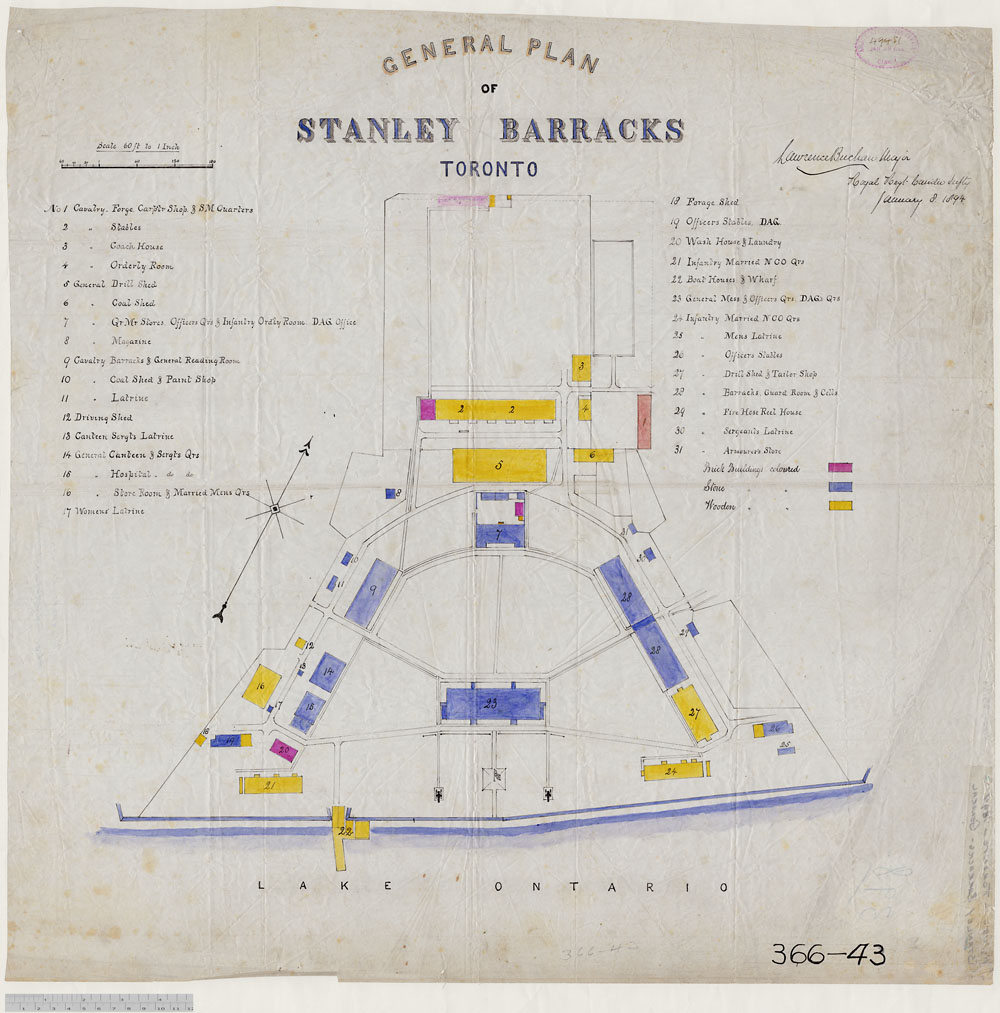
General Plan of Stanley Barracks

Although living conditions were considered good for the time, conditions during the winter were considered very cold, and keeping water from freezing was difficult. During the 1850s, the number of British troops at the fort was reduced, having been deployed in the Crimean War. Numbers rose again in the 1860s during the United States Civil War. In the 1860s, the space at the new fort was insufficient and The 13th Hussars were quartered in the nearby Crystal Palace exhibition building.

=== Transfer to Canada ===
In 1867, three of the British colonies, including the Province of Canada, united to form the new country of Canada. In 1870, the British Army withdrew from the Fort, with the property turned over to the Canadian Militia, the official turnover happening in 1871. The fort became mostly vacant, used only by a few military families for living quarters and the Ontario Rifle Association for training and exhibitions. In 1874, the new North-West Mounted Police used the fort to train a group of recruits for deployment in Manitoba.

In 1883, the Government of Canada established the first permanent force of the military and a new military purpose for the fort was established. After some repairs, the fort reopened in 1884 as an infantry school and base for the Regiment of Canadian Artillery, Company C, later named The Royal Canadian Regiment (RCR). The Company would see its first action the following year in the North-West Rebellion.

The rifle ranges of the fort led to incidents with passing boats and pedestrians. Bullets would occasionally hit boats if they strayed too close and two persons were struck by bullets in 1887. The Canadian military purchased land for a new rifle range in 1889 just west of Etobicoke Creek in Toronto Township (Lakeview, Mississauga), just west of Long Branch.

In 1893, The Royal Canadian Dragoons were transferred to the fort. That same year the fort was renamed Stanley Barracks after Lord Stanley of Preston, the retired Governor General of Canada. Lord Stanley is also famous for donating hockey's Stanley Cup. In 1894, the Dragoons performed their first Dragoon Musical Ride described as "drill pattern formation riding to music at three and a half paces." The Musical Ride would be performed for many years by the Dragoons until they became an armoured regiment in 1940. It was a popular feature of the CNE Grandstand show.

Later in the 1890s, troops of the Dragoons and the RCR from the fort helped to police the Yukon Gold Rush. Troops of the Dragoons and RCR also joined British forces fighting in South Africa in the Second Boer War. The better pay offered to soldiers to fight in South Africa also led to desertions. In 1901, 46 men of the Dragoons and RCR deserted.

=== Transfer to City of Toronto ===
In 1878, the Provincial Agricultural Fair of Canada West was held on the reserve. The next year, the annual Toronto Industrial Exhibition, later to become the Canadian National Exhibition (CNE), was held on the site under a lease by the City of Toronto. As the CNE grew in size every year, the City of Toronto sought to take more and more of the Military Reserve. The end of the New Fort and the Military Reserve began in 1903 when the Government of Canada and the City of Toronto entered into an agreement to transfer the lands of the Old Fort, the New Fort and Fort's graveyard to City of Toronto ownership. The City promised to preserve the Old Fort and the graveyard and to allow all military activities on the property to continue until replacement facilities were built.

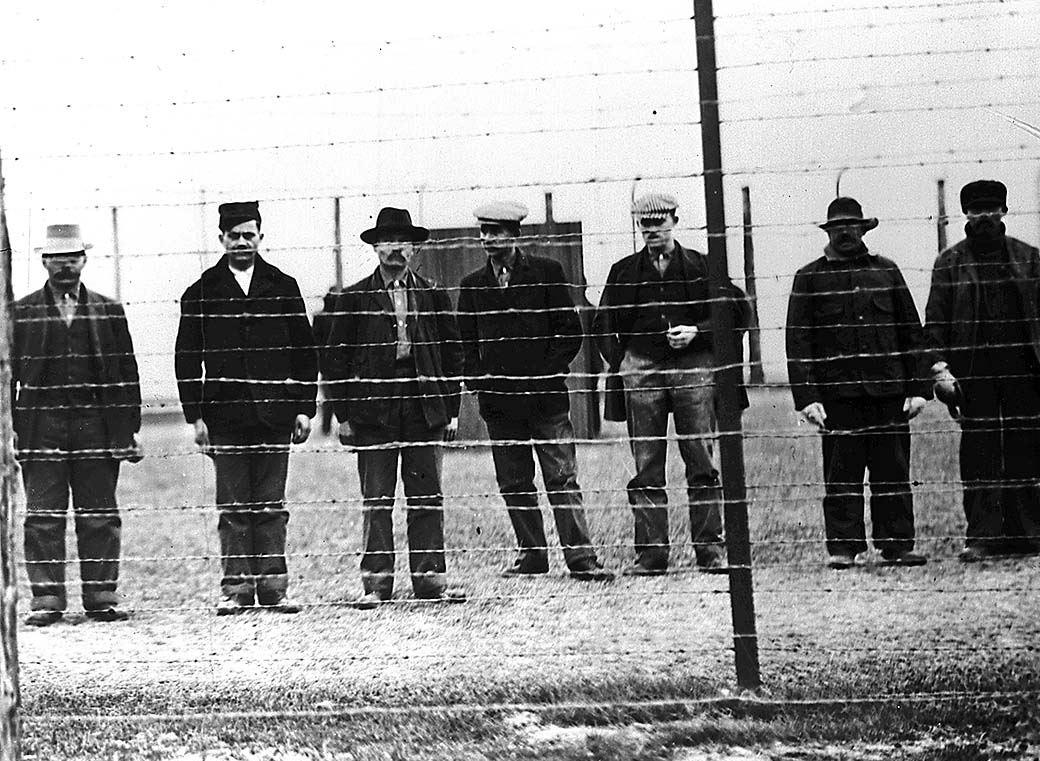
German prisoners of war held in Stanley Barracks during World War I.

During World War I, fort activities expanded to the CNE buildings, which were used for winter quarters, (summer quarters were at Long Branch) although the CNE continued. The barracks were used as a receiving station for the internment of German, Austro-Hungarian, and Turkish citizens, considered "enemy aliens". From 1914 until October 1916, up to 90 men at one time were interned in the west privates' barracks before being transferred to other facilities. Before the war was over, many were pardoned and released upon the signing of pledges of loyalty to the laws of Canada and to report regularly to police stations. Ukrainians, then subjects of the Austro-Hungarian Empire, were held in the barracks. In 1998, the Ukrainian community of Toronto erected a plaque at the Officers' Quarters to memorialize the internment.

In the 1920s, the continued expansion of the CNE meant further encroachment on the Fort grounds. The CNE asked the City of Toronto to give notice for the military to vacate. The new Princes' Boulevard necessitated the demolition of some of the Barracks' buildings, including some stables and the riding school. Room for horses was offered in the buildings used for livestock. A compromise was made and new stables were built and the military offered the use of the Coliseum and Livestock arenas.

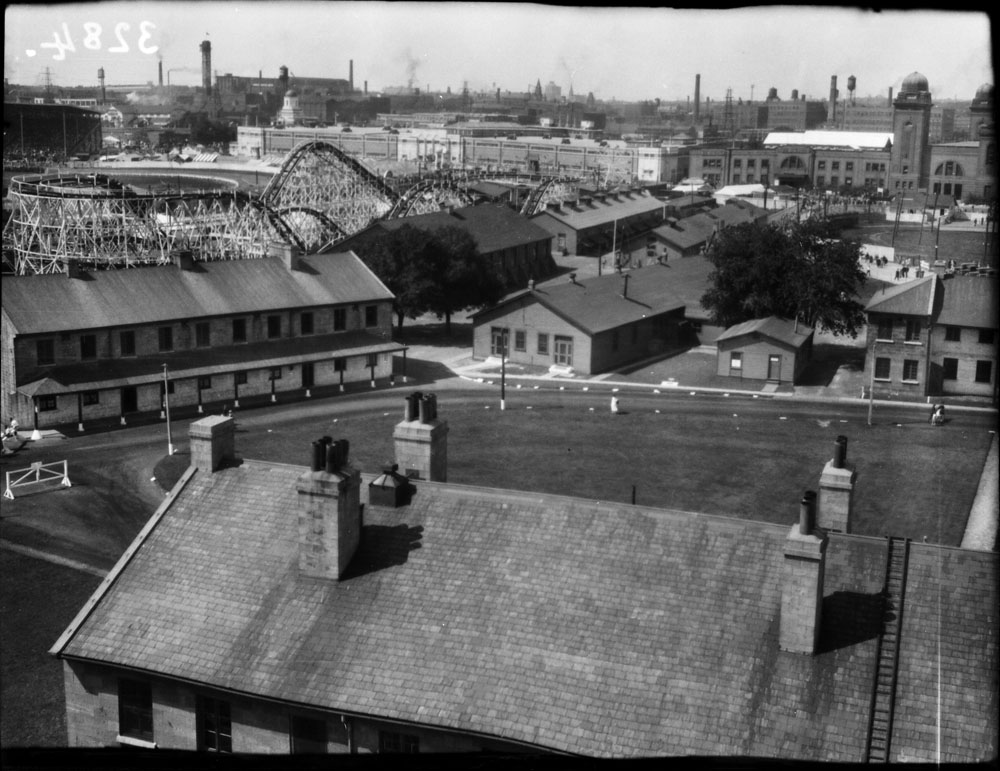
View of fort and Ex buildings in 1931

During World War II, the fort and many of the nearby exhibition buildings were again used by Canadian troops prior to being sent overseas. The Coliseum was used by the Royal Canadian Air Force, the Royal Canadian Artillery used the Dominion Government Building, while the Horse Palace housed the 48th Highlanders, Toronto Scottish, Royal Canadian Ordnance Corps and the B Company of the Royal Canadian Regiment. Other buildings used included the General Exhibits Building, the Graphic Arts Building and the Horticultural Building. The dressing room of the Grandstand was used for anti-gas instruction. The annual CNE went on as scheduled with emphasis on the war effort in Canada as well as Britain, in 1939, 1940 and 1941. Several of the buildings used by the military were open to the public during the Ex. The CNE was not held during 1942–1945. The CNE Camp was used as a demobilization centre for returning troops at the end of the war before closing on June 1, 1946.

After World War II, the military withdrew from Stanley Barracks to the military installation at Long Branch. The Royal Canadian Dragoons had already relocated in 1941 to Camp Borden. The CNE announced a plan to demolish the fort and build a new civic auditorium. However, these plans went on hold, as Toronto was experiencing a housing shortage emergency. The Government of Canada contributed 50% of the cost to convert the buildings (there were 31 at the time) for emergency civilian housing. The military retained its detention facility temporarily. Considered to be in extremely poor condition, the housing began closing down in 1950 and was evacuated by 1951. Demolition of the wooden buildings began in 1951 while families were still living in the barracks.

By September 1951, only the four stone buildings remained: the officers' quarters, the hospital building and the two soldiers' barracks. Community support developed to preserve the Barracks to operate as a museum. Governor-General Vincent Massey advocated to retain the stone buildings. Three of the last four buildings were demolished in 1953 to provide parking for the CNE. The final building remained in limbo. The CNE Association planned to demolish the building for more parking. In 1957, it was saved from demolition by Toronto City Council on the advice of the Toronto Civic Historical Committee.

The gates to the barracks (gate doors forged in England in 1839) were salvaged in 1957 by the owners of the Guild Inn in Scarborough. The gates were re-erected in Toronto on Kingston Road at Guildwood Parkway, at the entrance to Guildwood Village, where they may still be viewed. Lights replaced the stone globes on the top of the gate posts.

The Archaeological and Historic Sites Board of Ontario erected a plaque commemorating the fort on November 11, 1963, near the former Officers' Quarters. The ceremony was attended by the 29th Field Regiment, the 42nd Medium Regiment and the 1st Artillery Locating Regiment of the Royal Canadian Artillery, and the Toronto Garrison Artillery Band. Dignitaries included Lt-General G. G. Simmonds, former chief of the General Canadian Staff, Professor J. M. Careless of the Ontario Historical Sites Board, Col. R. S. Timmons, former commander of The Royal Canadian Dragoons and Maj. W. J. Lennox the artillery chaplain. Timmons, commander of the garrison for 5 1/2 years, unveiled the plaque.

In 2004, plans were developed to build a hotel and conference centre on the fort site, north of the Quarters. A letter of intent was signed by the owner of the Windsor Arms Hotel. A required archaeological dig found the foundations of the stone buildings. The City of Toronto decided not to build on the fort site. Instead, the Automotive Building to the east was converted to a conference centre, the hotel was moved to the east of the fort site and the foundations were to be preserved. The new Hotel X Toronto project adjacent to the site has revealed the barracks' foundations. An entrance pavilion to the hotel is a steel lattice structure that approximates the shape of the enlisted men's barracks. Within, the uncovered foundations are visible through a glass floor. The parade ground has become a landscaped plaza.

Regiments from the British Army and the Canadian militia that were garrisoned at the fort include:

- Royal Canadian Rifles
- Seventy-First Highland Light Infantry
- Royal Artillery
- Thirteenth Hussars
- Canadian Permanent Force
- C Company of the School of Infantry, now The Royal Canadian Regiment
- B Squadron, The Royal Canadian Dragoons

== Officers' Quarters ==
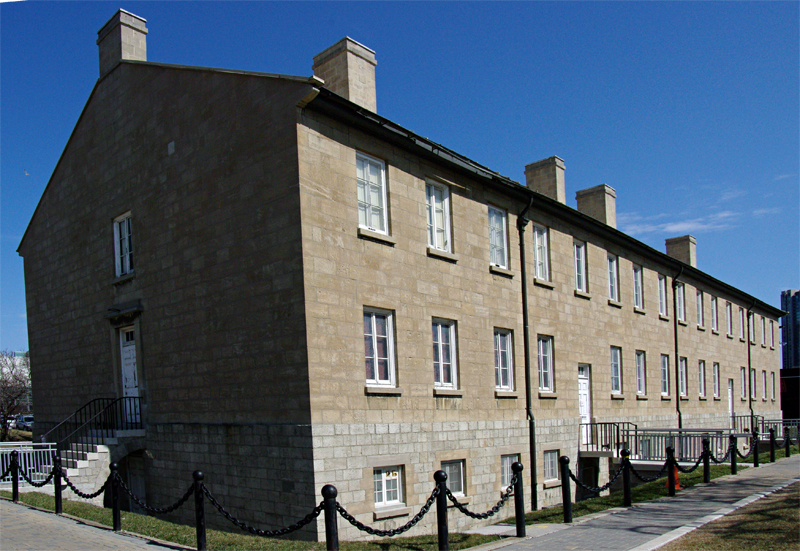
The Officers' Quarters is the only surviving building of New Fort York.

The two-storey Officers' Quarters is designed in the Georgian style with influences of English Palladianism. It rises two storeys, with full basement and attic, on a foundation of Kingston limestone, its thick walls built with Queenston limestone with a surrounding dry moat. Its original roof was covered with slate tiles but was recovered with metal. Its north face was designed to be the front, facing the parade ground. The south face is identical to the north face. The building was organized to give two-thirds to the officers and one-third to the Barracks' Master.

Since 1955, the Officers' Quarters building has served as the home for various museums, including Canada's Sports Hall of Fame, the Hockey Hall of Fame and the Marine Museum. From 1955 to 1957, Canada's Sports Hall of Fame and in 1957, the Hockey Hall of Fame shared space at the Quarters. The Officers' Quarters housed the Marine Museum from 1959 to 1998 until it moved to Harbourfront. The museum has since closed. Vacant since 1998, the Officers' Quarters was opened for one weekend in May 2006 during Doors Open Toronto.

While the building was home to the Marine Museum, the grounds housed two items from Toronto history. The tugboat Ned Hanlan was on display until 2012 on the west side of the building, before it was moved to Hanlan's Point on the Toronto Islands. Canadian National locomotive No. 6213 was located on the east side from 1960 until 2009 when it was moved to Roundhouse Park.

In 1999, Toronto City Council designated the Quarters as a Landmark Heritage Property under the Ontario Heritage Act. In 2009, City Council approved the development of a hotel on the property, just to the east of the fort's site. To the north of the Officers' Quarters, the former parking lot is now a plaza. To the south of the Officers' Quarters is a garden used for outdoor events. The former shoreline of Lake Ontario is outlined on the paving of a pathway along the Quarters. The exterior of the building is being restored, while the use for the building remains undetermined, although considered part of the hotel complex.

According to author Richard Palmisano, the Officers' Quarters has two ghosts: a little girl hunting for her cat, and the girl's father. The building has been on a walking tour for ghosts on the Exhibition grounds.

== See also ==
- History of the Canadian National Exhibition
- Fort Rouillé
- List of forts
- List of oldest buildings and structures in Toronto
