= Toronto Maritime Museum =

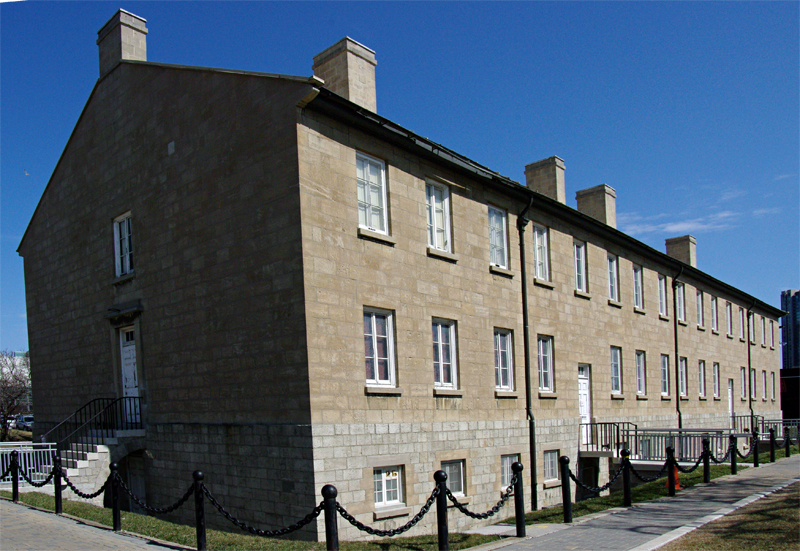
- Stanley Barracks' Officers' Mess used as the Marine Museum
- Established: 1958
- Dissolved: 2008
- Location: Stanley Barracks 1958–1998; Queens Quay, Toronto, Ontario, Canada 1999–2008
- Type: Maritime museum

The Toronto Maritime Museum or Toronto Waterfront Museum or The Pier Museum (prior to 2000, Marine Museum or Marine Museum of Upper Canada) was a museum in Toronto, Ontario, Canada. It celebrated the history of the Toronto waterfront, the history of commerce on the Great Lakes, and the role of maritime commerce in the development of the City of Toronto.

== History ==
The Toronto Maritime Museum was established in 1957 as the Marine Museum of Upper Canada. It was opened by its patron Earl Mountbatten of Burma on August 26, 1959. It was first located in the historic Stanley Barracks' Officers' Quarters on the grounds of the Canadian National Exhibition.

In 1964, it was proposed to display a selection of historic ships: the PS Trillium former island ferry, the Venetia a Chinese trader, the G. R. Geary steam tug, the Naiad yacht, and the St. Lawrence, a 100-gun gunboat that was sunk in Kingston, Ontario's harbour. The proposal was made by Guy Clarkson of the Ontario Economic Council to the Toronto City Council's Parks and Recreation Committee, which turned it down.

A collection of the city's maritime history including model ships was housed at the former military barracks. On the outside, the museum displayed the tugboat Ned Hanlan, along with a large ship anchor and screw. Although not related to the museum's purpose, ex-CN Rail / Canadian Northern Railway locomotive 6213 was stored outside.

In 2000, the museum was moved to Pier 4 at 245 Queens Quay West at a former warehouse (c. 1930s), which is closer to downtown, and more accessible for tourists. This facility was once a marine warehouse built in the 1930s. The museum featured a number of historic model ships. The museum site was operated by City of Toronto Culture Division.

Despite the relocation, the museum was closed in 2008 and there appears to be no active plan to restore the museum. The exhibits are currently in storage, and organizers are looking for funding.

The two outdoor displays were eventually relocated. CN Locomotive 6213 was transferred to the Toronto Railway Museum. Some restoration has taken place and is now stored indoors at the former roundhouse. Tugboat Ned Hanlan was relocated to Hanlan's Point Ferry Terminal on Toronto Islands in 2012. The Harbourfront building was repurposed for a pet activity centre and is currently a craft beer store and restaurant. The former barracks building is now part of the Hotel X Toronto project.

== Affiliations ==
The Museum was affiliated with the CMA, CHIN, and Virtual Museum of Canada.

== See also ==
- Harbourfront Centre
- Exhibition Place
- Maritime Museum of the Atlantic, Halifax, Nova Scotia
- Marine Museum of the Great Lakes, Kingston, Ontario
