= Ned Hanlan (tugboat) =

Coordinates: 43.627979°N 79.389402°W

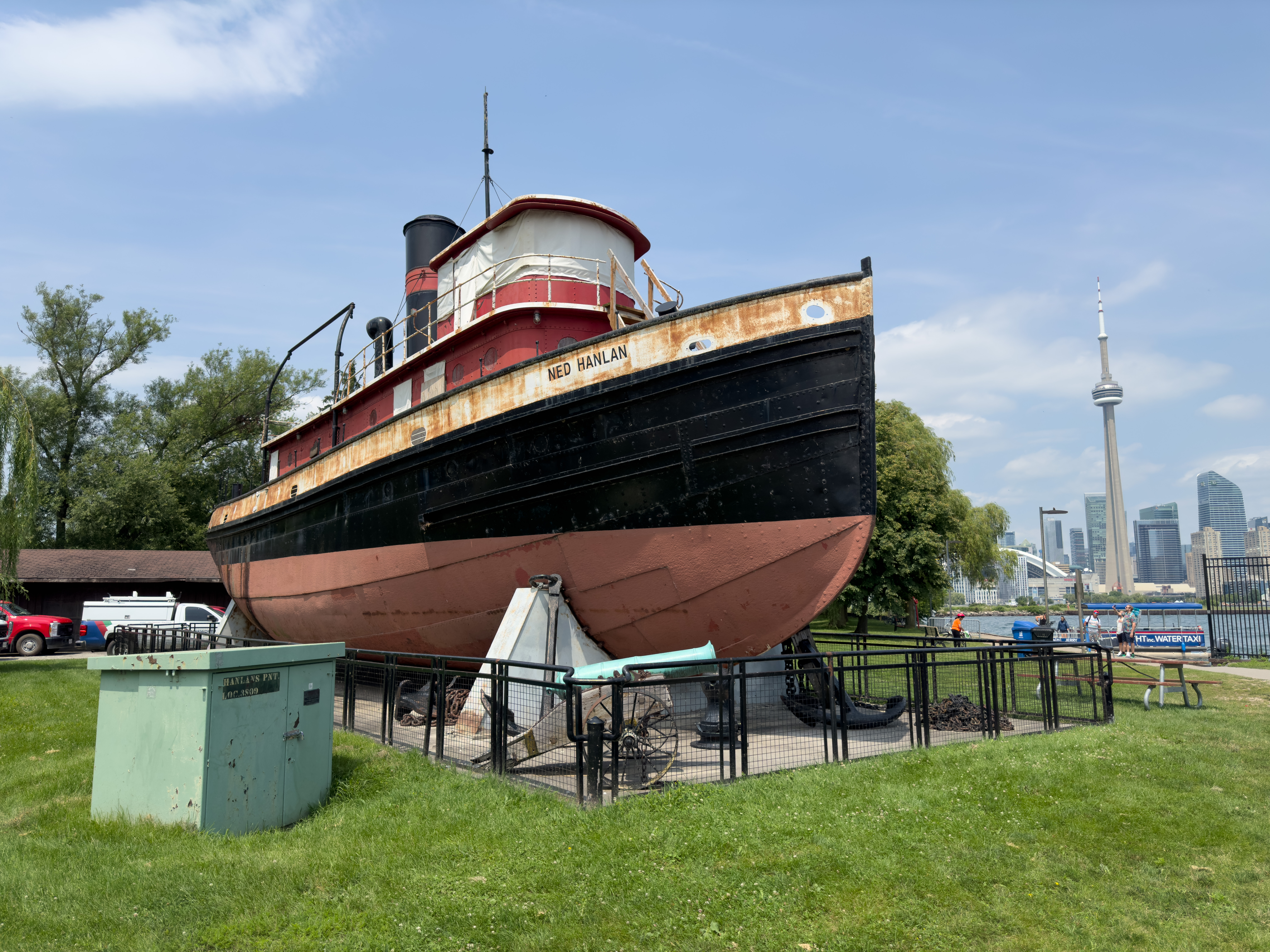

History

Canada
- Name: Ned Hanlan
- Owner: Toronto Transportation Commission
- Builder: Toronto Drydock Co., Toronto
- Launched: 1932
- In service: 1932
- Out of service: 1967
- Identification: IMO number: 5248396
- Status: Museum Ship, Toronto
- Notes: Steam-powered tugboat

General characteristics
- Tonnage: 105 t.
- Length: 74.8 ft.
- Beam: 19.1 ft.
- Height: 9 ft.
- Notes: museum ship on the grounds of the Canadian National Exhibition in Toronto, Ontario Canada 1971-2012; Hanlan's Point Ferry Terminal 2012-present

Ned Hanlan is a steam-powered tugboat that operated in Toronto Harbour in Toronto, Ontario, Canada. The tugboat entered service in 1932 and was retired in 1967. It was then put on display at Exhibition Place. It was moved in 2012 to Hanlan's Point on the Toronto Islands; it is named after champion rower Ned Hanlan.

== Tugboat ==
Ned Hanlan was built in 1932. She was designed by naval architect John Stephen for the City of Toronto Works Department. She was constructed in Toronto, in the Portlands district. Ned Hanlan was named after Ned Hanlan, a 19th-century Toronto resident, and world champion rower. She served as a tug for lake steamers, assisted in works project and acted as a backup island ferry between the island airport and the mainland.

== Static display ==
Ned Hanlan was retired in 1967 and remained moored in Toronto Harbour until 1971, when she was moved for a static display next to the Toronto Maritime Museum housed in the old Stanley Barracks' Officers' Quarters at Exhibition Place. In June 2012, the tugboat was moved to a new home on Hanlan's Point on the Toronto Islands.

Ned Hanlan is in reasonably good shape, with little rust, and a slight dent in her port gunwale just fore of the wheelhouse. The screw and rudder have been removed.

== Specifications ==
- Owner: Toronto Transportation Commission., 1932, Canada
- Builder: Toronto Dry Dock Co., 1932, Canada, Ontario, Toronto
- Engine Builder: John Inglis, 1932
- Year Built: 1932
- Year Engine Built: 1932
- Final Disposition: Exhibit ship in Toronto.
- Registry Number: C. 157362
- Hull Number: None
- Vessel Type: Tug and Ferry
- Length: 74.8 feet (22.8 m)
- Width: 19.1 feet (5.8 m).
- Height: 9 feet (2.7 m)
- Gross Tonnage: 105 tonnes (105,000 kg)
- Net Tonnage: 64 tonnes (64,000 kg)
- Materials: Steel
- Engine Type: Fore and Aft
- Piston #1: 13 inches (33 cm)
- Piston #2: 26 inches (66 cm)
- Stroke Length: 18 inches (46 cm)

== Ned Hanlan II ==
Another tug in Toronto operates as Ned Hanlan. The tug Ned Hanlan II is a Toronto Works Department tug. This boat was originally owned by Toronto Police Service.

== See also ==
- Museum ship
- List of museum ships
- Ship replica
- Ships preserved in museums
