= Hotel X Toronto =

Hotel and sports complex in Toronto, Ontario

- by Library Hotel Collection
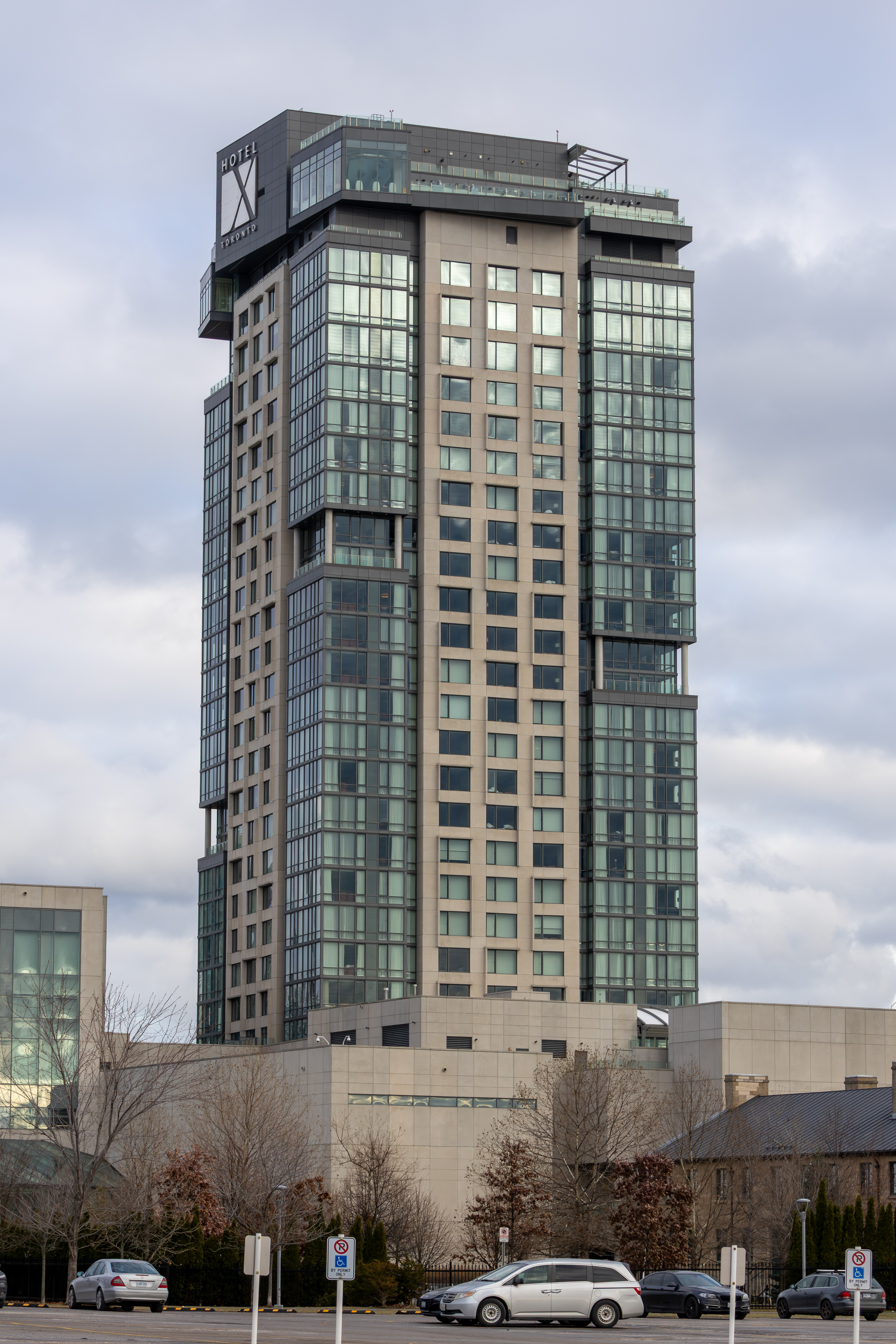
- Hotel X in December 2025
- Interactive map of the Hotel X Toronto area
- Hotel chain: Library Hotel Collection

General information
- Type: Hotel and sports complex
- Location: Exhibition Place, 111 Princes' Boulevard, Toronto, Ontario, Canada
- Coordinates: 43.6331°N 79.4121°W
- Opened: March 20, 2018
- Owner: Princes Gate Hotel, LP

Technical details
- Floor count: 30 (main tower); 4 (sports club)

Design and construction
- Architecture firm: Norr Limited, Architects, Engineers and Planners
- Other designers: Stephen B. Jacobs Group; Andi Pepper Interior Design

Other information
- Number of rooms: 404
- Facilities: Meeting Rooms, 2 Ballrooms, Cinema, Screening Room, 3-Level SkyBar, Year Round Rooftop Pool, Art Gallery, Squash and Tennis courts
- Parking: 411 spaces underground

Website
- hotelxtoronto.com

References
- "Hotel X Toronto Fact Sheet". Hotel X.

Hotel X Toronto is a hotel and sports club complex on the grounds of Exhibition Place in Toronto, Ontario, Canada. The hotel, part of the Library Hotel Collection, is intended to serve visitors attending conventions, meetings, and trade shows booked at the adjacent Enercare Centre and the Beanfield Centre. Hotel X Toronto is divided into three parts: the hotel tower, the Ten X Toronto (10XTO) athletic facility and the historic Stanley Barracks Officers' Quarters and foundations.

== Description ==
The hotel complex is composed of two buildings: a thirty-storey main tower and a five-storey sports club building. The overall design was done by NORR Architects of Toronto, with architecture and interior design services provided by Stephen B. Jacobs Group and Andi Pepper Interior Design of New York. The original design of the building, then known as "Hotel in the Garden", was by Toronto architect Rocco Maragna. It was completely redesigned by NORR to gain the approval of the City of Toronto government's Design Review Panel in 2012. The main entrance is located at the corner of Newfoundland Road and Lake Shore Boulevard West.

== Project history ==
The site was forested land when settlement by the British began around 1800. After the War of 1812, the land was cleared by the British military as a "Garrison Reserve" to support the garrison known today as Fort York. The site was used for marching, target practice, horse training and temporary campgrounds. As the 1810s era Fort York buildings aged, new facilities were built outside the fort on the Garrison Reserve. The New Fort York, known now as the Stanley Barracks, was built on the current hotel site. During the 1800s, as Toronto grew, sections of the Garrison Reserve were transferred to other uses. The northern section became the site for a jail and an asylum. In the 1850s, a new east-west rail line was constructed along the northern boundary. The western half of the reserve became the new Exhibition Grounds for the Toronto Industrial Exhibition (the future Canadian National Exhibition (CNE)). The Canadian military would use the Exhibition Grounds for various purposes during World War I and World War II and then vacated the site, turning it over entirely to the City of Toronto. One building, the former Officers' Quarters building, continues to exist and is next to the hotel. The other military buildings on the site were all demolished. The Officers' Quarters was used as the Toronto Maritime Museum for several decades. The area was used for surface parking, outdoor exhibit space and midway during the CNE.

After the Direct Energy Centre (now known as "Enercare Centre") opened in 1997, Exhibition Place management sought to build facilities complementary to its large exhibitions space: meeting rooms and accommodations, that would make the facility more attractive to convention planners. A hotel was first proposed for the site in 1999, but three attempts to get the project started failed. While the hotel project failed to get off the ground, meeting rooms were added with the installation of the Allstream Centre meeting facility in the Automotive Building, adjacent to the Direct Energy Centre. In 2008, HK Hotels (later becoming Library Hotel Collection) won the bid to build and operate a hotel on the site. Final agreement on a 49-year lease between HK and the City came in 2009, after issues surrounding archaeological issues and the Stanley Barracks were sorted out. Ownership changed when Library Hotels sold a stake in the project to billionaire Alexander Rovt for US$50 million.

Construction began in 2013. Contaminated soil was found on the site, which delayed construction as it was identified and removed at a cost of CA$5 million, paid for by the City. Colder than normal winters also slowed construction, as the building was hoped to be complete in time for the 2015 Pan American Games. The building was topped off on April 23, 2015. In 2016, construction was halted by contractors who placed liens on the building. This included a CA$32 million lien and a CA$17 million lien by Multiplex Construction who was replaced by McKay-Cocker Construction Limited. The hotel eventually opened in March 2018.

There is a proposal to build an above-ground pedestrian bridge between the Hotel X and the second floor of the Automotive Building. It may begin construction in 2020.

== See also ==
- Hotels in Toronto
