= Hotel Elysée =

Hotel in Manhattan, New York

Coordinates: 40.7599°N 73.9732°W

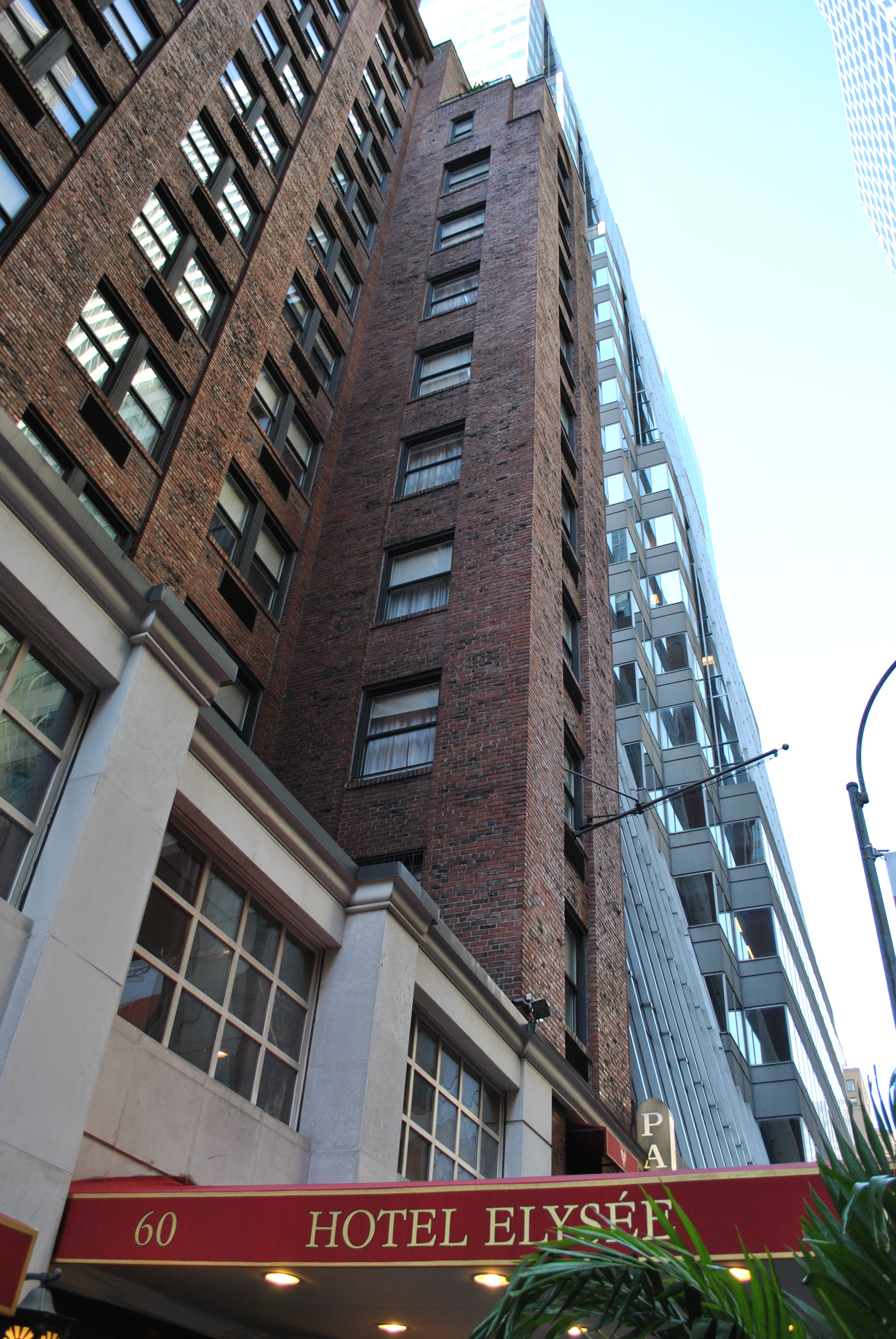
The hotel's frontage on 54th Street

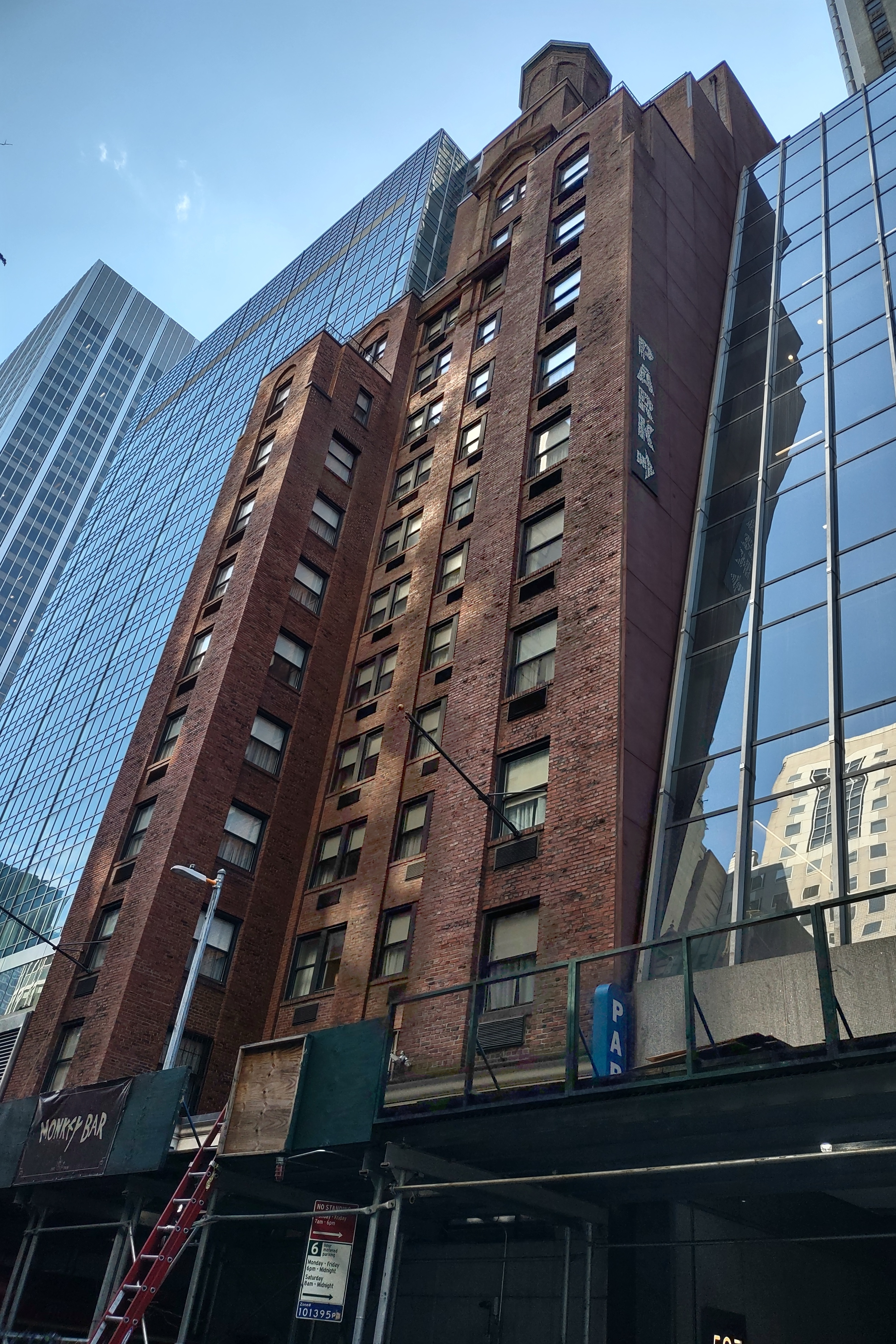
View of the exterior in 2023

Hotel Elysée is a hotel at 60 East 54th Street (between Madison and Park Avenues) in Midtown Manhattan, New York City. The hotel was established by Swiss-born Max Haering in 1926 as a European-style hotel for the "carriage trade".

New York's leading hatcheck concessionaire, Mayer Quain, purchased the hotel out of bankruptcy in 1937. After World War II, his children eclectically designed every room so that no two rooms were alike. In lieu of traditional numbers, the rooms were named to reflect their personality, such as the "Sayonara" suite that was assigned to Marlon Brando after his starring role in Teahouse of the August Moon.

Columnist Jimmy Breslin, who regards the Elysée as "a great hotel, a genuine New York landmark," succeeded Ruark as the hotel's unofficial chronicler.

In November 1948, Tallulah Bankhead celebrated President Harry S. Truman's victory over Thomas E. Dewey in the 1948 United States presidential election by throwing a noisy party at the hotel that ran non-stop for five days and nights.

The hotel is now part of Henry Kallan's Library Hotel Collection.

== The Monkey Bar ==
The Elysée is known for the Monkey Bar, a piano bar just off the lobby. Opened in the 1940s, it became known to the cognoscenti as "the place to go where jokes die," especially off-color jokes and double-entendre songs spun by such performers as Johnny Payne (1934-1964), Marion Page (1950-1965) and Mel Martin (1945-1983). Johnny Andrews played the piano at cocktail hour for over 50 years (1936-1990).

Starting out as just another dimly-lit hotel piano bar with mirrored paneling, the tiny room was expanded in the early 1950s, when the mirrors were replaced by wraparound hand-painted mural by caricaturist Charlie Vella. Eight more monkeys were added to the bar mural in 1984 by artist Diana Voyentzie "to remind customers of their behaviour." In 1995, when the bar was redesigned by the architect David Rockwell, all of the monkeys were unified by Voyentzie with more monkeys, along with palm trees and foliage.

In 2009, the Monkey Bar underwent a restoration that included a new dining-room mural by illustrator Edward Sorel, depicting prominent figures of the Jazz Age.
