= Bournemouth Air Festival =

Annual air show in the United Kingdom

Bournemouth Air Show
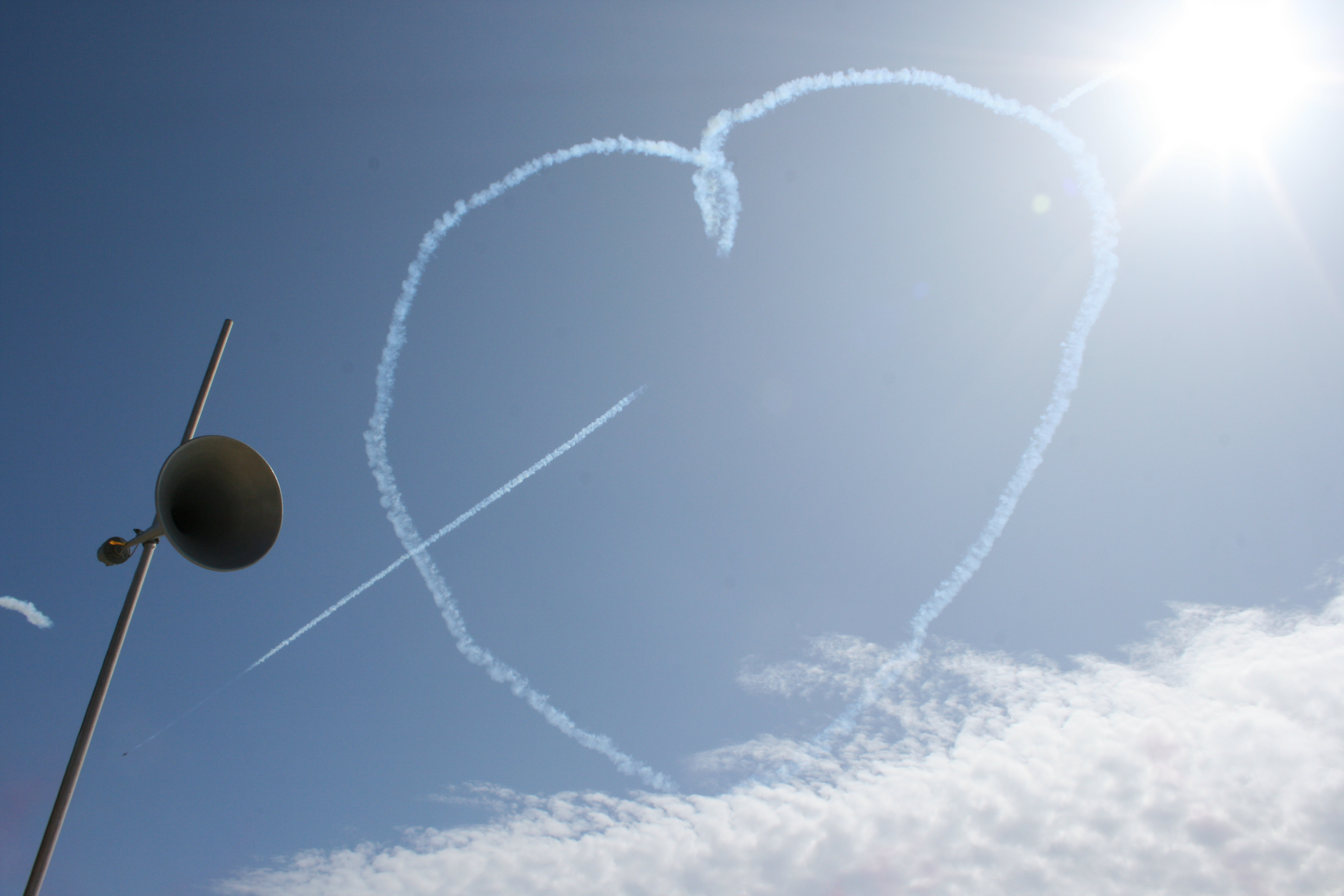
- RAF Red Arrows Aerobatic Display Team performing their cupid formation at The Bournemouth Air Festival 2009.
- Genre: Air show
- Dates: 3–4 days in August/September
- Begins: Thursday
- Ends: Saturday
- Frequency: Annually
- Venue: Bournemouth Beach Area, Bournemouth Gardens
- Location: Bournemouth
- Coordinates: 50°43′12″N 1°52′48″W
- Country: United Kingdom
- Years active: 2008 – 2024
- Established: 28–31 August 2008
- Previous event: 29–31 August 2024
- Attendance: > than 600,000 (2022)
- Major events: Aerobatic displays
- Organiser: Bournemouth, Christchurch and Poole Council

The Bournemouth Air Festival was an annual air show held along the coast at Bournemouth, in Dorset, England. It featured aircraft from the Royal Air Force and the Royal Navy, as well as civil aviation displays. Since its formation in 2008, the festival claimed to have entertained over ten million people.

The festival usually took place in late August, over four days including dusk and night air displays with live music. It was organised by Bournemouth, Christchurch and Poole Council (BCP Council), and was estimated to generate about £30 million of trade annually for local businesses.

The 2024 show was the last to be organised and funded by BCP Council, at a cost of £248,000. The event did not take place in 2025 and 2026, with no definite future plans though the council is open to receiving applications for restarting it.

== Event layout ==
The festival was free to visit with a 1.5-mile festival site between Bournemouth and Boscombe piers. The RAF Village was on the East Overcliff. The Royal Navy village, with the British Army and Royal Marines, was on the beach, with vehicles, have-a-go equipment and personnel to speak to.

== History ==
The festival started in 2008, being held from Thursday 28 August to Sunday 31 August.

Year	Dates	Estimated Attendance (all days)	Notes
2008	28–31 August	750,000	The first display to perform at the festival was the RAF Battle of Britain Memorial Flight. The Vulcan was scheduled to fly, however, didn't. The Red Arrows performed on three days of the event, with more than 200,000 people on the Bournemouth beaches to watch their first display on the Friday of the event. The display started with a commemorative flypast between the Red Arrows and a restored Folland Gnat, the previous aircraft the Red Arrows used from 1964 – 1979, before moving to the BAE Systems Hawk T1A, which they still use today. The first festival attracted 750,000 people.
2009	20–23 August	1.3million	
2010	19–22 August	Unknown	The festival was the first air show to have flying during the hours of dusk, with air displays featuring LEDs and fireworks.
2011	18–21 August	Unknown	During the 2011 Air Festival, Flight Lieutenant Jon Egging, a Royal Air Force pilot on the Red Arrows aerobatics display team, died after crashing into a field in Throop, Dorset after a display at the festival.
2012	30 August – 2 September	964,000	
2013	29 August – 1 September	Unknown	
2014	28–31 August	812,000	
2015	20–23 August	750,000	Due to bad weather conditions on the first day of the festival, flying was cancelled on the first day. When flying did take place, the airshow saw one of the last flights of the Avro Vulcan, sometimes called "the most famous aircraft in Britain".
2016	18–21 August	700,000	
2017	30 August – 2 September	Unknown	Flying was cancelled on the final day of the festival due to adverse weather of 'strong cross-winds, low visibility and forecast rain'.
2018	30 August – 2 September	1million	
2019	29 August – 1 September	812,000	
2020	21–23 August	NA	Due to the COVID-19 pandemic, the usual festival did not occur, however, a virtual version did, featuring presentations, music and footage from past air displays.
2021	2–5 September	800,000	The festival was the only event in the world where The Red Arrows performed over four consecutive days. Flying was suspended after a biplane involved in the airshow crashed into Poole Harbour.
2022	1–4 September	600,000	
2023	31 August – 3 September	600,000	Flying between 14:00 and 16:00 BST on the first day of the festival was cancelled due to adverse weather conditions. All the displays in the evening were later further cancelled.
2024	29–31 August	500,000	The 2024 edition of the festival was shortened to 3 days and benefitted from good weather. The Red Arrows did not display on any of the days due to their Canadian tour.

== Aircraft ==
A number of aircraft have been involved over various displays, including:

Act	Aircraft	Registration	Information	Photo
AeroSuperBatics Wingwalkers	Boeing–Stearman A75N1 (PT17)	N707TJ	They were previously branded Breitling 'Swiss Chronographs' (performing as The Breitling Wingwalkers, 2011 to 2018) in accordance with their sponsorship agreement with the Swiss watch manufacturer Breitling. They are the worlds only formation wingwalking team.	
Avro Vulcan	B.2 XH558 The Spirit of Great Britain	G-VLCN	A jet-powered, tailless, delta-wing, high-altitude, strategic bomber, which was operated by the Royal Air Force (RAF) from 1956 until 1984. After retirement by the RAF, one example, B.2 XH558, named The Spirit of Great Britain, was restored for use in display flights and air shows. B.2 XH558 flew for the last time in October 2015 and is also being kept in taxiable condition	
B-17G 'Sally B'	Boeing B-17G Flying Fortress	G-BEDF	At 78 years old, G-BEDF is the only airworthy B-17 based in Europe, as well as one of three B-17s preserved in the United Kingdom. The aircraft is presently based at the Imperial War Museum Duxford, in eastern England. Sally B flies at airshows in the UK and across Europe as well as serving as an airborne memorial to the United States Army Air Forces airmen who lost their lives in the European theatre during World War II.	
North American B-25 Mitchell	North American B-25 Mitchell		An American medium bomber that was introduced in 1941 and named in honor of Brigadier General William "Billy" Mitchell, a pioneer of U.S. military aviation. Used by many Allied air forces, the B-25 served in every theater of World War II, and after the war ended, many remained in service, operating across four decades.	
Battle of Britain Memorial Flight	Dakota, Lancaster, Spitfire and Hurricane Supermarine Spitfire Hawker Hurricane Mk IIc PZ865		The Battle of Britain Memorial Flight (BBMF) is a Royal Air Force flight which provides an aerial display group usually comprising an Avro Lancaster, a Supermarine Spitfire and a Hawker Hurricane. The flight is administratively part of No. 1 Group RAF, operating out of RAF Coningsby in Lincolnshire.	
Wildcat Demo Team (Black Cats)	AgustaWestland Wildcat HMA.2		The Wildcat Demo Team (Black Cats) are the Royal Navy's helicopter display team. The team is composed of two AgustaWestland Wildcat HMA.2 anti-submarine and anti-shipping helicopters, with the aircraft and crews drawn from 825 Naval Air Squadron based at RNAS Yeovilton in Somerset.	
Breitling Jet Team	Aero L-39 Albatros		The Breitling Jet Team was the largest civilian aerobatic display team in Europe. Based in Dijon, France, it flew seven Aero L-39 Albatros jets. The team flew a display lasting 18–20 minutes that included formation flying, opposition passes, solo routines, and synchronized maneuvers.	
Bristol Blenheim			A British light bomber designed and built by the Bristol Aeroplane Company, which was used extensively in the first two years of the Second World War, with examples still being used as trainers until the end of the war.	
Canadair T-33 Silver Star	Lockheed T-33		A Canadian license-built version of the Lockheed T-33, the Canadian version is powered by the Rolls-Royce Nene 10 turbojet, whereas the Lockheed production used the Allison J33.	
Chinook Display Team	Boeing CH-47 Chinook		The Chinook Display Team is an aerobatics display team in the Royal Air Force based at RAF Odiham. The team flies the UK variant Boeing CH-47 Chinook, and is composed of volunteers from front-line aircrew who train and execute air show performances between day-to-day primary military operations.	
Eurofighter Typhoon Display Team	Eurofighter Typhoon		The Eurofighter Typhoon is a European multinational twin-engine, canard delta wing, multirole fighter. The Typhoon was designed originally as an air-superiority fighter	
Fairey Swordfish			The Fairey Swordfish is a biplane torpedo bomber, designed by the Fairey Aviation Company. Originating in the early 1930s, the Swordfish, nicknamed "Stringbag", was principally operated by the Fleet Air Arm of the Royal Navy. It was also used by the Royal Air Force (RAF), as well as several overseas operators, including the Royal Canadian Air Force (RCAF) and the Royal Netherlands Navy. It was initially operated primarily as a fleet attack aircraft. During its later years, the Swordfish was increasingly used as an anti-submarine and training platform. The type was in frontline service throughout the Second World War.	
Fireflies				
Gerald Cooper Xtreme Air XA41	XtremeAir Sbach 300		The XtremeAir Sbach 300 is a German aerobatic aircraft, designed by Philippe Steinbach and produced by XtremeAir, of Cochstedt. The aircraft is supplied as a complete ready-to-fly-aircraft.	
Hawker Hurricane	Hawker Hurricane Mk X Hawker Sea Fury T.20		The Hawker Hurricane is a British single-seat fighter aircraft of the 1930s–40s which was designed and predominantly built by Hawker Aircraft Ltd. for service with the Royal Air Force (RAF). The Hawker Sea Fury is a British fighter aircraft designed and manufactured by Hawker Aircraft. It was the last propeller-driven fighter to serve with the Royal Navy, and one of the fastest production single reciprocating engine aircraft ever built. Developed during the Second World War, the Sea Fury entered service two years after the war ended. It proved to be a popular aircraft with a number of overseas militaries and was used during the Korean War in the early 1950s, and by the Cuban air force during the 1961 Bay of Pigs Invasion.	
Hispano	Hispano Buchón 'Black 8' Hispano HA-1112-M4L Buchón 'White 9'	G-AWHH (Hispano HA-1112-M4L Buchón 'White 9')		Hispano Buchón 'Black 8'
J-3 Cub (with fireworks)			The Piper J-3 Cub is an American light aircraft that was built between 1938 and 1947 by Piper Aircraft. The aircraft has a simple, lightweight design which gives it good low-speed handling properties and short-field performance. The Cub is Piper Aircraft's most-produced model, with nearly 20,000 built in the United States. Its simplicity, affordability and popularity invokes comparisons to the Ford Model T automobile.	
Jet Provost T.5			The BAC Jet Provost is a British jet trainer aircraft that was in use with the Royal Air Force (RAF) from 1955 to 1993.	
MiG-15			The Mikoyan-Gurevich MiG-15 is a jet fighter aircraft developed by Mikoyan-Gurevich for the Soviet Union. The MiG-15 was one of the first successful jet fighters to incorporate swept wings to achieve high transonic speeds. In aerial combat during the Korean War, it outclassed straight-winged jet day fighters, which were largely relegated to ground-attack roles. In response to the MiG-15's appearance and in order to counter it, the United States Air Force rushed the North American F-86 Sabre to Korea.	
Otto the Helicopter	Schweizer S300		A light utility helicopter originally produced by Hughes Helicopters, as a development of the Hughes 269. The single, three-bladed main rotor and piston-powered S300 is mostly used as a cost-effective platform for training and agriculture.	
P-51 Mustang	North American P-51 Mustang 'Contrary Mary' P-51D Mustang 'Miss Helen'		The North American Aviation P-51 Mustang is an American long-range, single-seat fighter and fighter-bomber used during World War II and the Korean War, among other conflicts. Following combat experience the P-51D series introduced a "teardrop", or "bubble", canopy to rectify problems with poor visibility to the rear of the aircraft.	
Boeing P-8A Poseidon	Boeing P-8A Poseidon		The Boeing P-8 Poseidon is an American maritime patrol and reconnaissance aircraft developed and produced by Boeing Defense, Space & Security, and derived from the civilian Boeing 737-800. It was developed for the United States Navy (USN) and is used by a number of countries armed forces. The P-8 operates in anti-submarine warfare (ASW), anti-surface warfare (ASUW), and intelligence, surveillance and reconnaissance (ISR) roles. It is armed with torpedoes, Harpoon anti-ship missiles, and other weapons, can drop and monitor sonobuoys, and can operate in conjunction with other assets, including the Northrop Grumman MQ-4C Triton maritime surveillance unmanned aerial vehicle (UAV). It was the second engagement in the UK of the year for the aircraft, flown by the US Navy at the 2019 festival.	
Pitts S2S	Pitts Special	G-JPIT	The Pitts Special (company designations S-1 and S-2) is a series of light aerobatic biplanes designed by Curtis Pitts. It has accumulated many competition wins since its first flight in 1944. The Pitts biplanes dominated world aerobatic competition in the 1960s and 1970s and, even today, remain potent competition aircraft in the lower categories.	Pitts Specials ‘G-SWON’ & ‘G-STUI’
RAF Tucano	Short Tucano		The Short Tucano is a two-seat turboprop basic trainer built by Short Brothers in Belfast, Northern Ireland. It is a licence-built version of the Brazilian Embraer EMB 312 Tucano.	
Red Arrows	BAE Systems Hawk		The Red Arrows, officially known as the Royal Air Force Aerobatic Team, is the aerobatics display team of the Royal Air Force (RAF) based at RAF Waddington. The team was formed in late 1964 as an all-RAF team, replacing a number of unofficial teams that had been sponsored by RAF commands.	A BAE Systems Hawk in Red Arrows livery. The aircraft photographed is the one Jon Egging was flying when he crashed at the 2011 Festival.
Republic P47 Thunderbolt 'Nellie'	Republic P-47 Thunderbolt		The Republic P-47 Thunderbolt is a World War II-era fighter aircraft produced by the American company Republic Aviation from 1941 through 1945. It was a successful high-altitude fighter, and it also served as the foremost American fighter-bomber in the ground-attack role. Its primary armament was eight .50-caliber machine guns, and it could carry 5-inch rockets or a bomb load of 2,500 lb (1,100 kg). When fully loaded, the P-47 weighed up to 8 tons, making it one of the heaviest fighters of the war.	
Saab J35 Draken	Saab J35 Draken		The Saab 35 Draken (IPA: [²drɑːkɛn]; 'The Kite' or 'The Dragon') is a Swedish fighter-interceptor developed and manufactured by Svenska Aeroplan Aktiebolaget (SAAB) between 1955 and 1974. It was the first Western European-built combat aircraft with true supersonic capability to enter service and the first fully supersonic aircraft to be deployed in Western Europe. Designwise it was one of, if not the first, combat aircraft designed with double delta wings, being drawn up by early 1950. The unconventional wing design also had the side effect of making it the first known aircraft to be capable of and perform the Cobra maneuver. It was also one of the first Western-European-built aircraft to exceed Mach 2 in level flight, reaching it on 14 January 1960.	
Saab 37 Viggen	Saab SK37E Viggen		The Saab 37 Viggen (The Tufted Duck, ambiguous with The Thunderbolt) is a single-seat, single-engine multirole combat aircraft designed and produced by the Swedish aircraft manufacturer Saab. It was the first canard-equipped aircraft to be produced in quantity and the first to carry an airborne digital central computer with integrated circuits for its avionics, arguably making it the most modern/advanced combat aircraft in Europe at the time of introduction. The digital central computer was the first of its kind in the world, automating and taking over tasks previously requiring a navigator/copilot, facilitating handling in tactical situations where, among other things, high speeds and short decision times determined whether attacks would be successful or not, a system not surpassed until the introduction of the Panavia Tornado into operational service in 1981.	
Great War Display Team	Six WW1 Fighters		The Great War Display Team (GWDT) started out in 1988 and was originally called The Wombats. It was an ad-hoc collection of aircraft including five SE5as, two Fokker Dr.Is and a Fokker D7, many of them flown by their builders.	
Firefly's	Slingsby T67 Firefly		The Slingsby T67 Firefly, originally produced as the Fournier RF-6, is a two-seat aerobatic training aircraft, built by Slingsby Aviation in Kirkbymoorside, Yorkshire, England.	
Supermarine Spitfire	Supermarine Spitfire Mk IXb Supermarine Spitfire Mk1XT 'Grace' G-LFIX 'ML407' Supermarine Spitfire TR IX Supermarine Spitfire X1X PS853 Vickers Supermarine Spitfire X1X PS853 – G-RRGN	G-RRGN (Spitfire X1X PS853) G-LFIX ('Grace' Spitfire Mk1XT 'ML407') G-RRGN (Vickers Supermarine Spitfire X1X PS853) G-IBSY (Supermarine Spitfire Mk Vc 'EE602')	The Supermarine Spitfire is a British single-seat fighter aircraft used by the Royal Air Force and other Allied countries before, during, and after World War II. Many variants of the Spitfire were built, from the Mk 1 to the Rolls-Royce Griffon-engined Mk 24 using several wing configurations and guns. It was the only British fighter produced continuously throughout the war.	
Strikemaster Pair	BAC Strikemaster	G-SOAF G-RSAF	The BAC 167 Strikemaster is a British jet-powered training and light attack aircraft. It was a development of the Hunting Jet Provost trainer, itself a jet engined version of the Percival Provost, which originally flew in 1950 with a radial piston engine.	
Team Raven	Van's Aircraft RV-8		The Van's RV-8 is a tandem two-seat, single-engine, low-wing homebuilt aircraft sold in kit form by Van's Aircraft. The RV-8 is equipped with conventional landing gear, while the RV-8A version features tricycle landing gear. The design is similar to the earlier RV-4, although it is larger than that earlier model.	
The Blades	Extra 300LPs and an Extra 330SC		The Blades were a British civilian aerobatic team based at the Sywell Aerodrome in Northamptonshire. They had been described as "the world's only aerobatic airline" and were the only full-time civilian aerobatic team in the United Kingdom. The Blades were a subsidiary of 2Excel Aviation. The team was founded in 2005 by Andy Offer, a former leader of the Red Arrows, and Chris Norton, a Royal Air Force wing commander.	
Tigers Parachute Display Team	NA	NA	The Tigers Army Parachute Display Team is a freefall parachute team of the British Army. The unit was formed in South Cambridgeshire in 1986 under the Queen's Division.	
Twisters	Silence Twister		The Silence Twister is a German ultralight designed by Silence Aircraft for amateur construction, either from plans or kits. The prototype first flew on 30 September 2000.	
'Take on Gravity' jetsuits				
Vampires FB.52 and T.55	De Havilland Vampire FB.52 and T.55		The de Havilland Vampire is a British jet fighter which was developed and manufactured by the de Havilland Aircraft Company. It was the second jet fighter to be operated by the RAF, after the Gloster Meteor, and the first to be powered by a single jet engine.	
Yakolevs			The JSC A.S. Yakovlev Design Bureau (Russian: ОАО Опытно-конструкторское бюро им. А.С. Яковлева) is a Russian aircraft designer and manufacturer (design office prefix Yak). Its head office is in Aeroport District, Northern Administrative Okrug, Moscow.	

== Incidents ==
=== 2011 flash flooding ===
The first day of the 2011 festival was cancelled due to severe flooding, where 50mm of rain fell. Between 10:00 and 11:00 BST, 35mm of rain fell.

=== 2011 Red Arrows crash ===
During the 2011 Air Festival, Flight Lieutenant Jon Egging, a Royal Air Force pilot on the Red Arrows aerobatics display team, died after crashing into a field in Throop, Dorset. The incident occurred after a display at festival when the Red Arrows were returning to Bournemouth International Airport. It was determined that Flt Lt Egging was incapacitated due to the effects of g-force induced loss of consciousness until very shortly before impact.Egging was the first Red Arrows pilot to die in an aircraft crash in the 21st century, since Flt Lt Neil Duncan MacLachlan, in 1988.

=== 2018 'jet suit' ditching ===
During a demonstration of a jet suit made by Gravity Industries, the pilot, Dr Angelo Grubisic landed in the sea, having only just taken off. He was not injured but brought to shore by lifeguards.

=== 2021 Boeing A75N1 (PT17) Stearman biplane crash ===
During the 2021 festival, a Boeing A75N1 (PT17) Stearman biplane, that had performed as part of the AeroSuperBatics wing-walking display at the festival, crashed into the sea in Poole Harbour. The aircraft suffered a loss of power during the display, causing the pilot, David Barrell, to abort the performance and fly away from the festival site, before ditching into the sea. The pilot and Kirsten Pobjoy, who was wing-walking, suffered minor injuries. The footage of the crash was captured on CCTV from the nearby Haven Hotel. It was discovered the cause of the accident was oil being prevented from reaching the engine by metal strap supporting an oil pipe failing. AeroSuperBatics returned to fly during the 2022 festival.

=== 2022 drone seizures ===
During the first day of the 2022 festival, Dorset Police seized three drones after they were flown in restricted airspace.Restricted airspace is governed by the Civilian Aviation Authority (CAA) Air Navigation Order 2016, specifically Article 241 (endangering the safety of any person or property).

=== 2023 nearby murder investigation ===
Prior to the 2023 festival, Dorset Police launched an unrelated murder investigation to the festival, after human remains were found nearby to the festival site. As a result of enquiries, two people were arrested and as of January 2024, they are awaiting trial. An access route to the beach was cordoned off as part of the investigation. Organisers of the festival liaised with Dorset Police regarding the investigation, stating they would make 'any minor changes to our organisational arrangements' if they were required. The original cordon remained in place throughout the festival and the festival was unaffected.

== See also ==
- Bournemouth Aviation Museum
- List of air show accidents and incidents in the 21st century
