= Nikolay Ushmaev =

Soviet parachutist and paraglider

Honoured Master of Sports of Russia Nikolay Ushmaev
Personal information
- Native name: Russian: Николай Павлович Ушмаев
- Full name: Nikolay Pavlovich Ushmaev
- National team: Soviet Union
- Born: 13 May 1946 (age 80) Stavropol, Russian SFSR, Soviet Union
- Years active: 1965-1993
- Spouse: Russian: Людмила Петровна Ушмаева

Sport
- Country: Soviet Union
- Sport: Parachuting, Paragliding, Skydiving
- Team: National Parachuting Team

Achievements and titles
- World finals: 1974 World Allround Parachuting Champion, 1980 World Allround Parachuting Champion
- National finals: Triple USSR Allround Parachuting Champion
Medal record
Gold medal – first place	1974 Szolnok, Hungary	Overall Individual Style and Accuracy
Gold medal – first place	1980 Kazanlak, Bulgaria	Overall Individual Style and Accuracy

External images
- Photo of Nikolay Ushmaev
- Just Landed
- At home, 2014
- Medals

Nikolay Pavlovich Ushmaev (born 13 May 1946) is the legendary man of the Soviet classical parachuting and a pioneer of paragliding in the USSR. The first in the history of parachuting became a two-time absolute world champion. He participated in nine world parachuting championships, where he became world champion nine times. Nikolay made over 13,000+ parachute jumps, and set 33 world records and 55 Soviet Union records in parachuting. The only 5-time world champion in aerial acrobatics and the only Soviet parachutist represented USSR at the opening of the Olympics in Seoul in 1988.

Nikolay won the gold medal in Men's Overall Individual Style and Accuracy at the XV World Parachuting Championships in Kazanlak, Bulgaria in 1980, and the gold medal in Men's Overall Individual Style and Accuracy at the XII World Parachuting Championships in Szolnok, Hungary in 1974
Triple All-round USSR Champion;
Honoured Master of Sports of the USSR.
