= Tiger (comics) =

Tiger is the name of several fictional characters in comics. Characters include:

- Tiger (Image Comics), an Image Comics character who has appeared in Savage Dragon
- Tiger (Wildstorm), a Wildstorm character who has appeared in Gen^{13}
- Bronze Tiger, a DC Comics martial artist
- Flying Tiger (disambiguation)#Entertainment, a number of comics characters
- Smiling Tiger, a Marvel Comics supervillain
- Tiger-Man, an Atlas/Seaboard Comics character
- Tiger Shark (Marvel Comics), a Marvel Comics supervillain
- White Tiger (comics), a number of Marvel Comics characters

== See also ==
- Tiger (disambiguation)
- Tigress (comics)
- Tiger (Fleetway), a British comic
- Tiger (comic strip), an American comic strip
