= Flying Tigers (disambiguation) =

The Flying Tigers was the nickname of the 1st American Volunteer Group, a unit of the Chinese Air Force in 1941–1942 composed of volunteer pilots from the United States.

Flying Tigers or Flying Tiger may also refer to:

== Businesses ==
- Flying Tiger Line, a cargo airline
- Flying Tiger Copenhagen, a Danish retailer chain

== Entertainment ==
- Flying Tigers (film), a 1942 movie starring John Wayne
- Flying Tiger (DC Comics), a DC comics character
- Flying Tiger (Marvel Comics), a comic-book character
- Flying Tigers (album), a 2011 album by heavy metal band White Wizzard
- Flying Tigers, a fictional team of pilots in the comic series Buck Danny
- Flying Tigers (game), a 1969 board wargame of aerial combat
- Flying Tigers: Shadows Over China, a 2017 video game
- Flying Tiger 2, a 2019 crime drama television series
- Baa Baa Black Sheep, an American TV series translated into Spanish as Los Tigres Voladores (The Flying Tigers)
- Major Dell Conway of the Flying Tigers, an American TV series
- The Flying Tigers (band), a short-lived American rock band made up of Ryan Martin, Gary Benson, and Dorian Heartsong.

== Law enforcement ==
- Special Duties Unit, tactical unit of the Hong Kong Police Force
- Helicopter Unit, Beijing Special Weapons and Tactics Unit, Ministry of Public Security of the People's Republic of China

== Military units ==
- 23d Fighter Group, a United States Air Force unit which absorbed the 1st AVG
- Chinese-American Composite Wing (Provisional), a joint United States Army Air Force and Chinese (ROC) Air Force unit
- 2/229th Aviation Regiment "Flying Tigers", United States Army
- HMH-361 (Marine Heavy Helicopter Squadron 361), United States Marine Corps
- HMM-262 (Medium Helicopter Squadron 262), United States Marine Corps
- 102 Squadron (Israel), Israeli Air Force
- 814 Naval Air Squadron, Royal Navy Fleet Air Arm
- Flying Tigers Freefall Parachute Display Team, based in north Germany

== Sports ==
- Xinjiang Flying Tigers, a professional basketball team based in Ürümqi, Xinjiang, China
- Yunnan Flying Tigers F.C., a professional football club based in Lijiang, Yunnan, China
- Lakeland Flying Tigers, a minor league affiliate of the Detroit Tigers in Lakeland, Florida, United States
- Hagersville RCAF Flying Tigers, a team in the Ontario Armed Services Football League - see 1944 in Canadian football
