= Tigers Army Parachute Display Team =

The Tigers Army Parachute Display Team
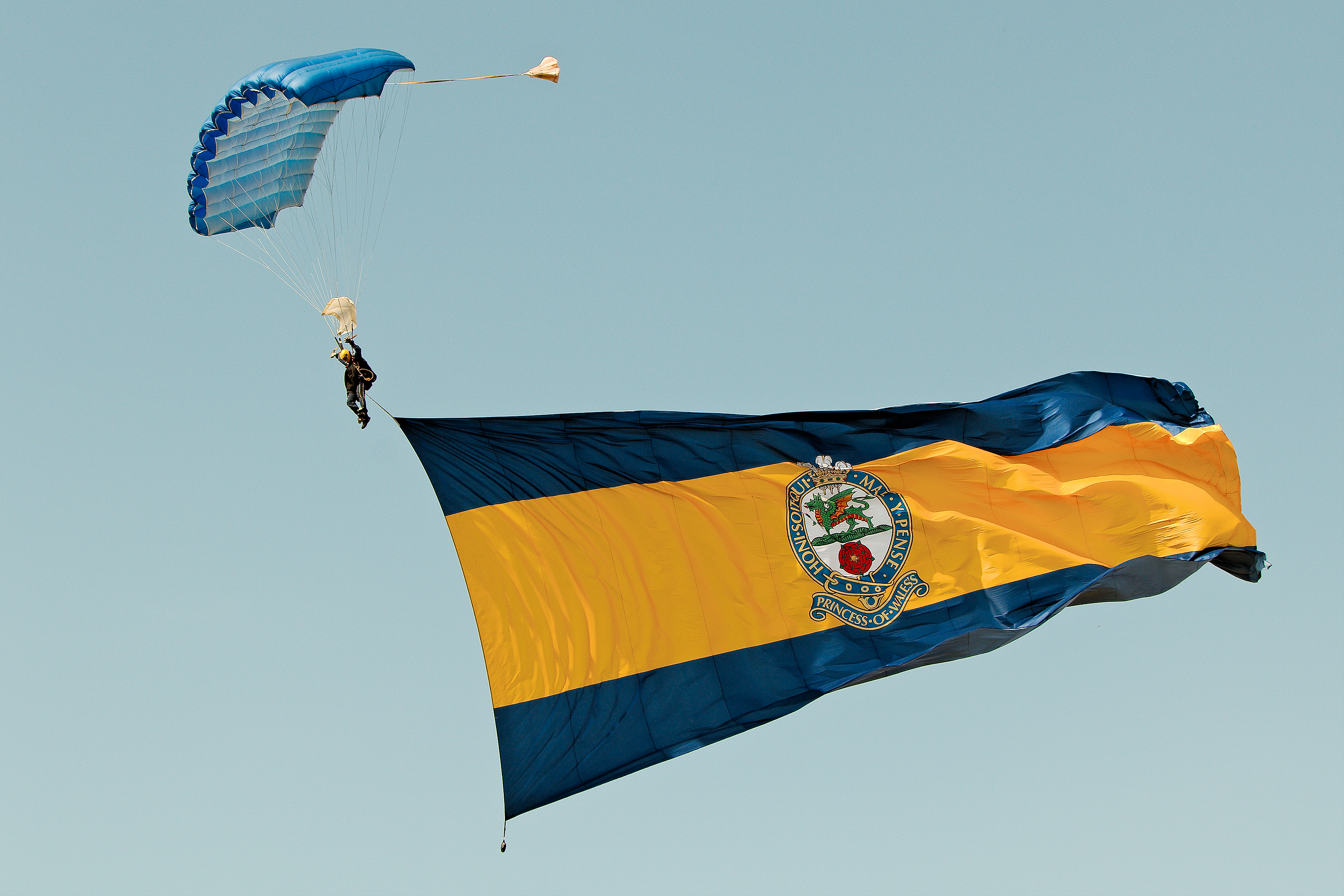
- The Tigers flying the PWRR regimental flag
- Active: 1986–present
- Country: United Kingdom
- Branch: British Army
- Type: Parachute demonstration and competition
- Role: Public relations and recruiting
- Garrison/HQ: RHQ - London
- Nickname: The Tigers
- Motto: Fierce Pride
- Website: Official website

The Tigers Army Parachute Display Team is a freefall parachute team of the British Army.

== History ==
The unit was formed in South Cambridgeshire in 1986 under the Queen's Division. The Queen's Division was formed in 1968. On 9 September 1992, the Queen's Regiment amalgamated with the Royal Hampshire Regiment to form the Princess of Wales' Royal Regiment. Members of this new regiment subsequently earned the nickname "Tigers". Said nickname was previously held by members of the Royal Hampshire Regiment.

Some soldiers in the division had the chance to parachute with 5 Airborne Brigade, part of 5th Infantry Brigade. The team has competed in the World Parachuting Championships. The team is registered with the British Parachute Association (BPA) and the British Air Display Association.
