= Murder of Simon Shotton =

2023 murder and dismemberment of a man in Bournemouth, England

- Date: c. 18 August 2023 (killing); c. 19 August – 1 September (dismemberment and disposal of body parts)
- Location: Boscombe, Bournemouth, Dorset
- Convicted: Benjamin Atkins; Debbie Ann Pereira
- Trial: Winchester Crown Court

On 18 August 2023, 49-year-old Simon Shotton was killed by 49-year-old Benjamin Atkins in Bournemouth, Dorset. Later, Atkins cut up Shotton's body and placed various parts around the town's Boscombe suburb.

Shotton had been living with Atkins and his partner, 39-year-old Debbie Pereira at Pereira's address, on an arrangement that he supplied them with crack cocaine and heroin. It was believed that the murder had been carried out due to Atkins not being happy with the amount of drugs that Shotton had or was providing to the couple in exchange for a place to stay.

Shotton's body was dismembered in the couple's flat using a hacksaw stolen from a local shop. Body parts were put into bin bags, a suitcase or deposited without any covering in various places across Boscombe and discovered by a member of the public and police on 26 August, before further discoveries were made by police on 2 September 6 September 2023 and 28 February 2024.

At court, Atkins and Pereira both denied murder. Atkins admitted perverting the course of justice and preventing the burial of a corpse, with Pereira also admitting preventing the burial of a corpse later during the trial, but denied perverting the course of justice.

On 22 May 2024, Atkins was found guilty of Shotton's murder, and Pereira was found not guilty. Pereira was found guilty of perverting the course of justice. The pair were later sentenced in July 2024.

== Background ==
=== Simon Shotton ===
Shotton was a 49-year-old man, who at the time of his death, had been living in the Boscombe suburb of Bournemouth. Prior to moving to Bournemouth, Shotton lived in Ipswich, Suffolk. It was reported that Shotton used the name 'Rio'.

In April 2020, Suffolk Constabulary attended his address in Woodbridge Road, Ipswich, locating 188 wraps of heroin and crack cocaine. Sutton explained to police that his address had been taken over by county lines dealers and in return for selling drugs with a youth they placed in the house, was given two wraps of drugs each night. Shotton was found guilty of possessing crack cocaine and heroin with intent to supply, as well as possession of heroin and crack cocaine. He was given a two-year prison sentenced that was suspended for two years.

On 1 February 2022, at Ipswich Crown Court, Shotton was sentenced to 3-years-and-1-month imprisonment for possession with intent to supply Class A drugs, namely heroin and crack cocaine, as well as possessing a bladed article in a public place, namely a knife.

In September 2022, Shotton was released on license, however, he had received threats about returning to Ipswich; Shotton allegedly had drug debts of £10,000. Not wanting to return to Ipswich, he decided to move to Bournemouth.

Moving to Bournemouth, Shotton was under the supervision of the Probation Service. He was subject to monthly probation meetings, arranged via text messages to a mobile phone of which the probation service provided Shotton with a SIM card for.

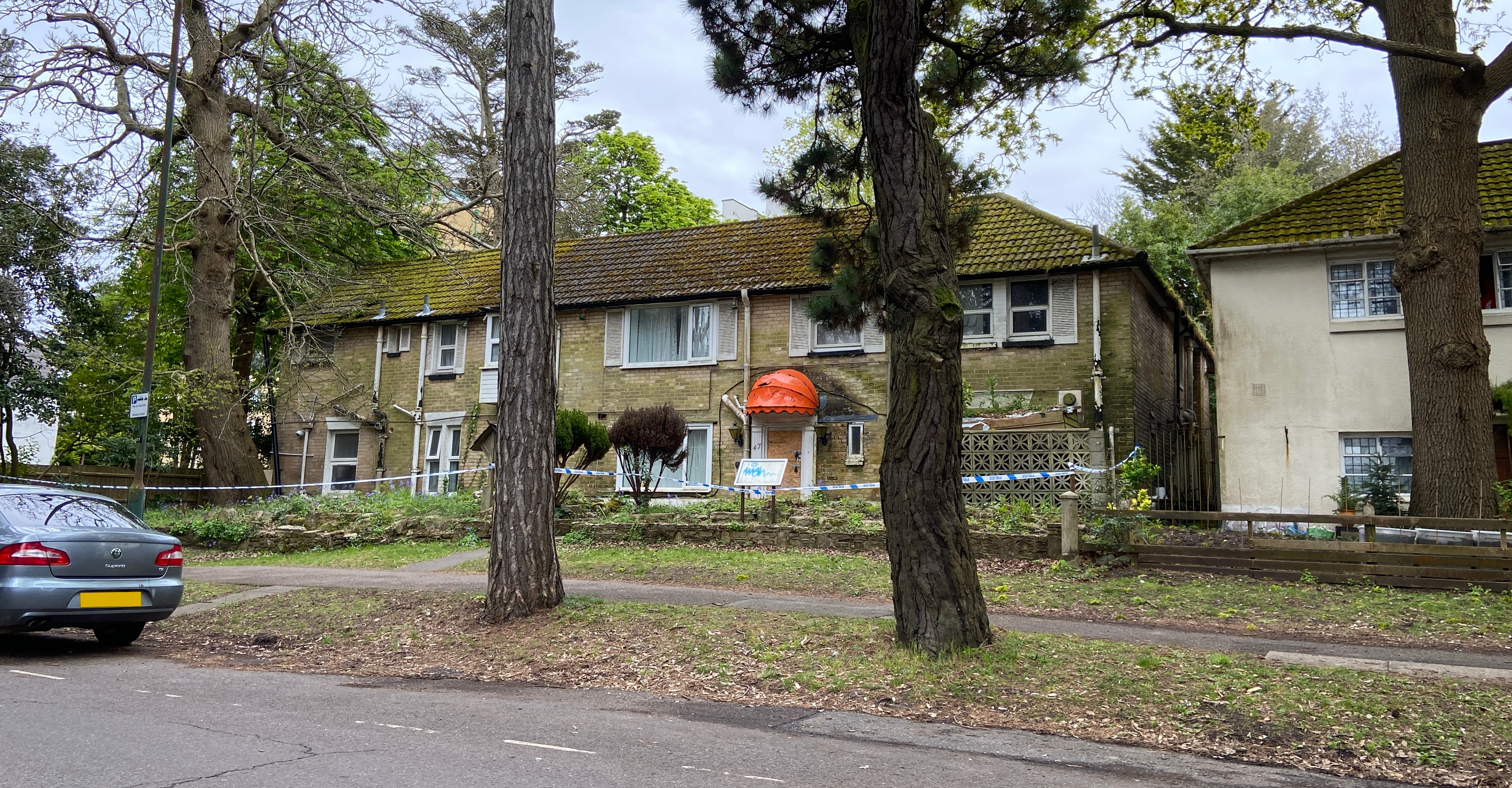
Derelict Mon Bijou Hotel, Manor Road, with police tape around it (not related to the murder)

Having moved to Bournemouth, Shotton stayed at the derelict remains of the Mon Bijou Hotel on Manor Road, which had been boarded up for approximately 10 years. According to a probation officer, the building was in the process of being renovated and was 'very run down'. Shotton lived in a small room, with make shift curtains and a bed. Shotton did not pay rent to live at the address and told his probation officer that there was an informal agreement of him being employed to stay at the address to deter squatters, of which there had been a problem throughout the time the property was empty. However, it had been suggested that Shotton was more of a squatter himself, who the owners tolerated being there.

Shotton's probation officer stated that she was worried about Shotton's use of heroin and crack cocaine, describing how Shotton was 'fairly open' about using cannabis. Unbeknown to the probation officer, there was evidence of crack cocaine having been smoked at the address that Shotton was staying at, as well as him sending texts advertising the sale of crack cocaine and heroin. Shotton was in fact a dealer for a main crack and heroin dealer in London called 'Roco'.

Approximately a month before August 2023 (either June or July), Shotton was asked to move on from the property, having previously been asked to leave several times and having had a disagreement with the owner of the building.

At approximately the end of July, a fellow drug user had met with Shotton for the last time, describing how he looked 'tired'. Asking Shotton if he was alright, Shotton told him that the 'dealers' he was working for were 'working him too hard'. (Note: This information was provided in a statement, but was not accepted when the case went to court. As the witness could not be traced, the statement could not be legally tested.)

=== Benjamin Atkins and Debbie Pereira ===
==== Atkins ====
Atkins was born in Oxford, Oxfordshire, where he lived with his mother, half brother and step father. Atkins' step father was abusive, with Atkins later stating how his step father 'shamed' him a number of times, as well as putting 'his hands on me'.

Atkins had attended The Cherwell School in Oxford. Aged 15, Atkins left school with no qualifications. He explained: "Like my home life, school wasn't really for me", noting that he could not focus due to the problems he had at home.

As he grew older, Atkins took a job abroad working for a removal firm, which involved travelling from the UK to Switzerland.

Atkins went through the 'party scene', taking a lot of LSD and ecstasy, before taking 'harder drugs' of heroin and cocaine, which he became addicted to.

In the late 1990s, Atkins moved in with his grandmother. When she died, in approximately 2000, Atkins went into drug treatment in Weston-super-Mare. For a few years after this, Atkins did not use drugs, instead, starting an apprenticeship. From here, he got into a relationship, where he had his first of three children.

Atkins' child was born premature and he noted a lot of pressure on his relationship. In 2005, he relapsed, before being clean from drugs in 2008, having attended a residential treatment centre in Bournemouth.

Atkins got into a new relationship at this time, however, the woman rejected him and Atkins later started to take drugs again, resulting in him losing his family, with one of his children returning to live with their mother. In 2018, Atkins got clean again.

In 2021, Atkins had a stroke, with it taking approximately 6 months for him to physically recover.

According to Pereira, Atkins was a paranoid schizophrenic and also had depression and had attempted to get help through the substance and mental health charity, We Are With You.

==== Pereira ====
Pereira was born in Johannesburg, South Africa, before being adopted into a family. She described her adopted father as an 'abusive alcoholic'. She stated that he would get his friends to go to her bedroom, noting how she was sexually and physically abused.

By the age of 12, Pereira had started drinking alcohol and snuck out her house to local clubs. On one occasion, she attended a nightclub and was kidnapped and falsely imprisoned for three days, being raped by two men she had met in the club. She stated that her mother had attended a hospital to identify a body that was believed to be hers.

At the age of 14, Pereira moved to the United Kingdom, living in Poole, Dorset.

At the age of 29, Pereira got with a man who introduced her to heroin. From here, she started to commit crime to fund her drug habit. Pereira had what she described as a 'horrifically abusive' long relationship with a previous partner (it is unknown whether this is the same man who introduced her to heroin).

At some stage, Pereira had two children. One of the twins she had was stillborn and at the time of her arrest, she had been getting over an anniversary of this.

Pereira was a long term drug user, described as wearing the 'mental scares of her life journey'. Having left a drug rehabilitation programme in 2018, Pereira was sober for 18 months, allowing her to have her children returned to her. However, getting into an abusive relationship, Pereira relapsed, before she moved into a dry house.

On leaving the dry house, Pereira moved into 18B Aylesbury Road in September 2021, returning to sobriety. At this time, she was single and also got to see her children. A neighbour described her as seeming "… quite friendly" and to be in a "really good frame of mind" in the first few months after meeting her in approximately 2021/2022. Pereira started drinking when Atkins first moved into her address, but initially was not taking drugs. However, a few months after Atkins moving in, whilst he relapsed on alcohol first, she relapsed on drugs first.

Having relapsed, Pereira stated that she was smoking heroin on a pipe, having previously used this intravenously. She added that she got her drugs from the "many dealers in Boscombe".

At the time of her arrest on suspicion of Shotton's murder, Pereira was a methadone user, having had OCD and agoraphobia, causing her not to go out and get panic attacks. She was seeking help with doctors and We Are With You regarding her agoraphobia.

==== Relationship ====
Pereira and Atkins met during a drug rehabilitation programme in July 2018 but were not romantically involved until approximately April/May 2022. This followed Atkins commenting on some of Pereira's posts on Facebook, with the pair arranging to see one another. Having started a relationship, Atkins moved into Pereira's address a few months after.

At the time of Shotton's death, and Atkins and Pereira had been in a relationship for 18 months. In August 2023, the couple were living together at Pereira's address of 18B Aylesbury Road in Boscombe, where they had been for over a year. A neighbour described them as "… a very happy couple". Another neighbour, who had known Pereira since she first moved into the address, stated that after Atkins appeared in Pereira's life, he noticed her appearance being 'slightly gaunt' and 'got thinner and appeared more pale'. It was noticed that she was 'less outwardly friendly'. It was also noticed that visits from Pereira's family to her address 'tailed off'. Atkins told the neighbour that the changes in Pereira's appearance were due to an eating disorder, with the neighbour starting to think that she was on drugs after Atkins had moved in. Another person visiting Aylesbury Road stated that he noticed "… a lot of people who I didn't recognise; messy clothes, scruffy appearances, were coming in and out."

The couple were using drugs together, having both relapsed. In order to fund their habit, Atkins would shoplift or the couple would find items that people had left outside their addresses, which included electrical items that the couple took to Cash Creators to exchange for money. They also funded their habits by using money from the government.

Pereira appeared to have mixed reviews on her relationship with Atkins.

After her arrest, Pereira described her relationship to police with Atkins as having a good connection, where they communicated and did not argue or fight and later told police: "I really fucking love him". She stated that when they both met, Atkins was not over his ex-partner and having to hear a lot about Atkins' ex-partner, she did not cope well, so started using drugs again. Whilst the couple had ongoing financial issues, Pereira stated that it was 'minor' and retorted: "We've got love". A person visiting Aylesbury Road alleged that he believed the couple had attempted to sell him what he thought was stolen produce.

However, Pereira later stated in court that her relationship with Atkins was 'draining', adding that the man she had met whilst in rehab was not the same person when they met again. Pereira put this down to the alcohol, which she stated turned Atkins into "something different". Despite this, she thought that she was in love with him.

Pereira stated that the reason for not ending the relationship with Atkins was because she felt "unworthy of love" and "unworthy of him".

Whilst Pereira stated that Atkins was never physically abusive to her, she stated that he used to "snarl his teeth" at her, knowing it would trigger her, as it was something her abusive step father used to do.

== Prior to Shotton's death ==
Atkins met Shotton a few months before he died, having been given his number when looking for a drug dealer. The pair arranged to meet, with Atkins finding Shotton to be throwing a large knife into a tree stump, which he took to be a scare tactic.

Pereira had met Shotton, as he was a drug dealer that the couple used to buy drugs from. Pereira stated that she had visited Shotton whilst he was staying at the derelict hotel in order to "score drugs off him".

Shotton told Pereira that as the building owner was worried he was dealing drugs from the address, he had been told he could not stay there anymore. This led Shotton having a discussion between Atkins and Pereira about staying at 18B Aylesbury Road, with an agreement being made that he could stay at the address in return for "£20 of crack [cocaine] and £20 of heroin everyday".

Having made an arrangement, Shotton provided the address when an offer was made to drop off his belongings by someone working on behalf of the owner of the derelict B&B.

Shotton explained to a friend that he was 'making sure they are both well each day, and it costs £30', which was in regards to providing heroin.

Atkins later stated that Shotton was only supposed to be staying at Pereira's address for 'a few days', however, this turned into 'a couple of weeks'. Shotton slept in either a tent in the garden or on the sofa inside the address. However, the relationship between Shotton and Atkins appeared to change, with Atkins finding it disrespectful that Shotton would not leave the couple drugs before he left the address, before returning with drugs, using them in front of the couple and not sharing them. It was reported there were arguments between Atkins and Shotton, as well as one argument between Pereira and Shotton. According to Atkins, things had started to go down hill when Shotton started to give him and Pereira less and less drugs. Atkins noted that Shotton "… started treating our house like a hotel" and was "very, very disrespectful".

During the early hours of 18 August, approximately 12:06 BST, Shotton had sent texts to a friend, telling her that it was 'stressful' where he was living and that he felt uncomfortable where he was. She did not know where Shotton was staying, but thought that he appeared frightened and told him that if he felt uncomfortable to pretend he was going to the shop and to leave his belongings at the address.

Shotton remarked that Atkins was an "ungrateful, blackmailing, vindictive, two faced wanker", adding "I'm so close to wanting to smash his face in". Shotton explained to his friend how Atkins had sent him blackmail messages, stating that: "I give them [Atkins and Pereira] two of each [heroin and crack cocaine] every day and the only one that says thank you for it is her [Pereira]. That's how much of a cunt he [Atkins] is to her, and everyone else." Shotton told her that Atkins was not happy with what Shotton gave him in return for accommodation.

Shotton had asked his friend if he could stay at her address and she offered him to stay there from the morning of 18 to 21 August, but at approximately 02:22 BST, Shotton told her that he was 'definitely staying' at the address where he was. These messages were later deleted (it is unknown whether this was by Shotton or others).

Between approximately 04:00 BST and 05:00 BST, Atkins and Pereira left Aylesbury Road, in order to get drugs. At approximately 04:00 BST, Shotton was shaving in the bathroom, with Atkins taking £30 out of his wallet when he was not looking. At 06:50 BST on 18 August, Atkins was seen on CCTV pushing a wheelbarrow (which he had taken from the corner of a driveway of a house they were walking past), with Pereira cycling alongside him, along Christchurch Road, through Boscombe, towards their home address. Within the wheelbarrow were two DVD players, an amplifier and a small surround sound set up. At approximately 06:57 BST, CCTV footage shows Atkins using a phone passed to him by Pereira, receiving a call from Shotton. Pereira later stated that Shotton had said "fucking put him on" and having handed the phone to Atkins, it sounded like he was shouting down the phone at him. Pereira described how Atkins appeared calm and was laughing at Shotton (something he later denied). It is presumed that the conversation was about the stolen money, with Atkins telling Shotton that they would "sort it out when we get home". At approximately 06:59 BST, Shotton text Atkins saying: "Ben, I'm telling you now, you must have my money when you get back home or w [sic]". According to Atkins, he did not have a chance to say anything back, but perceived what Shotton had said about having his money back as a threat. Atkins later stated that he went home immediately after the phone call, hoping that the situation could be resolved. Atkins and Pereira discussed getting money for Shotton by selling items at Cash Creators, hoping to get approximately £40 or £50.

Further communications recovered from Shotton's mobile revealed that he had been texting another friend, a male, to the effect that he needed to move out the address. The friend had previously dealt drugs to Pereira, who she had met around the same time as she had met Shotton. The friend had arranged with Shotton to collect him from Aylesbury Road on the morning of 18 August, at about 09:00 BST. Shotton's friend text him at approximately 07:30 BST, asking whether he was awake and that he should be at his address within the hour, driving from Southampton, Hampshire. Shotton replied at 07:35 BST stating: "The quicker the better bro, before I end up going back to jail". Shotton's friend asked what he meant (Shotton had not told his friend that he'd previously been in prison) and whether everything was ok, to which Shotton replied, asking him to get to the address as quick as possible and that he needed help putting his stuff into his friends car, stating he would tell his friend about what was going on when he arrived at his address.

At 07:50 BST, Shotton text his friend: "I have another little cunt who cannot keep his hands to himself", adding that Atkins had stolen £30 in wages off him. At 08:03 BST, Shotton texted his friend again, stating: "And they stole my packet of fags, fucking scumbags". Shotton told his friend that he had cut the power cable on the couples television. At 08:06 BST, the friend text Shotton that he was on the way to the address, with Shotton having last replied a minute before, indicating that he was still alive at this time.

== Shotton's death ==
What is known about the killing in the address is only from the accounts at court, which were as follows: (Note: It could be argued that there are issues as to the credibility of Pereira's evidence, who herself later admitted to police and at court that she had lied in interviews with police)

Having returned home at approximately 07:11 BST, Atkins and Pereira entered via the back door of the address. Pereira entered first, seeing Shotton in the utility room, about to inject heroin and crack cocaine (known as snowballing/speedballing). She stated that on walking into the address, Shotton stopped what he was doing, lifting the syringe up in a 'threatening gesture', shouting at Atkins "really loud", shouting: "I want my fucking money" and stating that what the couple had done was 'out of order'. Pereira shouted back at Shotton to move the syringe, putting her hand forward, to which Shotton moved the needle away. According to Atkins, Shotton said: "You better have my fucking money or I'm gonna kill you". Atkins noted how Shotton was 'popping up and down on his feet' and was 'aggressive'. Pereira did not feel like Shotton was going to stab her with the syringe, but thought it was "just a threat". Attempting to calm the situation down, Pereira told Shotton, who was described as being "very, very upset", that things were going to be fine and would be sorted, telling him not to worry.

Whilst talking to Shotton, Pereira was told by Atkins to go into their bedroom, where Atkins snarled his teeth at her, being very angry, to which Pereira thought was due to him feeling she had undermined him and been disloyal. She thought that this was due to the way she had been telling Shotton not to worry, which was not supportive of Atkins.

Atkins told Pereira to go into the utility room and tell Shotton that as soon as Cash Creators opened, they were going to sell items to attempt to give him his money back. Whilst doing this, Pereira stated that Shotton was still "really upset". Shotton told her that he did not like Atkins and did not know why Pereira was with him, with Pereira attempting to make Shotton be quiet.

Meanwhile, Atkins was shouting at her, so Pereira returned to the bedroom to see him, upset that he had been shouting at her and thinking that he was delusional, later noting that she thought she had given her everything to their relationship, but nothing was ever good enough for Atkins, who allegedly gaslighted her.

Having left the bedroom, the couple heard the door of the utility room shut and both thought that Shotton had left the address. Walking to the utility room to see if he was still there, they saw Shotton was still there, still "very angry" and telling them that he was not going to leave until he got his money.

Pereira stated that Atkins pushed passed her and began grappling with Shotton. However, Atkins stated that he took the items from the wheelbarrow into the utility room to show Shotton what would be sold for him to get his money, where, according to Atkins, Shotton was 'frothing at the mouth' and had a knife in his hand, poking Atkins in the stomach with it. Atkins described how the knife was approximately 10 or 12 inches, with a serrated edge.

According to Atkins, Shotton poked Atkins 'a couple of times', before lifting the blade above his head. In an attempt to defend himself, Atkins tried to grab the blade. Atkins later explained how he thought Shotton was going to kill him and felt 'terror'. Atkins described how Shotton looked 'like he was possessed' and from the way he looked, appeared high on cocaine.

Panicking, Pereira went into the bedroom, where she could hear the pair shouting at each other and some banging.

Meanwhile, according to Atkins, he grabbed the knife and tussled with Shotton, using a hair brush he had purchased from Primark to hit him around the collar bone, hearing it snap. On several occasions, Atkins stated he managed to disarm Shotton, whilst Shotton allegedly kept on going for the knife, as Atkins attempted to kick it away.

According to Atkins, the fight 'wasn't just the run of the mill punch up', noting how 'it was a battle'. Atkins stated the last thing he recalled was Shotton being on top of him, raising the knife above his head and made a 'demonic noise', "like 'ha', like it was over".

Hearing the commotion, she ran back to where the pair were, where she noticed the door of the utility room, which had been open when she left the room, was now closed. Going towards the room, she saw Atkins was on the floor, with Shotton on top of him. She saw Shotton hunched over Atkins and had hold of him. Atkins shouted at Pereira to go into the bedroom, which she did.

Meanwhile, according to Atkins, out of panic, poked his thumb in Shotton's left eye socket as hard as he could. From here, he managed to get on top of Shotton, grabbing whatever he could, which was a small round heavy speaker, striking Shotton with it "half a dozen times" (Atkins later stated that he could not be precise, but he struck Shotton 'between 3 and 6 times'). Atkins later stated that by the last time he hit Shotton, he was unconscious. Atkis later stated that it was his intention to stop Shotton trying to kill him, describing how he had 'caved' Shotton's head in (Atkins later stated that when he said he 'caved his [Shotton's] head in', it was a 'figure of speech' and how he had not caved his head in, but how he had hit Shotton with enough force to kill him, using 'sufficient force').

For approximately five minutes, here, she continued to hear shouting and banging, before it went quiet, just before Atkins walked through the door of the bedroom.

Before entering the bedroom, having struck Shotton, according to Atkins, he saw Shotton had stopped moving. On checking Shotton's pulse, Atkins could not find one. He later noted: "There was blood everywhere. It was a fucking battle". Atkins later stated that the reason he did not call for an ambulance or commence CPR was due to him being confused and that he had 'nasty injuries' himself.

Covered in blood over his face and top half, Atkins returned to the bedroom and told Pereira: "It's over, he's dead". Atkins allegedly told Pereira that Shotton's last words were 'help me' and that Atkins had told her: "When he [Shotton] died, he fucking pissed himself". Pereira later stated that during this moment, she felt "paralysed" and "scared", as she tried to "comprehend what happened". Atkins later denied saying this.

== Aftermath ==
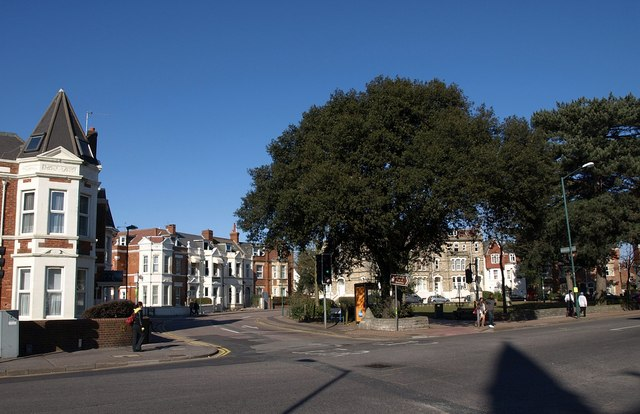
The Crescent, Boscombe. The entrance to Aylesbury Road is between the two white-fronted buildings on the left of the photograph

=== 18 August ===
Immediately after Shotton's death, Atkins told Pereira that he was going to "deal with this" and that she did not have to worry about anything, with Atkins telling her: "I know what I'm doing". He told Pereira: "No one's going to look for him, no one's going to be bothered, no one's going to care", telling her that all she had to do was "… keep quiet". Pereira later stated that she was "shocked", not wanting Shotton hurt or killed.

Atkins had take Shotton's crack pipe from his pocket, which was loaded with crack cocaine, with the couple then smoking the drugs. The couple were in the bedroom for approximately an hour or more, however, Pereira later accepted that her timings could be wrong due to her having been smoking drugs.

At some stage, Atkins moved Shotton's body into the garden, later stating that he was not sure why he did this during the day (the address' garden is overlooked by neighbouring properties).

Atkins and Pereira stated that they smoked and Atkins had a shower, reiterating various things to her, attempting to calm her down. She later described Atkins as "… just really, really calm." At some point, she noticed injuries on Atkins' hand, seeing him bandaging these up. Atkins placed the clothes he was wearing in a bag, along with the speaker he had used to kill Shotton and the knife Shotton had, disposing of these items. Atkins later stated that he burned the clothes that he was wearing.

At 08:24 BST, the male friend text Shotton that he on the road outside the address. However, not knowing the exact number of the property, the man could not knock. He attempted to call Shotton at approximately 08:29 BST, however, received no answer from both the phone call and texts. The friend sent a final text at approximately 08:31 BST, telling Shotton that he would wait five minutes before then leaving. Having sent that message, Shotton's friend waited for approximately half an hour, before he left.

An hour after Shotton's last message, Atkins (Note: Pereira identified the male on CCTV shown to her during her third police interview on 3 September 2023, as Atkins. However, on the fifth day of the trial (17 April 2024), the prosecution stated: "To make it clear, we cannot say who it is, because the footage is simply not clear enough." This was verified on the Daily Echo live feed. However, on the eleventh day of the trial, Pereira stated that she did not know whether the man on CCTV was Atkins, stating that she could not tell, despite having pointed out in her police interview that the person on CCTV was Atkins.) was seen on CCTV to walk across Boscombe Crescent from Aylesbury Road, appearing to be carrying a bin bag or sack, with something rectangular within it.

Shortly before midday, the couple left the address – Pereira stated that she had seen Shotton's body through a window, covered in blankets and clothing in the utility room on collecting her jacket to leave the address, describing this as "horrible". At 11:55 BST, CCTV showed Atkins and Pereira exiting Randolph Road, heading towards Cash Creators with a soldering iron and glue gun that belonged to Shotton, appearing to be wearing different clothing from the previous CCTV footage. According to Pereira, Atkins had wanted to sell the glue gun and soldering iron and she had accompanied him, despite not wanting to go out, as she had an account at the shop.

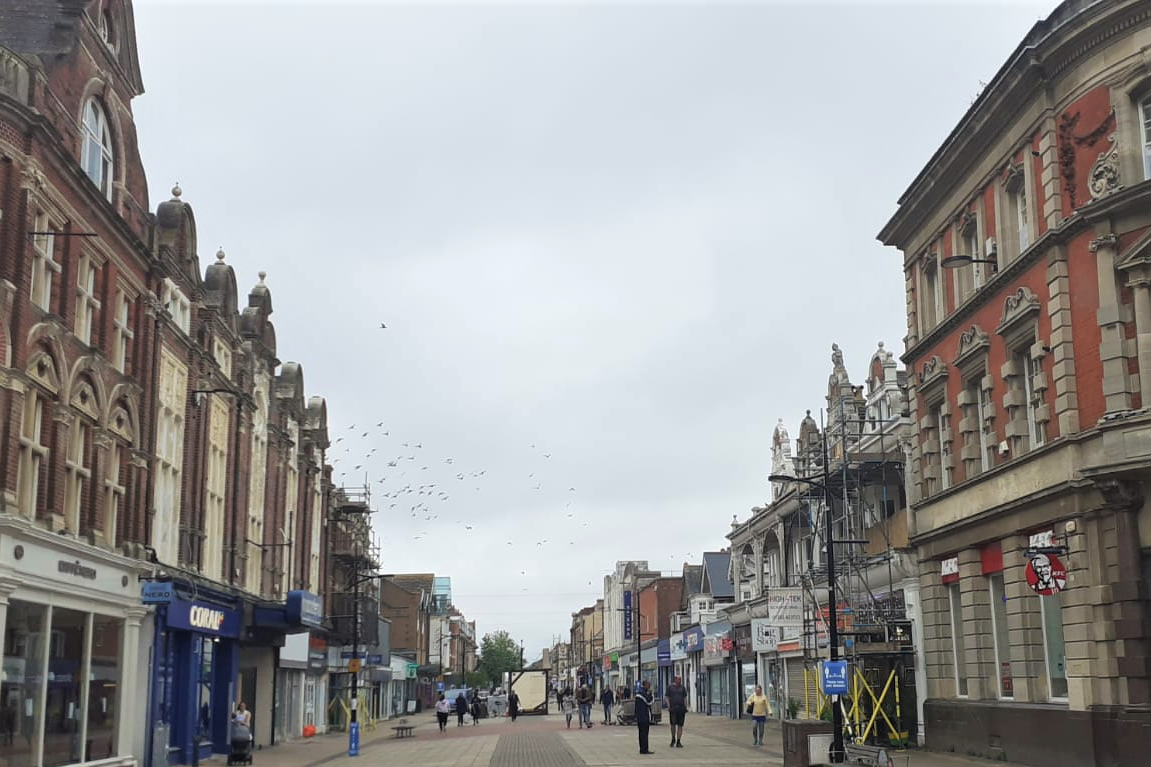
Boscombe High Street, where Atkins and Pereira went to a shop to sell Shotton's mobile phone and to another shop where one of them stole a hacksaw

Arriving at the shop, they attempted to sell two DVD players, a soldering kit and a glue gun. Whilst the soldering kit and glue gun were accepted, the shop worker did not accept the DVD players, as they were not provided with a remote. Atkins was seen wearing a large wrist support on his right hand, covering most of his hand and half way up his forearm. On his left wrist, there appeared to be clear tape holding a small dark patch (appearing to be a homemade plaster), with plasters on fingers on his left hand. Pereira was heard to say to him words to the effect of 'you've hurt your hand, innit'.

Shotton's female friend text him at 12:10 BST but never received a reply.

Having left Cash Creators at approximately 13:00 BST, Atkins and Pereira were captured on various CCTV cameras to walk back along Christchurch Road towards Pokesdown, away from their address. At 13:30 BST, they were seen to head into Aylesbury Road and back towards their address, where they used drugs.

Later that day, at approximately 16:00 BST, Atkins and Pereira are seen on CCTV, with Pereira in another different outfit, whilst Atkins wore the same clothing he was seen in whilst in Cash Creators. Walking together from Aylesbury Road towards the shops, however, they are seen to separate. Atkins continues into the shopping area in Boscombe, whilst Pereira appeared to turn back, alone, returning to the address, as they had forgotten a crack pipe. The couple were back together at approximately 16:41 BST.

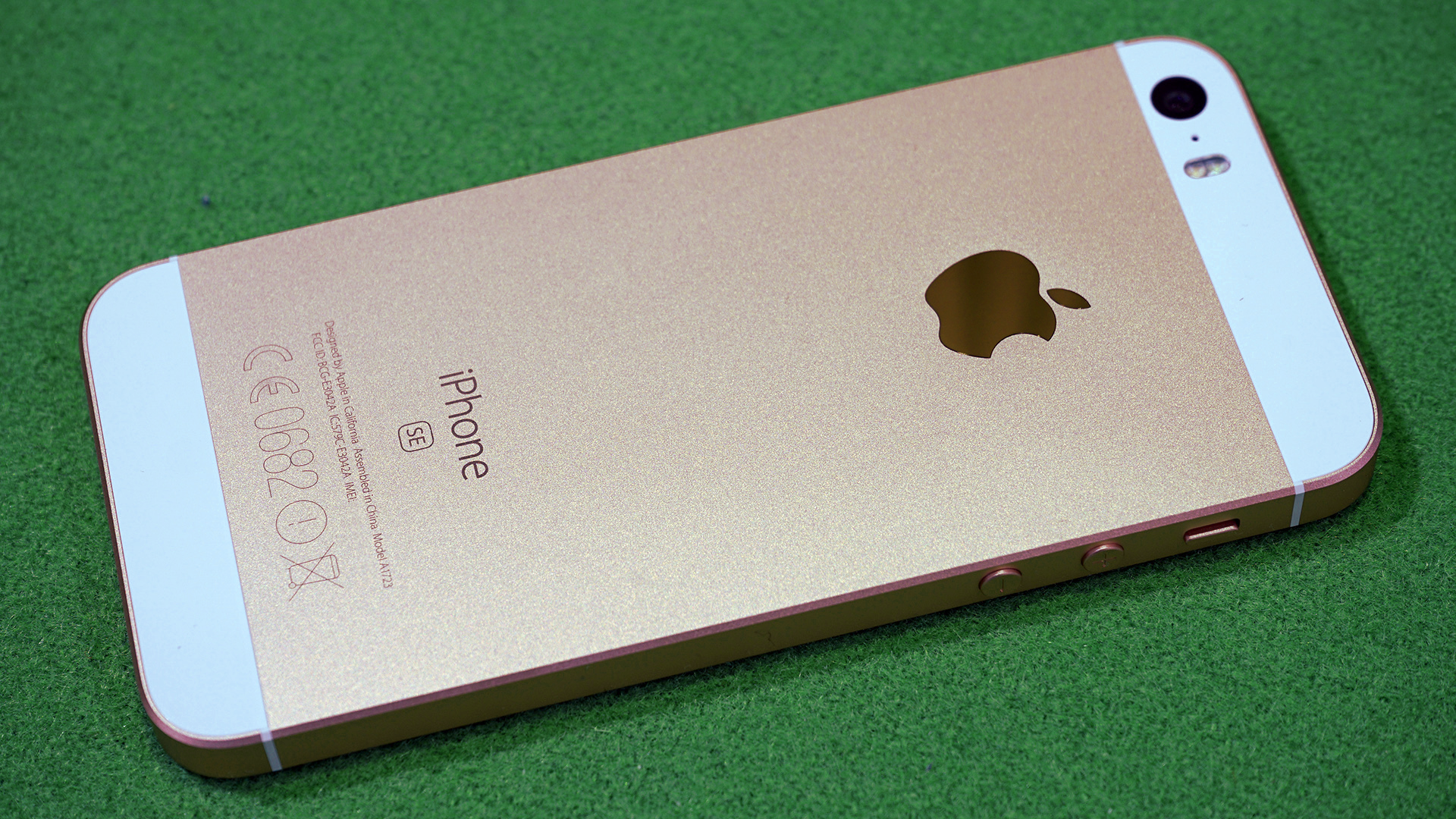
An IPhone SE, similar to the type Shotton had

Both on bikes, shortly after 17:00, they re-attended Cash Creators, where Pereira sold Shotton's rose gold coloured iPhone SE for £15 at 17:15 BST. Atkins and Pereira knew the pin to the phone, as Shotton had let her use the phone before. Whilst in the store, a member of staff used Shotton's phone to call the shop, to see if it worked. The shop refused to buy the bike that Atkins had, as he did not have any photo identification.

At some point, a couple saw Atkins and Pereira at Cash Creators. They noted that Atkins had cuts on his hand, which he told the male of the couple was due to 'a fight'. (Note: Both the female and male of the couple failed to respond to requests to provide witness statements, but were spoken to by police, noting this interaction. https://www.bournemouthecho.co.uk/news/24275098.bournemouth-body-parts-murder-trial-day-nine/) Atkins and Pereira then returned home, arriving back at the flat at approximately 17:45 BST.

Over the following days, the friend who had arranged to meet Shotton on 18 August tried to call again, but could not get through to Shotton. The friend who had text Shotton during the early hours of the same day sent another text but never received a reply. It was later found that this text message was not deleted off of Shotton's phone.

=== 19 August ===
At some time on the following day, Pereira went into the utility room for the first time, finding blood "everywhere, all over the walls, on the floor." Either at this time or the day before, Atkins asked her to help clean this up, with Pereira bringing a bucket of water and wiping a wall. However, having wiped the wall twice, she stopped when she 'couldn't do it anymore', crying. Atkins allegedly told Pereira that he had moved Shotton's body into the garden, as she did not want it in the flat.

Atkins and Pereira were seen on CCTV at 11:38 BST on Walpole Road (near to their home address). CCTV showed them walking through Christchurch Road, where, at approximately 12:37 BST, they went into the Sovereign Centre in Boscombe, before going into Wilko. On the way to Wilko, Atkins had told Pereira that he was going to "chop up" Shotton's body and "put it in the sea". Whilst in the shop, the couple separated, and one of them stole a hacksaw, before meeting up again and leaving the shop, going further into the shopping centre. CCTV appeared to show Atkins concealing the stolen saw, with something underneath his armpit, appearing to have a red handle or something that is red.

Later, at 12:47 BST, the couple were seen on CCTV to walk towards their home address and whilst on Christchurch Road, CCTV shows what appears to be a saw dangling off the handle of the bicycle that Atkins is pushing.

== Dismemberment and disposal of Shotton's body ==
According to Atkins, on the evening of 19 August, he cut Shotton's body up, turning his body over when he did so. He stated that he would not have cut up Shotton's body if he was not under the influence of drugs, noting how he was 'scared', 'traumatised' and 'panicked'.

Atkins later stated that he feared who Shotton was connected with and whether they would 'come for me', adding: "I figured if nobody could find him, he'd just disappear, then I wouldn't face the repercussions".

In cutting Shotton's body up, Atkins removed and then burned Shotton's head in an attempt to dispose of it, noting that it was the smallest part. Atkins later stated that there was not any different smell to "anything being on the BBQ".

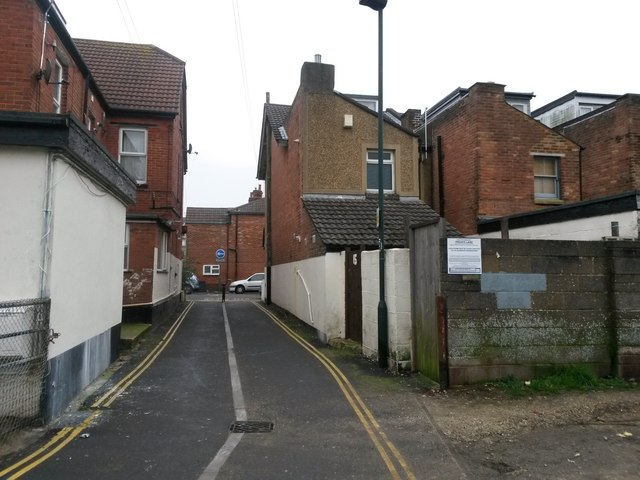
Walpole Lane, Boscombe, where Atkins deposited the remains of Shotton's skull

Atkins figured that if he could incinerate Shotton's head, then he may be able to incinerate the other parts of Shotton's body. However, he did not do so, as he found it was "very, very time consuming".

Atkins used a brick laying trowel to tap on what remained of Shotton's skull, noting how "it just turned to dust". He noted that Shotton had no teeth and that his jaw had 'disintegrated'. Atkins emptied what remained into a carrier bag and scattered it into an alleyway (believed to be Walpole Lane).

Atkins later stated that it took half an hour or 40 minutes for him to dismember the rest of Shotton's body. He noted how he 'chopped' up Shotton, bagging up his legs.

Having dismembered Shotton, Atkins hid Shotton's body parts in the garden, not telling Pereira where they were. He stated that he did not have a plan as to what to do with the body parts, noting how instead his plan was to "get absolutely wankered on drugs", continuing to live his life as best he could, knowing that he had taken Shotton's life. Atkins drank and took a lot of drugs, before gradually starting to leave Shotton's remains in places.

Within the first week of Shotton's death, Atkins first deposited Shotton's legs, removing them from Pereira's address by telling her that he was going to get methadone from the chemist. Instead, he cycled with Shotton's legs in a bag and deposited of them in a bush at the Manor steps zig-zag on Boscombe Cliff Road.

Approximately one to two days after disposing of Shotton's legs, Atkins removed Shotton's torso that he had wrapped up in tarpaulin in the garden, placing it in a suitcase that he had taken that had been left out on a wall. Late at night, Atkins ensured that Pereira was fast asleep, before he left the address, wheeling the suitcase to Boscombe Chine Gardens, before disposing of it in a bush.

Atkins left Shotton's arms in the garden of Pereira's address, but later could not account for why he had not disposed of them.

== Investigation ==
The investigation into Shotton's death was conducted by Dorset Police's Major Crime Investigation Team (MCIT), led by Detective Chief Inspector Neil Third.

=== 26 August ===
==== Discovery of legs ====
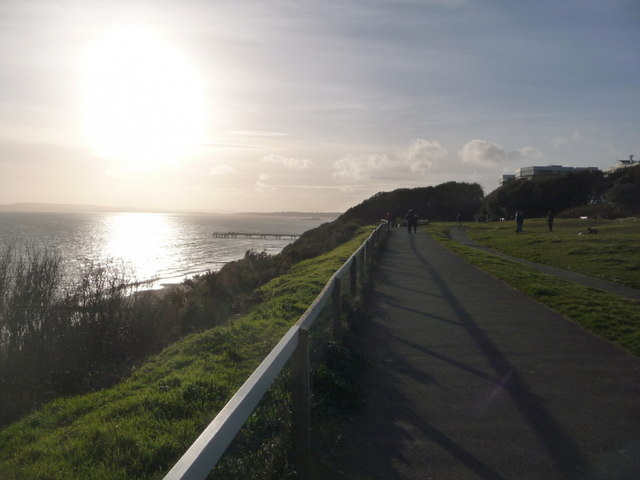
The clifftop at Boscombe, close to the Manor Steps zig-zag where some of Shotton's remains were discovered

On 26 August 2023, at approximately 12:45 BST, a member of the public who was working on Boscombe seafront, walked up the Manor steps zig-zag, in the direction of the seafront to Boscombe Cliff Road. As she did so, there was an influx of heavy rain, causing her to stop under some overhanging branches to shelter. Having waited there for around five minutes, an item landed beside her with a 'very loud thump as it hit the floor'. Initially, she thought someone had thrown something at her and the woman ran away.

However, not being able to see anyone in the surrounding area, she wondered whether the item had been dislodged by the rain and returned to it. On returning to the item, she found a large package that smelt badly, as if something inside was rotting. She initially thought that it was a dead animal, before noticing it looked padded and had a phone attached to it, with grey masking tape around it.

She decided not to look inside it, making her way back to her nearby office. Initially, she thought not to call police at that time, not being sure as to what the time was and not wanting to waste their time. Arriving there, she collected her raincoat, before heading back to the beach to continue working.

Around 15 minutes later, the woman walked back down the zig-zag, and saw the package again, thinking that it had been moved and that the grey masking tape that was around it looked loose. Approaching the package, the woman realised the shape appeared to be that of a human foot, with some of it being exposed. Still 'not 100% sure of what it was' she contacted the police via 101 at approximately 13:10 BST.

Police attended the scene very quickly and as an officer walked towards the package, he smelt a 'pungent smell' that he associated with a decomposing body. Another officer, described the item wrapped in black plastic, 'like that of a bin liner', secured with 'two strips of grey tape'. The officer noticed 'something white' poking out of the plastic, smelling what he described as a 'foul smell'.

Using a pen knife to slightly open a part of the package, an officer exposed the foot and leg further, confirming what it was, having seen what he thought was a 'toe with a nail on it'. The leg had been cut at the mid thigh and another officer later remarked how it appeared to them that it was a human foot, 'discoloured with a green tinge'.

The officer, wanting to identify where the package had fallen from and as to whether there were any suspects present, climber over a nearby fence, going towards undergrowth, where they located a similar package. This package contained another leg, also cut at the mid thigh. Police believed that the torrential rain had dislodged the packages from where they were hidden.

=== 31 August ===
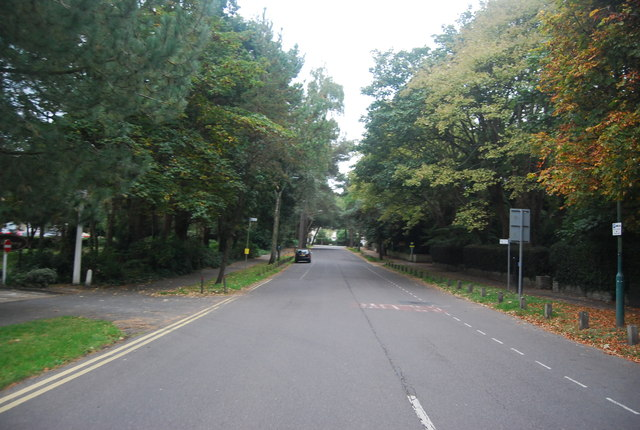
Manor Road, Boscombe, in the direction of where Shotton was living

==== DNA profile attributes legs to Shotton ====
On 31 August, a complete DNA profile, taken from 12g samples of muscle tissue, revealed that the legs belonged to Shotton. The forensic scientist later stated that it was 'at least 1 billion times more likely' that the legs were Shotton's than of someone else.

Police conducted enquiries into locating Shotton's last known address and through the probation service, were given a telephone SIM card number that Shotton had given them, as well as his last notified address in Manor Road, Boscombe.

Arriving at the address, police found it to be a derelict B&B with no-one in. A search was carried out, before a man who had responsibility for the building arrived. He explained that as the site needed to be cleared, Shotton had been asked to move on. The man showed text messages he had exchanged with Shotton on 10 August about getting his possessions sent to 18 Aylesbury Road in Boscombe.

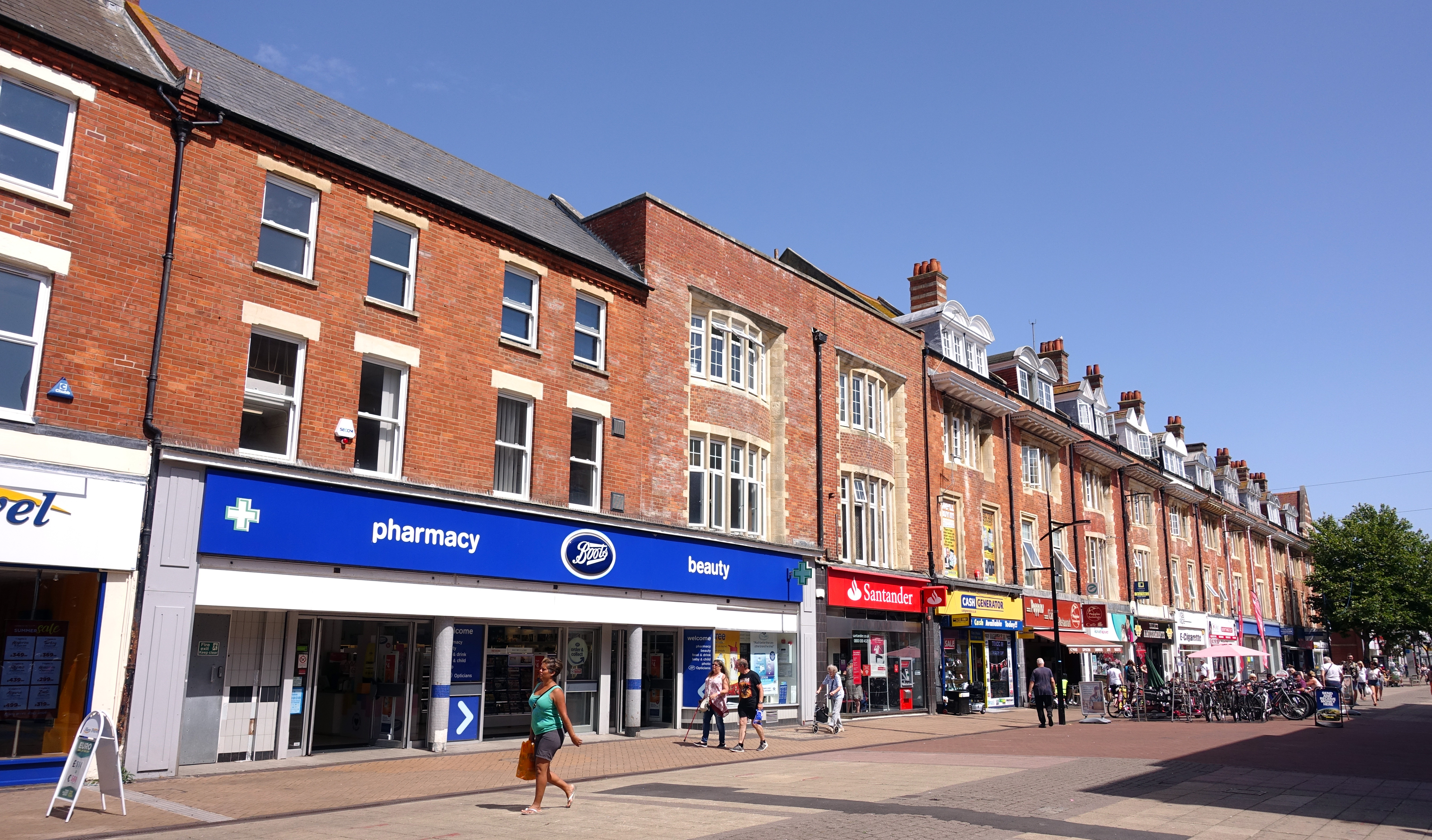
Boscombe High Street, the location of the Cash Creators store (pictured, as the yellow-fronted shop, lower right)

Meanwhile, police continued their enquiries in relation to Shotton's phone number. The phone data revealed that the last call made was at 17:25 BST on 18 August to a landline of 01202 729902. Police called the landline and an employee at Cash Creators, picked up. Attending the store, police discovered Shotton's iPhone SE, which had been brought into the shop. The shop informed police that a woman, Pereira, a regular customer who visited to sell 'random' items, had brought the iPhone into the shop in exchange for cash, providing CCTV that showed Pereira, along with Atkins, attending the store.

=== 1 September ===
On the morning of 1 September, Atkins and Pereira left their flat, speaking to a neighbour who was outside of number 20. Pereira said hello to the neighbour, whilst Atkins told him that he had found a dead fox with a pigeon in its mouth and had subsequently cremated it. The neighbour immediately found this strange, given his own experience of living in the countryside and how 'unbelievable' it was that a fox would die with a pigeon in its mouth.

==== Arrest of Atkins and Pereira ====
Atkins and Pereira later stated that they were both unaware that severed legs had been discovered on 26 August.

At some time after 21:00 BST on 1 September, police attended 18B Aylesbury Road. At 21:12 BST, police arrested Pereira on suspicion of murder. Beginning to cry, Pereira repeated: "I haven't done anything wrong" and appeared shocked. She later stated that she had not read any media coverage of body parts being located prior to being arrested. Asked whether there was anyone else at the address, she told police there was not, stating that she had a boyfriend who occasionally visited. This was a lie – Atkins had been with her when the police burst through the front door, fleeing through the utility room and out of the back door. Evidence bags were placed over her hands in order to prevent contamination, before Pereira was transported to Bournemouth police station.

Meanwhile, police searched the outside of the address and an officer, using a torch, saw a person's hiding behind a wheelbarrow, having seen their head to the side of it. The person was crouched down in a gap between the wheelbarrow and a ladder. The person stood up and the officer recognised him as Atkins. At 21:12 BST, the officer arrested Atkins on suspicion of murder. Atkins later stated that he initially did not know it was the police, not being sure whether it was someone attempting to get him. Police seized a Sol mobile phone from Atkins on arrest that was later found to belong to Shotton (potentially being used for drug dealing).

The arrests of both Atkins and Pereira were recorded on police body-worn video cameras.

At some stage, police took a statement from Shotton's female friend, who stated that the 'general gist of messages' from Shotton to her, was that he was staying with a male, who was not nice to him, as well as a female, who was nice to him.

=== 2 September ===
==== Discovery of arms ====
On 2 September, police conducted a forensic examination in the garden of the address. While conducting a search, a Crime Scene Investigator (CSI) noted a smell of decomposition that he described was 'detectable at intervals, despite wearing a mask'. This smell was found to be from items near to an extension, were leaning against the wall were items including a mountain bike, wheelbarrow and a ladder, which an item of clothing had been placed on.

Within that area, two black bin bags were located underneath the wheelbarrow where Atkins had been located hiding. Creating a hole in the bag, CSIs exposed fingers and discovered that each bag bag contained a severed arms, which had been cut in the middle of the upper area of them.

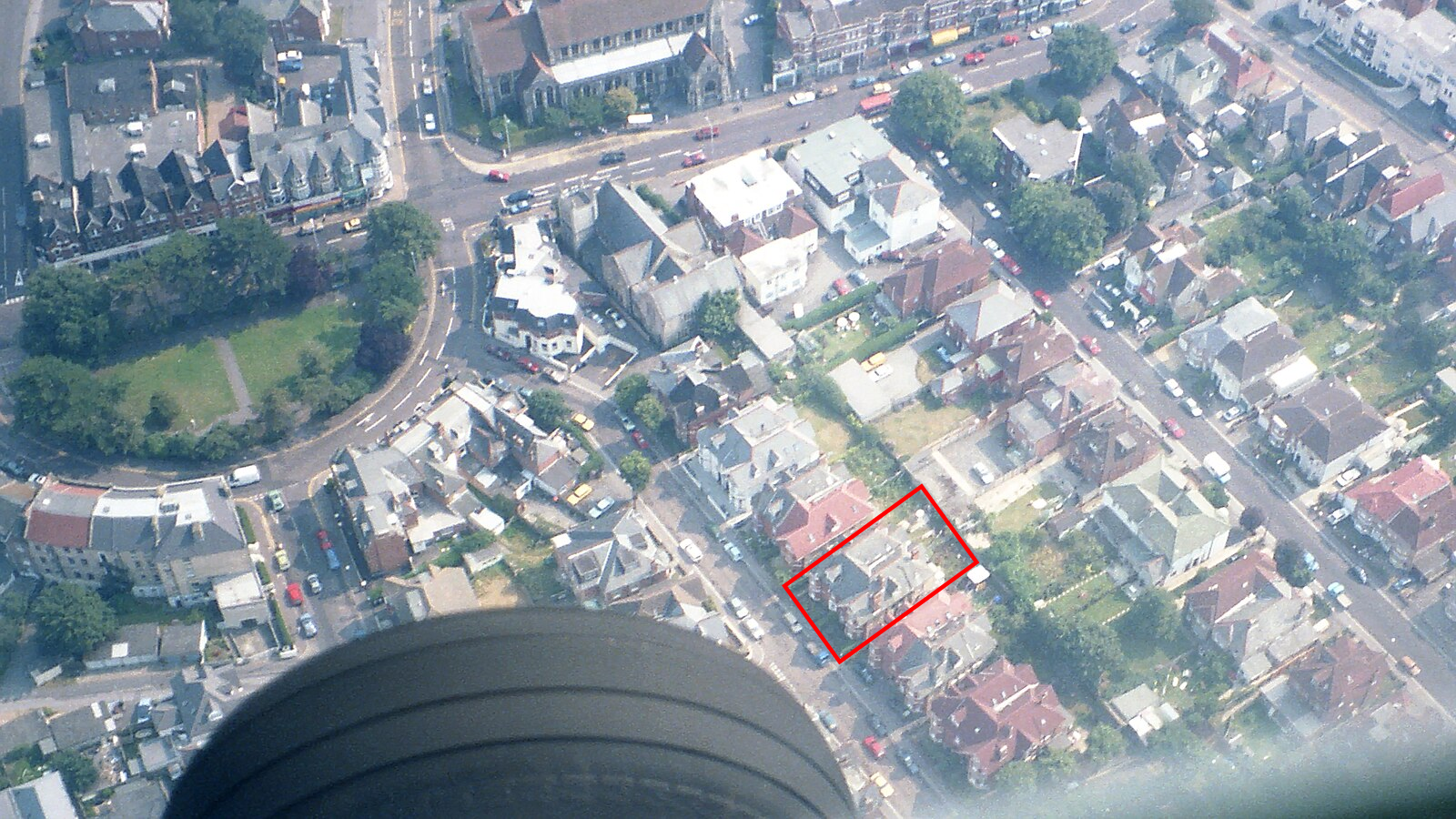
18B Aylesbury Road and garden (highlighted in red – photo taken from the air in 1992), where Shotton's arms were discovered and a forensic examination uncovered it was apparent he had been dismembered in the utility room of the address

=== Forensic examination of Atkins and Pereira's address ===
The forensic examination also located Shotton's blood that had collected in a pool, having seeped over the edge of the linoleum in the address' utility room, as well as the concrete underneath. It appeared that some of the blood was diluted with water, consistent with a large quantity of blood being present and water having been used to clear it up. According to a scientific expert who conducted blood pattern analysis at the address, cleaning chemicals can break down biological material, cells and completely remove DNA. Other airborne droplets of blood were located on the washing machine as well as some within the fate on the top of a radiator.

In the doorway between the living and utility room, two separate blood stains were located on the carpet. Whilst a forensic scientist could not establish how they got there, a DNA profile matched that of Shotton's to a 'very high probability'.

There was no blood staining in the kitchen or bathroom of the address. Blood was located within the grouting behind the sink, the carpet in the lounge and on the height adjustment leave of a stool located in the utility room. Within this room, some blood had been wiped from the wall. Blood was also located on the wheelbarrow that Atkins was found hiding behind. There was also staining on a garden fence, but a forensic scientist thought that this could have been deposited by flies, due to it being 'occasional in nature' and not forming a 'particular pattern'.

There was evidence of decoration having occurred on a light cream painted wall, with a slightly darker magnolia paint that had been applied in a 'sporadic and haphazard fashion', as well as the words 'I love you' having been painted. Blood staining was identified that had been partially obscured by paint, suggesting that paint was used to cover blood up, with the blood having been present before the paint.

The garden showed no signs that Shotton's body was dismembered there, including any significant blood loss. There was a 'small, ill defined blood stain' located within the opening of the tent in the garden, but a DNA sample was not able to be successfully obtained.

Blood samples were taken from the address which matched Shotton's DNA profile. This was from blood on the wall (under the paint), within grouting behind the sink. within the grating of the top of a radiator and within a pair of shoes. Shotton's DNA was also discovered on blood on a sponge floor cleaner. A forensic expert also located a weak DNA result on a screwdriver that had blood staining on it, but they were unable to say whether Shotton's DNA had originated from blood on this item, with the item providing a mixed DNA result.

Swabs taken from within a wheelbarrow in the garden indicated Shotton's DNA, as well as someone else, but not that of Atkins or Pereira.

Blood samples matching Atkins' DNA profile were located on staining on a door leading from the utility room into the garden, as well as within the inside of a pair of shoes, which was on top of a DNA profile belonging to Shotton. A mixed profile that could possibly be from Atkins on the handle of a mop.

A forensic scientist found that the forensic evidence at the address supported that Shotton was dismembered in the utility room of the address, but they were not able to conclude whether any dismemberment had occurred in the garden.

As of 13 September, the house remained cordoned off.

=== Interview of Atkins and Pereira ===
Having been taken to Bournemouth police station into custody, during the late afternoon and evening of 2 September and into 3 September, Pereira and Atkins were interviewed. Atkins provided a no comment interview (having been instructed by his solicitor to do so), whilst Pereira gave several accounts over five and a half hours of interviews. Whilst in custody, Pereira was seen by medical professionals in relation to 'addiction issues', with treatment being possible to alleviate symptoms.

==== 2 September ====
===== Pereira's first account =====
At approximately 17:02 BST on 2 September, Pereira's first interview began. In her first interview, she stated that she had known Shotton, whom she knew as 'Rio', since around May or June 2023, when her and Atkins started taking crack cocaine again. She stated she knew him to be a crack and heroin user who had been involved in supplying those drugs to feed his habit. She stated she had known him for 'probably a few months' and that Shotton had visited the couples flat on one occasion to take drugs together.

She added that on one occasion, Shotton had been at the address smoking crack cocaine with the couple. She noted how she felt 'uneasy' when Shotton injected drugs in the bathroom. After this, she stated he left the address, however, left his phone behind. After not returning to collect it for 'a few weeks', she decided to sell it, as she had no money and on 18 August, she and Atkins 'wanted some crack'. She added that if she saw him again, it would only have cost her £20 to get the phone back. She stated she was agoraphobic, so did not go out that much.

Pereira was shown pictures of the package where Shotton's legs were located on the zig zags. Pereira replied that she would not be forensically linked to the tape or black bag when she was asked, but stated she had black bags and tape at her address that Atkins had told her he had been using to paint the utility room. She agreed that there was a similarity between the tape in the photos and the tape that Atkins had.

Pereira stated that she was not aware that Shotton had been killed, had died or about any remains until she was told by police, not even watching the news regarding human remains being discovered on the zig zags. She stated that she had no role in the death or dismemberment of Shotton and did not know who was responsible for his death, dismemberment or disposal of his remains. She added she was not present when he died and when asked whether she was protecting anyone, answered: "No, no, no". Police asked whether she was concerned whether Atkins was involved, to which Pereira stated whilst she had thought about it, stated she had thought that he 'wouldn't do anything like that'.

===== Pereira's second account =====
Approximately four hours after her first interview, at 21:00 BST, Pereira was interviewed again, where she was informed that police had located Shotton's arms. Pereira began the interview admitting that she had lied in her previous interview regarding Shotton having only stayed at her address for four hours, stating that he had in fact stayed at her flat for two nights, before then staying in a tent in the garden around the 18 August, having asked to stay due to falling out with someone. Pereira stated that Shotton did not say much about the falling out, other than it being with someone he lived with and that he 'couldn't stay there no more'. Pereira stated that her and Atkins had the tent 'weeks' before meeting Shotton, telling police that they had a tent in the garden, as they were going to 'do the garden up' and then stay in the tent together.

Pereira stated that she, Atkins and Shotton were all 'getting along fine', with Atkins telling Shotton about God and how he had been baptised, with his sins being washed away. She described that Shotton was: "A bit like, judgemental".

She stated that the last time she had seen Shotton was at the address, with him, her and Atkins taking drugs. Pereira stated that the drugs were from Shotton, with him keeping them within a 'little gold pot'. She then left the room to go to bed, with Shotton going outside to sleep in the tent after midnight, whilst Atkins remained on the sofa. Awaking at 11:00, Pereira stated that Shotton and all his belongings had disappeared. Entering the lounge, Atkins, still on the sofa and watching television, told her that Shotton had stayed outside all night in the tent and would be back that evening.

She added that she had noticed Atkins had been 'burning stuff' within the garden and that he had cuts on his fingers, but was not sure when this had occurred (a neighbour who Atkins later helped build a storage unit noticed a bandage on Atkins hand, which Atkins said was from an accident involving a chain saw in his garden). Pereira noticed that the fire pit had been used overnight but was no longer burning. Atkins told Pereira not to come outside, as he wanted to make the garden nice for her. Later in the day, Pereira stated she looked out the window and saw Atkins 'sawing wood' with a saw approximately 50 cm x 20 cm. She noted that the fire pit had also been used. Atkins made reference to burning some blue shoes he owned, stating that he was doing so as he did not like them. She saw that Atkins had large black bin liners, bleach and silver tape. Pereira stated that she thought Atkins was tidying up the garden, describing the scene as 'lovely'.

Pereira added that later in the day, Atkins had gone shopping on quite a few occasions, stating that Atkins had wanted to get bleach and tape in order to paint the utility room. Pereira stated that Atkins bought bin linters and tape and she noted that the bin liners were larger than the ones they needed. Later, Pereira also went shopping, wanting chocolate from Poundland, as well as going to Cash Creators. Having sold Shotton's phone, Pereira stated that the pair used the money to buy drugs.

Having purchased the drugs, the pair returned to their address. Pereira told police that Atkins later spent further time in the afternoon burning things. She added that she had not been into the garden since the morning she checked on the tent where Shotton had stayed.

=== 3 September ===
==== Covert recording of Atkins and Pereira's conversation in police van ====
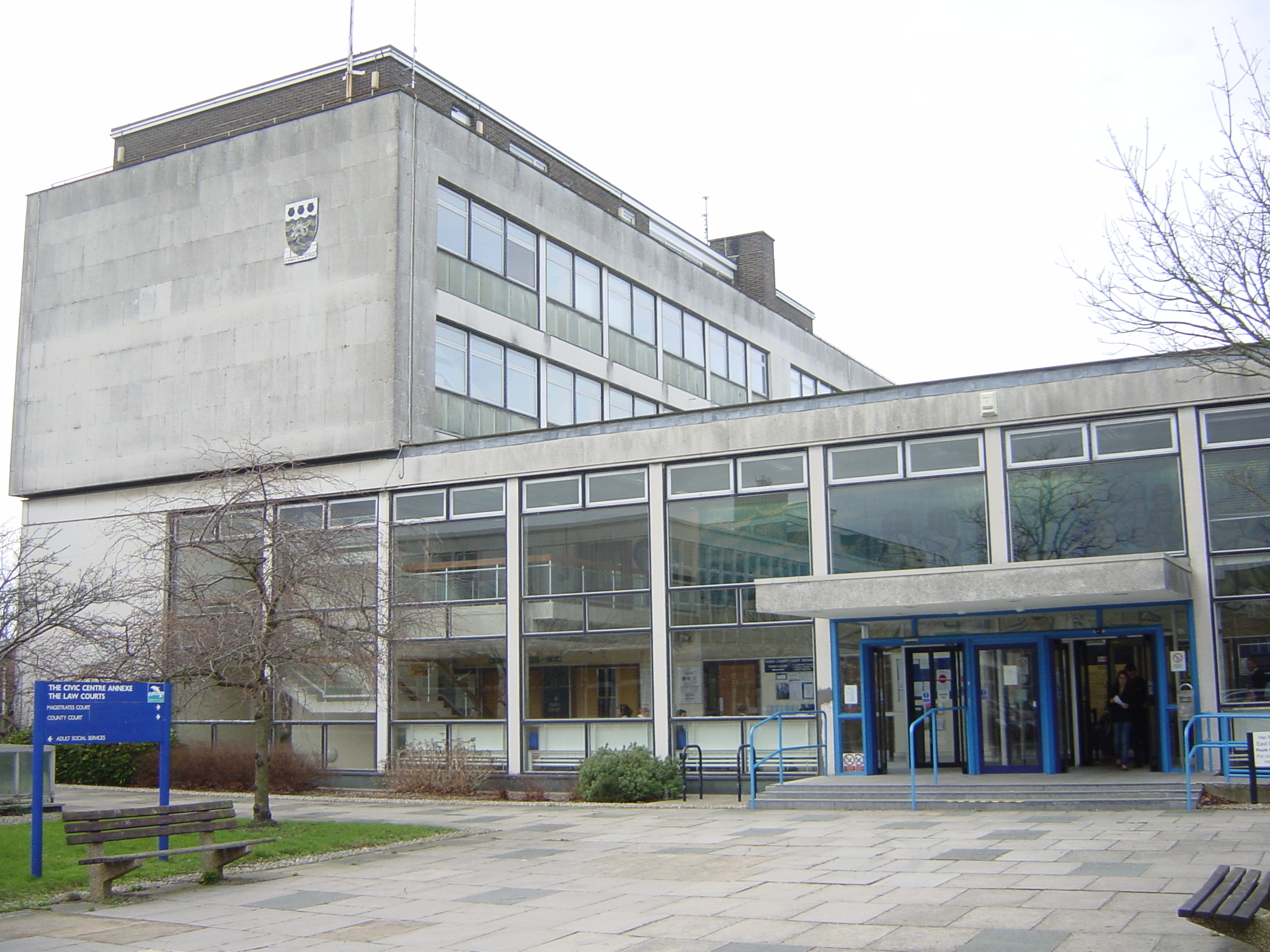
Atkins and Pereira were covertly recorded discussing Shotton in a police van, en-route to Poole Magistrates' Court (pictured)

Requiring further time to interview Atkins and Pereira, police took the pair to Poole Magistrates' Court on 3 September where an application for further detention was to be made under section 43 of the Police and Criminal Evidence Act 1984.

En-route to the court, Atkins and Pereira, who were placed in the same police van, which featured a covert listening device, had their conversations recorded. This also picked them up breaking wind on a number of occasions, which was thought to be a combination of drug withdrawal and the medication they were on. This was the first time since they had been able to speak to one another since their arrest.

Atkins was heard to tell Pereira that it was 'illegal' for the police to interview her whist she was withdrawing from methadone.

Atkins was heard to remark how just before the time of their arrest, they were about to leave when the police crashed through their gate. He asked Pereira if she knew why he had gone into the garden, with Pereira replying: "Did you have the legs there?" Atkins replied: "I went into the garden to get rid of the fucking arms", before he was heard laughing. Pereira responded: "Yeah, I knew you were tryna..."

Later, Atkins was heard to tell Pereira to keep "playing that story out to the end".

Having arrived outside of the court, Pereira later asked Atkins: "do you regret anything?" Atkins responded, stating: "I'll look 'em straight in the eye and say, yeah. I'd do it again and again and again. If you let me go today, I'd find another one and do it again. Drug dealers, and pushers. Kill, decapitate, and eat the fucker."

Pereira told Atkins that police had taken samples from underneath her fingernails, with Atkins remarking that she would not have had anything there, with "the amount of bleach you used". He told Pereira to answer any further questions with no comment.

Appearing at the magistrates' court, the time was extended for questioning to continue.

==== Further interviews ====
In further interviews, Atkins continued to answer with "no comment".

===== Pereira provides 'no comment' =====
At approximately 17:45 on 3 September, Pereira was interviewed for a third time. Police pointed out inconsistencies with her first two interviews and on beginning to ask questions regarding the layout of her house and garden, Pereira began to answer with no comment to some of the questions asked. This included police asking Pereira about a 'towel wrapped package' within the garden. Pereira ignored the officer's questions, until responding when asked whether it smelt. She told police: "I will say I didn't smell anything". Police pointed out that a clump of hair had been located within the garden, which Pereira responded: "It looks like my hair, but I had nothing to do with that [discovery of Shotton's severed arms]. My hair gets everywhere. I empty out the hoover in the back garden, so you'd find more hair all around my garden. I can tell you that now." Having been told that Shotton's remains were found within a package leaning up against the back door of the utility room, Pereira responded that she did not put the package there. Asked who had, she replied: "Not me", stating that she did not know who had.

===== Pereira admits to a conversation in the police van =====
At this point, Pereira asked for a break to speak to her solicitor. Having had a short consultation with her solicitor, Pereira told police that she and Atkins had spoken in the back of the police van, noting how he was "Fine, Absolutely fine. No emotion. Just saying that he loved me. That was it. No crying, nothing."

Pereira told police that Atkins had asked her what she had said in interview, with her telling him she was not allowed to talk to him about it. Atkins told her to answer with no comment, stating that he had told her he had spoken to his solicitor and that if she went 'no comment' alongside him, she would be put on remand, but only for around nine months. This included how she had asked Atkins whether he had killed Shotton, to which Atkins replied: "yeah". She stated that Atkins had told her that God had told him to kill Shotton. She added that Atkins had pulled her close to him in the van and told her he had asked his solicitor that if he admitted what he did, stating he cooked Shotton's head and ate his cheeks, would that get Pereira 'off the hook', however, the solicitor had said it still would not and that Pereira would still be charged. Pereira stated she was not sure whether Atkins had done what he had said, noting that he had been saying some 'weird stuff'. She remarked that Atkins had told her he needed to go 'in front of the big courts' and that when he did, he would admit that: "I've done it".

Pereira told police that Atkins had told her that he had "got rid of him [Shotton]", after riding a bike to Shelley Manor, a pharmacy in Boscombe, where he killed Shotton. Pereira stated that she told Atkins she did not want to know, with Atkins repeating that he loved her. She added that Atkins had gone to the Manor Steps zig zag and put packages containing Shotton's legs there, placing them near the footpath where someone would find them, due to them being decomposed. She told police that Atkins had told her not to worry and that everything would be fine, with him telling 'big court' about it.

Pereira told police: "I'm just really scared. He was my partner. I can't be with someone that's killed someone. I cant. I fucking can't", as well as saying: "I can't be with a fucking murderer. I can't be with a fucking murderer, Jesus".

When asked what she knew, had seen and what she had done in recent weeks, Pereira told police that she had in fact been out, had been meeting Shotton and that he had been staying with her and Atkins, admitting to lying about what she had said in previous interviews. Pereira stated that Shotton had stayed at her address for two weeks before his death from the beginning of August. She stated that between 08:00 or 09:00 BST until 20:00 or 21:00 BST, Shotton would sell drugs and that he was being "worked fucking hard". Originally, Atkins had told Shotton that he could stay with him and Pereira after he was kicked out of the derelict B&B on Manor Road. Pereira stated that she knew Atkins did not like Shotton or the arrangement of him living at the address on the agreement he sorted the couple drugs; Atkins felt as if Shotton was not giving the couple enough drugs in exchange for being allowed to stay at their address, noting how Atkins did not like how Shotton was "just taking the piss with the drugs", not paying them enough. She noted that whilst he would 'sort' her and Atkins out 'a bit' [with drugs], some nights he arrived and said he could not. She stated that he'd then be up all of the night using drugs himself.

Pereira added that she only discovered Atkins had killed Shotton earlier that morning, when he told her in the police van. She told police how on asking Atkins what the cuts on his hands were from, that he had told her it was due to a fight that he had with Shotton in the garden of the address. She stated she noticed these injuries, as well as a big bruise on Atkins ribs a few days before the time she finally saw Shotton. Pereira told police that there had been a few arguments between Shotton and Atkins, but she had not witnessed any physical arguments or fights. She added that Atkins had previously asked Shotton to leave the address.

She told police that Shotton was waiting to be picked up by a friend, a drug dealer, who would be arriving in his van to collect Shotton. She noted that this was approximately three or four days before she sold Shotton's phone.

Pereira changed her account again, stating that the last time she saw Shotton was in the living room, where Atkins had begun to shout at him for not giving enough drugs. She later stated that when Atkins drank: "He can be not very nice." Pereira stated that Atkins and Shotton were having words and how she had kept quiet, noting she had told Atkins that "The men have gotta deal with it." She stated that Shotton 'looked scared' and that she had told him he had to go. She noted that Shotton had said that "He always wants more", in relation to Atkins wanting more drugs from him as part of the arrangement. She added how Atkins had walked into the room, asking Shotton: "Where's out bits", with Shotton ignoring him. Shotton was sat on the other side of a sofa, before Atkins stood over him, shouting that Shotton had to be gone by the morning. This resulted in Pereira pulling Atkins away, telling him to calm down, before the couple went to bed together. In the morning, Pereira stated she awoke to find that Shotton had gone and Atkins told her that Shotton's friend had collected him, describing Atkins as appearing 'agitated'.

She added that Atkins did not have cuts on his hand at that point, with Pereira noticing these around a day or two afterwards. Pereira added that one morning, she had asked Atkins where the cuts on his hands were from, with him stating they had been caused by him cutting wood in the garden and burning fires. She told police that Atkins did not want her in the garden due to him causing fires and that she could not see what he was doing as she was inside with the door shut, not wanting smoke to enter her address.

Police asked Pereira that between Shotton going missing and her discovering the cuts on Atkins' hands, how many times there had been a fire or how long a fire was burning for. Pereira replied: "About five days". She stated that whilst she could not see him chopping wood, she had heard him sawing, having returned from Wilkinsons with a saw, approximately a day or two after Shotton had left.

Within her interview, Pereira stated she heard Atkins sawing in the garden, hearing him around a couple of days after Shotton had left. She added that she had heard Atkins 'sawing and sawing' up to around Monday or Tuesday. She denied any involvement in Shotton's death or the dismemberment or concealment of his body, later adding that she had not witnessed or played any part in this, including storing or disposing of his remains. She stated that Shotton's remains had not been stored within the tent in the garden or utility room and that she did not know both where he had been dismembered or where the rest of his remains were.

Pereira added that on that day, Atkins had purchased bin liners to clear the garden and tape for him to use whilst painting the utility room. She added that he had also purchased bleach, as well as disinfectant, as she liked to put it with her washing. Alongside these items, Atkins had also bought sweets, chocolate and M&M's.

Pereira stated that she had not been in the utility room around this time and had not been able to see within it, as Atkins had put up a towel over the door, telling her that he was going to paint it and make a surprise for her.

Pereira added that Atkins was 'always out there' [in the garden] and had caused a number of fires, telling police that they could check this with her neighbour.

Police, having spoken to neighbours, found that there had been a number of bonfires around the time of Shotton's death. One neighbour stated that in late August, the week before the police arrested Atkins and Pereira, they had noticed a 'strange bonfire' and 'noises of a chainsaw'. One neighbour stated that one bonfire had an 'awful, putrid smell' on two evenings between 26 and 29 August, whilst another smelt a bonfire on 19 August that they thought smelt of 'burning flesh', later finding that between approximately 21 and 25 August, his wheelie bins smelt like 'off meat', as if 'someone had put off meat in the bin'. On a day between 23 and 25 August, Atkins had asked that neighbour to borrow some magnolia paint, stating that his nephew had been drawing on the walls and he wanted to paint over the drawing.

Another neighbour stated that on a day 'between 24 and 29 August', he had arrived home from work at around 19:00 BST, whereby over the next hour, he could hear a person sawing and could hear 'several loud cracks'. Having heard a cracking sound, the neighbour saw a male throwing something onto a fire pit. They assumed it was furniture that had been broken up, but did not see any furniture in the garden.

Another neighbour stated that a bonfire had been alight between 27 and 31 August.

Another person, visiting a neighbour immediately next door to Atkins and Pereira stated that during August, he had noticed Atkins had lit a bonfire that was lit continuously for approximately 3 to 4 days, asking the neighbour he was visiting as to what they were burning. He noticed a smell of petrol that was 'overwhelming' and later an 'awful smell', liked 'some sort of decomposing animal or body' causing him to shout over the fence to Atkins as to what he was burning. Atkins replied that he was burning a dead fox which he'd located.

Asked about the events of the day that Shotton's phone had been sold, just after 17:30 BST on 18 August, Pereira stated that she had been out with Atkins to the pharmacy, but was unsure whether it was her pharmacy or his, adding she was 'guessing'. She stated that she thought they had gone to the Poundshop and Poundstretcher before going to Cash Creators, where having sold Shotton's mobile phone, had both gone to score drugs.

In relation to the phone, Pereira stated that Atkins had told her that he had found it after Shotton had left. Pereira stated that she had not sold or gotten rid of any other items belonging to Shotton.

Pereira stated that over the following weeks, of exactly two weeks and two days, between Shotton's iPhone being sold and her and Atkins' arrest, she and Atkins had not spent a lot of time together, with Atkins spending time in the garden. She added that Atkins had been 'talking a lot about God', remarking how "God makes him do this, God makes him do that", describing this as "Very weird". She added that Atkins had previously told her that God had told him to get rid of all the drug dealers as "They're all evil".

She stated that during the time, Atkins had been burning stuff for 'most days' and that she had been in the utility room on one occasion to do washing, but had not noticed anything in the room.

Regarding a pair of Atkins' trainers that she had mentioned in a previous interview, Pereira stated that Atkins had told her he needed to get rid of them as he did not like them anymore. Pereira stated that she thought that they were still in her address, despite having told police she thought he had burnt them, when interviewed the day previously. She added that the reason for this was that she could not be sure, adding that Atkins may have burnt the shoes or that they still may be in her address.

After a short break, police told Pereira that they were concerned that she still had not told them the 'whole truth', having provided a third version of events within the last two days. They added how Pereira was 'withholding things' and how there were things that did not 'tally up'. They stated that Pereira's credibility had been 'diminished somewhat' by her accounts changing. Pereira agreed, adding: "But this morning I actually got to speak to Benny [Atkins], which was different."

===== Police challenge Pereira on her accounts =====
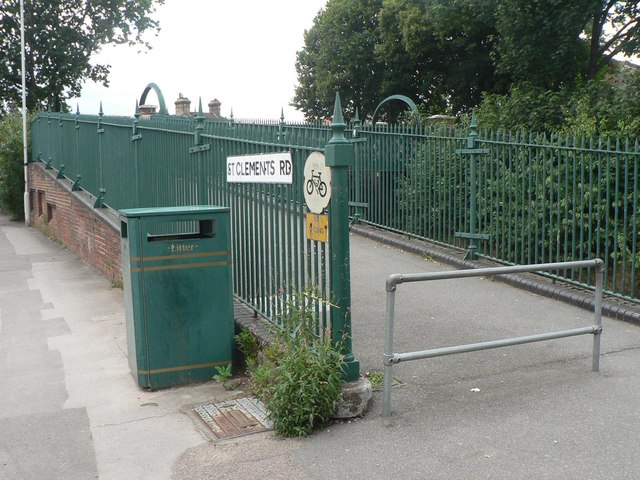
A railway footbridge at the beginning of one end of St Clement's Road, where it meets with Palmerston Road, Boscombe

Going over events, police stated that they had established with Pereira that the night Shotton went missing, Pereira had told them that Atkins had been with her and they'd slept together in bed, before she had woken up the next morning to find him making a cup of tea. However, police then showed CCTV from a camera showing the view along Walpole Road towards Boscombe Crescent, of a person on a bike, leaving Randolph Road. The rider takes the bike through the Crescent, along Christchurch Road, turning left into Palmerston Road, before going up towards Saint Clements Road. Pereira stated that she did not know who the person was, before seeing footage from another camera and stating that it was Atkins. Police confirmed that it was him, from tattoos visible on his arms. The CCTV showed Atkins on the bike, out at 04:23 BST on the early hours of the morning. Police told Pereira that further footage showed Atkins meeting with someone else, before going through town and back to Pereira's address. They challenged Pereira, stating that he had not spent the night in bed with her and that she 'knew that'.

Police put it to Pereira that Atkins already had Shotton's mobile phone and had been using it to make calls, which was the same handset that Pereira had admit to putting her SIM card into, days later. Pereira stated again that Atkins had told her that he had found it. Police challenged Pereira again, stating: "But you know he hasn't found it. You know he's taken that from Simon when Simon's been killed". Pereira replied: "No, I didn't."

Police put further CCTV to Pereira, of her in Cash Creators, with the couple both sweating. She was asked to account what she was doing and told police that she was selling Shotton's phone. However, police told her that she was not selling the phone, as given the timing, this occurred five and a half hours later. Pereira stated that she was selling a power bank, but police tell her that she was selling two 'deck things' that they had found. Police asked where the items (a hot glue gun and solder) were from. Pereira stated that they belonged to Shotton and that he had left them at the address. Police reminded Pereira that they had asked her this earlier, with Pereira stating: "I know, and I forgot". Police told her that it was another opportunity and time where Pereira had not told the truth, adding that it was another example of police going through evidence, revealing more information, only for Pereria to alter her account. They added that it meant that it was less likely for the police to believe her, with the evidence now saying otherwise as well.

Police asked Pereira whether her and Atkins had returned to the derelict B&B where Shotton was previously staying to collect his property and sell it, to which Pereira denied, telling them to check CCTV.

Police then spoke to Pereira about what could be heard on CCTV at Cash Creators. Police stated that in their opinion that the name 'Peter' or the word 'people' is heard, before "They don't know what happened to him. They ain't got a fucking clue". Pereira denied this was what could be heard, stating that she had heard something about keys. Police put it to her that she and Atkins were talking about the murder of Shotton. Pereira responded: "No no no no no no no no. I'm not having that."

Police then put more CCTV to Pereira, from a camera looking across from St John's Road, into Boscombe Crescent. They told Pereira that the footage was from 09:38 BST on the morning of 18 August, three hours before the couple were in Cash Creators selling Shotton's soldering gun and ten hours before they sold his iPhone. A male is seen to appear from Aylesbury Road, appearing to be carrying a bin bag or sack, with something rectangular within it. Pereira confirmed to police that the man was Atkins. Police asked what he was doing and when Pereira replied that she did not know, they retorted: "You do know though, that's the problem". Pereira replied: "I don't know. I don't. I don't", before police tell her: "I don't think that's good enough anymore I'm afraid Debs." Pereira responded, stating: "No, I don't know. I'm not a fucking murderer. I'm not a murderer, I don't help people murder people. I'm not a murderer." Police put it to Pereira that even if she did not kill Shotton, she helped and was in the flat when Shotton was killed, which Pereira denied.

Police referred to a text that Shotton to Atkins regarding him having money by the time he got back home that now put a 'completely different spin' on Pereira's account for the relationship and behaviour between her, Atkins and Shotton. Pereira agreed but stated that it was nothing to do with her, but Atkins.

Police put it to Pereira that her and Atkins had been ripping Shotton off for drugs, building up a debt and letting him down and that this was the reason for a 'violent incident' occurring, where Shotton was killed. Pereira denied all of this.

Police put it to Pereira that she was covering for Atkins, minimising her role and knowledge of what occurred. Pereira responded: "I'm not covering for him. I fucking said like there he's told me that he's fucking done this."

Police referred to texts from Shotton's mobile in which he had arranged with friends to stay elsewhere, implying that he did not want Atkins and Pereira to know he was going. Police told Pereira that it was the exact opposite of what she had told them, with Pereira agreeing, but stating that in the beginning, she had got along with Shotton. Police stated that it was a 'completely different dynamic' to the one that Pereira had presented, adding that there was upset with Shotton, yet it seemed he was upset with them and that when being asked to leave, he was attempting to make arrangements to do so. Pereira stated that it was Atkins who was asking him to leave and not her, where police have reminded her that she had told them that she had told them that she wanted Shotton to leave. Pereira agreed, before stating that it was Atkins that in the end, really wanted Shotton to go.

Police tell Pereira that she knew and was present when Shotton was murdered, before she played a part in 'destroying, concealing evidence' and 'disposing on his remains'. Pereira denied all of this.

Police continued, stating that Atkins had returned to the address close to the time Shotton was killed, had an argument over money and their relationship, Pereira stealing drugs and Shotton being taken advantage of, before Shotton was killed. After this, police told Pereira they thought she was in the flat when this occurred and that Shotton's body had been stored and cut up at the address. They asked Pereira where she had kept Shotton's remains from the time of his death to his legs being disposed at the Overcliff. Pereira stated: "I haven't had nothing to do with that". Police continued, adding that Shotton's arms were located by the back door of her address. Pereira told police she did not know where Shotton's head and torso were when asked.

Police stated that if Pereira had not murdered Shotton or laid a finger on him, then the evidence suggested that she was present and within the flat when he had been killed. Pereira challenged this, stating that she would have heard the murder take place, with police stating that she would have seen it. Asking how, police replied: "Because it's in your one bed flat. Benny's [Atkins] come home after 8 o'clock, there's been an argument and Simon's been killed." Again, Pereira denied this.

Regarding Pereira telling police she had not been going into the garden or into the utility room, police challenged Pereira that Shotton had been in the utility room 'the whole time', which she denied. She denied that he had been dismembered in the address, but police retorted that it was highly unlikely that Atkins had 'carried a dead man down the street' and dismembered Shotton elsewhere. Pereira stated: "But I would have know if it was in my utility room", with police telling her: "If you've not actively played a part in the murder of Simon, it's impossible for you not to have played a part in the covering up of his murder and disposal of his body". Again, Pereira denied knowing anything about this. Police told Pereira: "You've perverted the course of justice. You and Benny have done some horrific things to Simon after his brutal death. That is the only explanation." Pereira replied: "No, no."

Police told Pereira: "Simon is a man who at some stage you got along with. He's going to have relatives who, if nothing else, deserve to know what's happened to the rest of his body." Pereira replied: "And I don't know. I promise you, I don't know. I don't know." The interview is then concluded.

=== 4 September ===
==== Atkins and Pereira are charged with murder ====
On 4 September, Atkins and Pereira were charged with Shotton's murder, perverting the course of justice and preventing the burial of a corpse. They appeared at Poole magistrates' court the following day.

=== 6 September ===
==== Discovery of torso ====
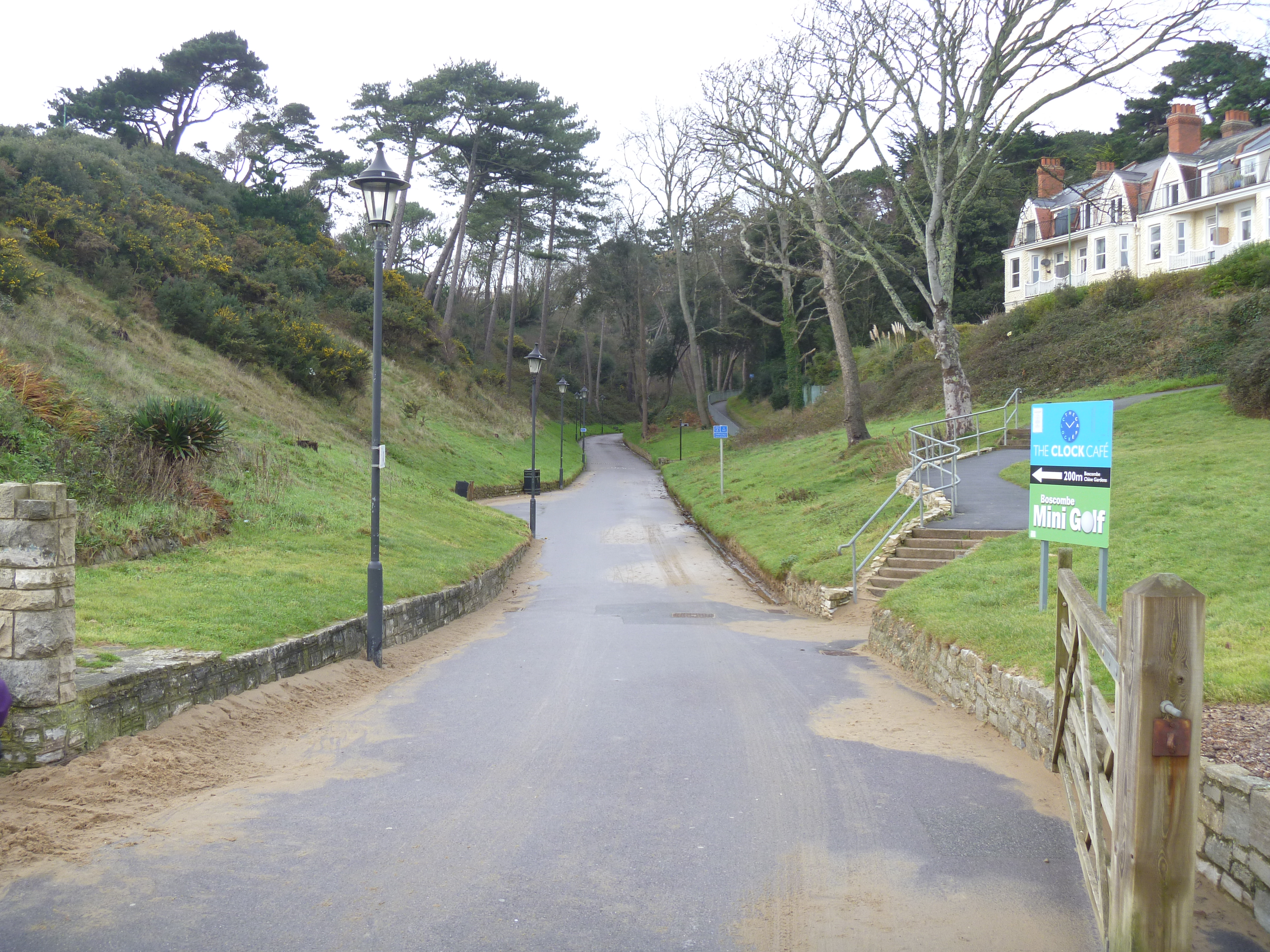
The seafront entrance to the gardens, where a suitcase containing Shotton's headless torso was discovered in a hedgerow

On 6 September, police were continuing a massive search operation in order to locate Shotton's missing torso and head. Their searches expanded from the original scene to the wider Bournemouth area, including Boscombe Chine Gardens, where a police licensed search team searched undergrowth.

Whilst there, at approximately 10:53 BST, an officer walking on the left hand side of the path on a raised embankment smelt a faint smell, of which he 'recognised the distinctive smell of death'. Whilst searching the immediate area, he could not find the cause of the smell, before he stepped onto another raised embankment, where he could smell 'death' intermittently.

Having notified his team leader what he could smell and the area it was emanating from, the officer saw a black bag within a hedgerow. Entering the hedgerow by approximately 1 metre, the officer saw flies on and surrounding a black suitcase. On retrieving the suitcase by pulling it out by its wheels, the officer faced a 'stench of death' that was 'immediate and intense'. On further looking at the suitcase, it looked as it if contained something heavy and the bottom of the case was wet, with maggots and eggs on it.

Crime Scene Investigators (CSI) arrived at the scene and discovered a headless human torso, that was packaged within the suitcase.

Having discovered the further remains of Shotton, police appealed to the public as to anyone who had seen someone with a black suitcase or anyone who saw suspicious activity in the area between 18 August and 1 September.

The vicinity where Shotton's torso was found had previously been the same location of another killing, when James Cutting was stabbed to death on 30 June 2020.

=== 18 February ===
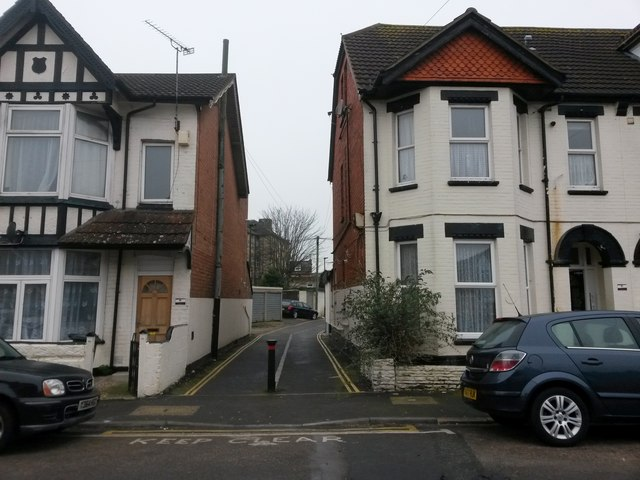
Walpole Lane, Boscombe, where fragments of Shotton's skull were discovered

At a hearing at Winchester Crown Court on 18 February, following advice from his legal team, Atkins provided a defence statement. He claimed that Shotton had attacked him with a bread knife, with Atkins grabbing the knife and, as a result, sustained a wound to his right hand. During this attack, Atkins claimed that the pair tussled and wrestled with the bread knife, with Atkins sustaining a second wound to his left hand, above his wrist. Atkins admitted to burning Shotton's head and disposing 'fragments' on Walpole Lane, an alleyway near to Aylesbury Road. Representatives of Atkins provided police a number of images that identified garages on Walpole Lane at which Atkins was said to have deposited part of Shotton's skull.

=== 28 February ===
==== Discovery of skull fragments ====
On 28 February, police carried out a search of Walpole Lane in Boscombe, where they discovered what may have been 'fragments' of a skull. The size of the fragments were such that a detective later noted 'a normal person walking along the road would probably miss them'. It was reported that 'some items' were located near to garages, which were sent for analysis, which found some to be human bone. All of Shotton's head has never been recovered.

== Post mortem and other scientific investigations ==
=== Pathologist evaluation ===
Dr Deborah Cook, a Home Office registered pathologist, conducted post mortem examinations on Shotton's remains. These took place at various times (due to Shotton's remains being located over various weeks and months), with Dr Cook's final report being prepared on 27 October 2023. Dr Cook was not able to provide a definitive time of death.

Two post mortem examinations were undertaken, firstly of the legs, before a further examination of the arms and torso. Samples were also taken from the suitcases, packages and tape that had been used to conceal the body parts, with Dr Cook having attended the scene of where Shotton's legs were discovered. These were found to have been contaminated with 'decompositional fluid, fatty deposits and maggots'.

Dr Cook found that there was nothing that indicated Shotton had died of natural causes and that the amputations had occurred after death. She added that there was no identifiable injury to Shotton's torso that would have caused his death.

==== Examination of legs ====
On 27 August 2023, during the post mortem examination of the legs, the Dr Cook determined that they appeared to be from the same person (Shotton) and that the amputations appeared amateur, indicating that the removal of the legs was not done as part of surgery or something that had 'come out of an operating theatre', noting that the nature of the cutting marks were 'not correct'. Dr Cook could only conclude that she had seen the use of a saw in dismemberment before. The points at where Shotton's legs had been removed meant that they were cut through skin, muscle and bone.

Dr Cook found that the loss of skin and maggots around Shotton's left leg was 'natural with decomposition', indicating that an amputation had not occurred the day before. On Shotton's left leg, Dr Cook noted that very close to a cut line where the skin ended, there were a 'number of short parallel in sized cuts', something that had been made with a knife, determining that it was this instrument that had been used to cut through the skin and muscle, but that this would not have been a sort available in a kitchen. Whilst Dr Cook was not able to provide further detail about how Shotton's muscle had been divided, she noted that it 'wasn't entirely clean', with 'striations and notching' on the bone, in addition to the end that had been cut.

Dr Cook provided similar findings having examined Shotton's right leg, adding how there were 'fine scratch marks on the bone', which showed that 'a knife had glided across the surface of the bone but hadn't gone through it deeply'.

==== Examination of torso ====
Dr Cook established that the decapitation wound started from the front around to the back and was 'not a single clean path of the knife', therefore meaning it would not have been 'just one cut'. The cut was above the windpipe and gullet, with a skin flap that measured 6 cm indicating that there had not been a clear cut through. However, the spine had been cut directly through a bone, not the disk space.

Regarding Shotton's torso, Dr Cook confirmed that there were fluids on the suitcase that it had been located within, indicating 'bodily decomposition', with a 'number of maggots' also present within.

On Shotton's back were two incised wounds, two superficial cuts, one superficial incised cut and one incised cut. In total, Shotton had 12 sharp force injuries to his torso, clustered at the top back of his left shoulder. Five of these penetrated through Shotton's skin.

A cut had been made close to Shotton's collarbone, which Dr Cook stated may have been caused at the same time Shotton's head was removed, however, she could not be certain that this had not been caused 'in an incident around the time of death'.

Dr Cook noted an injury at the top of Shotton's shoulder, with the wound running from front to back. The wound passed into the muscle that curves up the top of the shoulder, but was less than 1 cm deep, with no 'vital structures' at the location. Dr Cook determined that it was an incised wound that had been made by a bladed weapon, such as a knife. Also at the top of Shotton's shoulder was a superficial incised cut, which had also been made with a bladed weapon that was 'probably' a knife. This wound had not broken through the full thickness of the skin and did not go into the muscle. Dr Cook noted a skin flap around the area, which had been caused by a knife that had 'raised up the skin'. Due to the amount of decomposition, Dr Cook was not able to determine whether these injuries had been caused before or after Shotton had died. However, comparing the injuries with the general healing process of wounds, Dr Cook was 'confident' that the wounds had been caused through an incident around the time Shotton had died or immediately after he had been killed. She determined that a knife or blade had entered parallel to Shotton's head.

Shotton also had two wounds on the upper part and left side of his back, between the neck and the tip of the shoulder. These were incised wounds, both of which went into the muscle. Dr Cook established that the wounds, no more than 3 cm in depth, would not be fatal. She found that a knife blade would have entered parallel to Shotton's head or 'front to back'.

On the left side of the back of Shotton's neck was an incised wound that had been made with a bladed weapon or knife, which Dr Cook determined was too close to the amputation of the head for her to provide details about the depth of the wound.

Due to their position, all but one of the wounds were not capable of having been caused by Shotton himself. It appeared that Shotton had been repeatedly stabbed multiple times with a small, sharp object.

==== Examination of arms ====
The arms had also been sawn off, in the middle of the shafts of long bones that attached each limb. There were no needle marks on the arms.

At the top of Shotton's right arm was a superficial cut, with the cut in the tissues underneath the skin, but not as far as muscle. Dr Cook described this as a 'sharp cut', that could have been caused by a knife.

On Shotton's right hand was a 8.5 cm slash mark across his palm, penetrating 4 cm into the muscle, as well as a number of other smaller cuts. Shotton's left wrist and hand contained a number of slash and cut injuries, with some having cut into the bones of the finger.

On Shotton's left arm, there was one superficial cut close to Shotton's wrist. Shotton had multiple wounds on his left hand, with five incised wounds, two parallel incised wounds, two deep incised wounds, two incised wounds, three single cuts and a possible incision. The deepest of all these wounds was a deep incised wound on Shotton's middle finger, that had cut into the bone.

The injuries to Shotton's hands were determined by Dr Cook to be 'defence type injuries' consistent of a person attempting to defend themselves against someone attacking them with a knife. Dr Cook stated that the injury applied to the cut on the forearm, stating that "if a knife comes towards you, you use the arm to shield yourself". Dr Cook stated that with the number of injuries that Shotton had, it did not indicate that he had only grabbed the knife once. However, these injuries could also, in theory, have been caused by a person injuring themselves with their hand slipping onto a blade. Dr Cook stated that of the wounds, a person would not bleed to death.

=== Forensic scientist evaluation ===
==== Examination of bone fragments ====
A forensic scientist concluded that 69 fragments they were provided with from Walpole Lane were bones. In his opinion, 15 of these were consistent with human bone, 6 were not human and the species could not be determined from 48 fragments. Of the bones identified as being from a human, these were from the cranium, however, the majority of the cranium, including the most robust part which would normally survive exposure from fire, were not present. The forensic scientist thought that the other fragments he thought were likely human showed signs of being exposed to heat. Out of all the pieces located, only two could be matched.

==== Examination of dismemberment methods ====
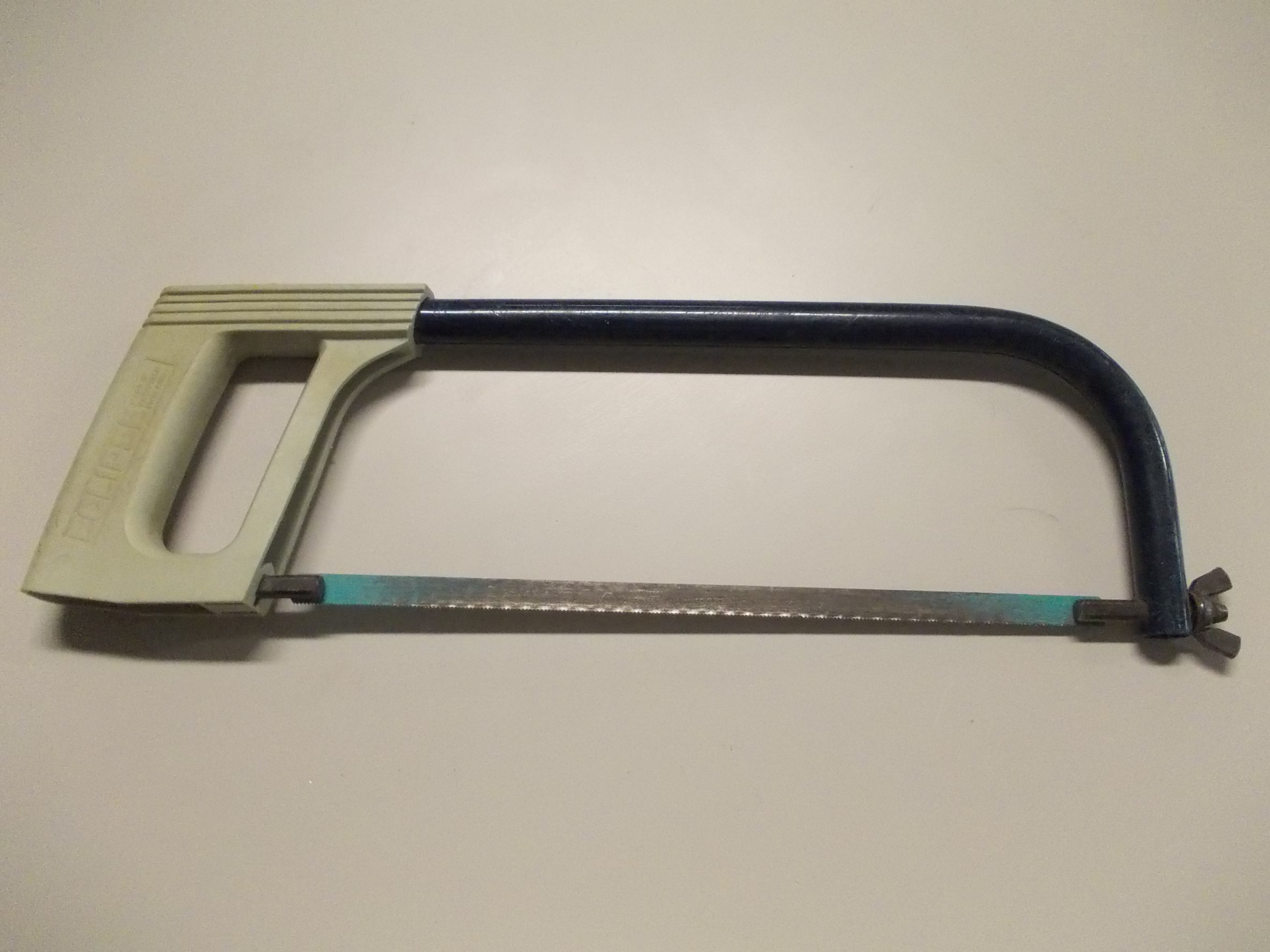
The type of saw that was used to cut up Shotton's body

A forensic scientist, who had expertise in the dismemberment of bodies and methods used to cut bones was provided with ends of Shotton's bones, where there had been cuts. These were from Shotton's neck and each arm and thigh. The forensic scientist was able to establish that the bones had been cut with a saw. They thought that the left leg had been cut from the back to the front, with the right leg having been cut from the side of the thigh through to the inner leg. The forensic scientist was not able to say the exact direction of the cutting of Shotton's arms.

Shotton's right femur, that was attached to his torso, had a series of grooves in several directions, indicating ten partial attempts to cut through the bone. There was a saw mark to Shotton's vertebrae in his neck, with the orientation determining that the cutting had been made from the front to the back of Shotton's neck.

It was noted that there were partial cuts into the bone, leaving a groove, which usually occurred prior to a 'main cut' being started. From that, it was determined that the type of saw had 'non pointed teeth like a hacksaw'.

The forensic scientist looked for details, such as the shape, tooth spacing and profile of the teeth of the blade and determined that the saw blade had a TPI (tooth per inch) of 24. This matched the a red saw, that police seized from Wilkos and that had been given to the forensic scientist, alongside a wood saw that had been seized from Atkins and Pereira's home address. Bone marks at the dismemberment sites on the bones were compared to the teeth on this type of hacksaw that Atkins or Pereira had stolen from Wilko on 19 August, with the forensic scientist being of the opinion that it was this type of Wilko saw, not the wood saw, that had been used to dismember Shotton's body.

== Trial ==
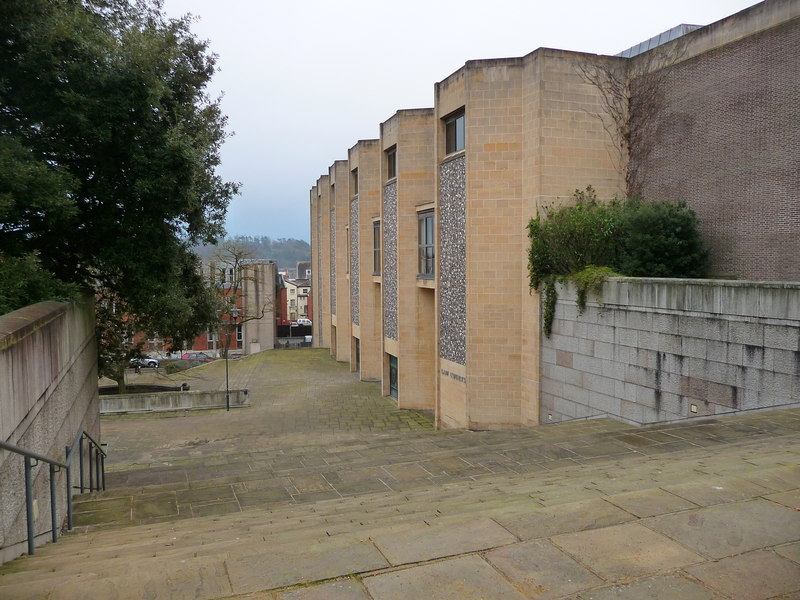
Winchester Crown Court

Atkins and Pereira's trial started on 11 April 2024 at Winchester Crown Court.

The trial was overseen by The Recorder of Winchester Her Honour Judge Angela Morris. The prosecution case was given by Paul Calvin KC and Sam Barker. For the defence, Zafar Ali KC represented Atkins, whilst Ignatius Hughes KC represented Pereira.

Atkins admitted to perverting the course of justice and preventing the burial of a corpse. On 20 October 2023, at a first full hearing at Bournemouth Crown Court, Atkins made what was described as a 'clear and unambiguous' admission that he was responsible for killing Shotton, as well as dismembering and disposing of his body parts. However, despite admitting responsibility, Atkins brought up a 'potential issue' of self defence and denied murder.

Pereira denied all three charges.

== Verdict ==
On 22 May 2024, having deliberated for 20 hours and 52 minutes, the jury found Atkins guilty of Shotton's murder by a majority of 11 to 1. They found Pereira not guilty of murder, but found her guilty by unanimous verdict of perverting the course of justice. In July of that year, Atkins was sentenced to life with a minimum term of 19 years while Pereira was sentenced to four years. Later in October, the pair had their sentences increase by two years each.
