= Freefall style =

Freefall style, also known simply as style, is a category of sport skydiving competition. Competitors aim to perform a predefined series of aerial maneuvers including front and back flips (loops), turns, and rolls in the least time. Competitors are timed for the length they take to perform the series of maneuvers. Penalty time is added to a competitor's score for incomplete or incorrect maneuvers. The competitor with the lowest time wins.

Freefall style is one of the oldest forms of sport skydiving competition, recognized by the Fédération Aéronautique Internationale in the 1960s. The first event to showcase the category was the 1962 World Championships in Orange.

Freefall style competition skydives are often coupled with Accuracy landing competition, and are commonly known as "style and accuracy" jumps.

== See also ==
- Freefall
- Parachuting
