= Here's Looking at You =

Here's Looking at You may refer to:

== Music ==
- Here's Lookin' at You, a 1956 album by Sammy Davis Jr.
- "Here's Looking at You", a 1936 song written by Ronnie Hill and sung by Helen McKay
- "Here's Looking at You", a 1979 post-punk song by Metropak
- "Here's Looking at You", a 1980 song by Blondie from the album Autoamerican
- "Here's Looking at You", a 1984 song by Bucks Fizz from the album I Hear Talk
- "Here's Looking at You", a 1989 tune by Keith LeBlanc from the album Strange Than Fiction
- "Here's Looking at You", a 1990 song by Teena Marie from the album Ivory
- "Here's Looking at You", a 1995 song written by Carroll Coates for Shirley Horn from the album The Main Ingredient
- "Here's Looking at You", a 1996 song by Charlie Haden from the album Now Is The Hour

== Television ==
- Here's Looking at You, a 1936 BBC variety TV show, see August 1936
- "Here's Looking at You" (TV episode), a 1987 episode of the TV series Seeing Things
- Here's Looking at You, a TV show within the 1990–1991 TV sitcom Going Places
- "Here's looking at you", a 1993 episode of the radio sitcom An Actor's Life For Me
- "Here's Looking at You", a 1993 episode of the TV series Frasier
- "Here's Looking at You!", a 2001 episode of the TV documentary series The Human Face

== Other ==
- Here's Looking at You: The Modern Slant on Smartness for the Junior Miss, a 1948 book by Emily Wilkens
- "Here's Looking at You", a newspaper column featured in the newspaper mX
- Here's Looking at You, a moose sculpture in Toronto, see List of Moose in the City

== See also ==
- Here's Looking at You Kid (disambiguation)
- Looking at You (disambiguation)
