= Yumeshima =

Artificial island in Osaka Bay, Japan

Coordinates: 34.652°N 135.388°E

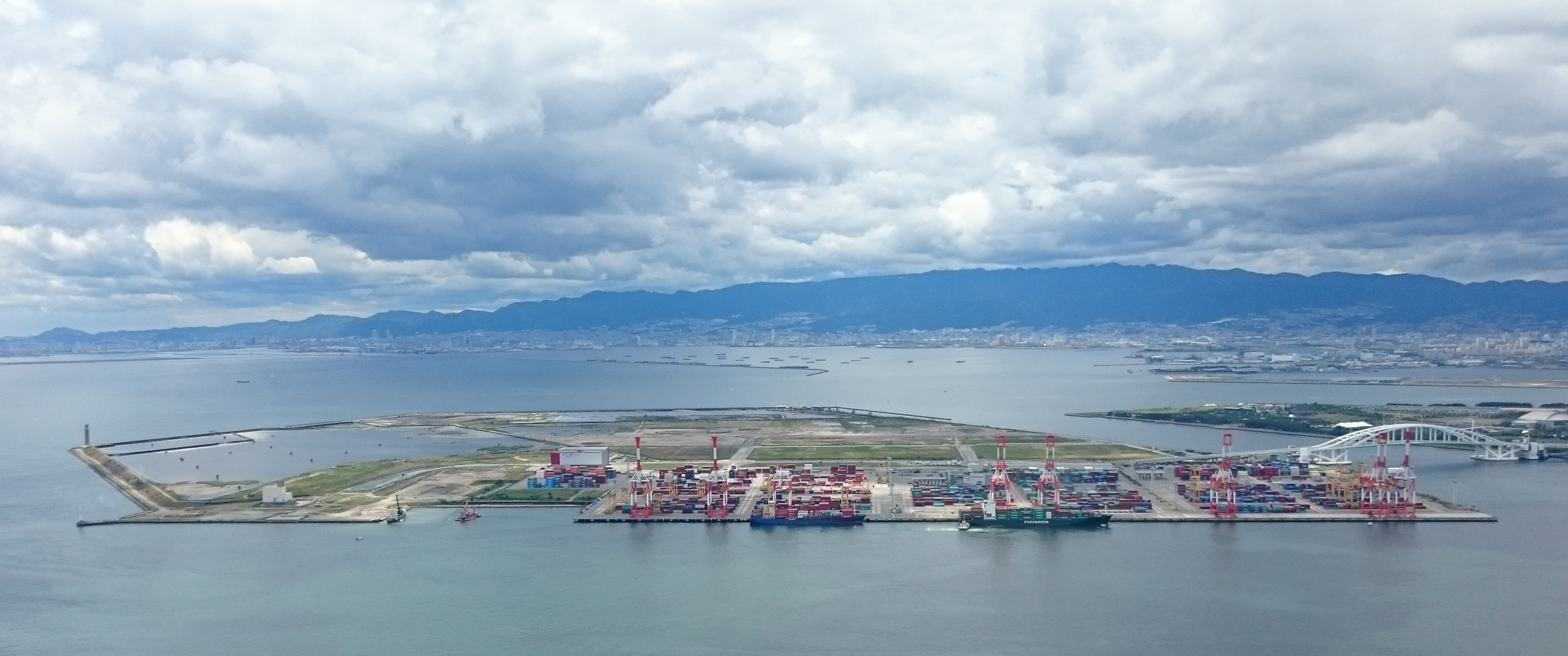
A full view of Yumeshima (2015)

Yumeshima (夢洲) is an artificial island in Osaka Bay. It is part of Konohana-ku (此花区), one of the 24 wards of Osaka, Japan. It is near the mouth of the Yodo River. When all the landfill is completed the total area will be 390 hectares (960 acres).

It was the site of Expo 2025, a World Expo which operated from April 13 to October 13, 2025.

== Overview ==
Yumeshima is located southwest of the island of Maishima, in the westernmost end of Osaka City. It is one of the three artificial island areas targeted by the “Technoport Osaka” plan formulated in 1988 with the aim of developing a new city center.

There are two high-standard container terminals with a depth of 15 meters in the south of Yumeshima, but most of the area is unoccupied. The southern end of Yumeshima is positioned as a logistics center. In the early 2000s, the island was proposed as the Olympic Village in Osaka's bid for the 2008 Summer Olympics.

=== Expo 2025 ===
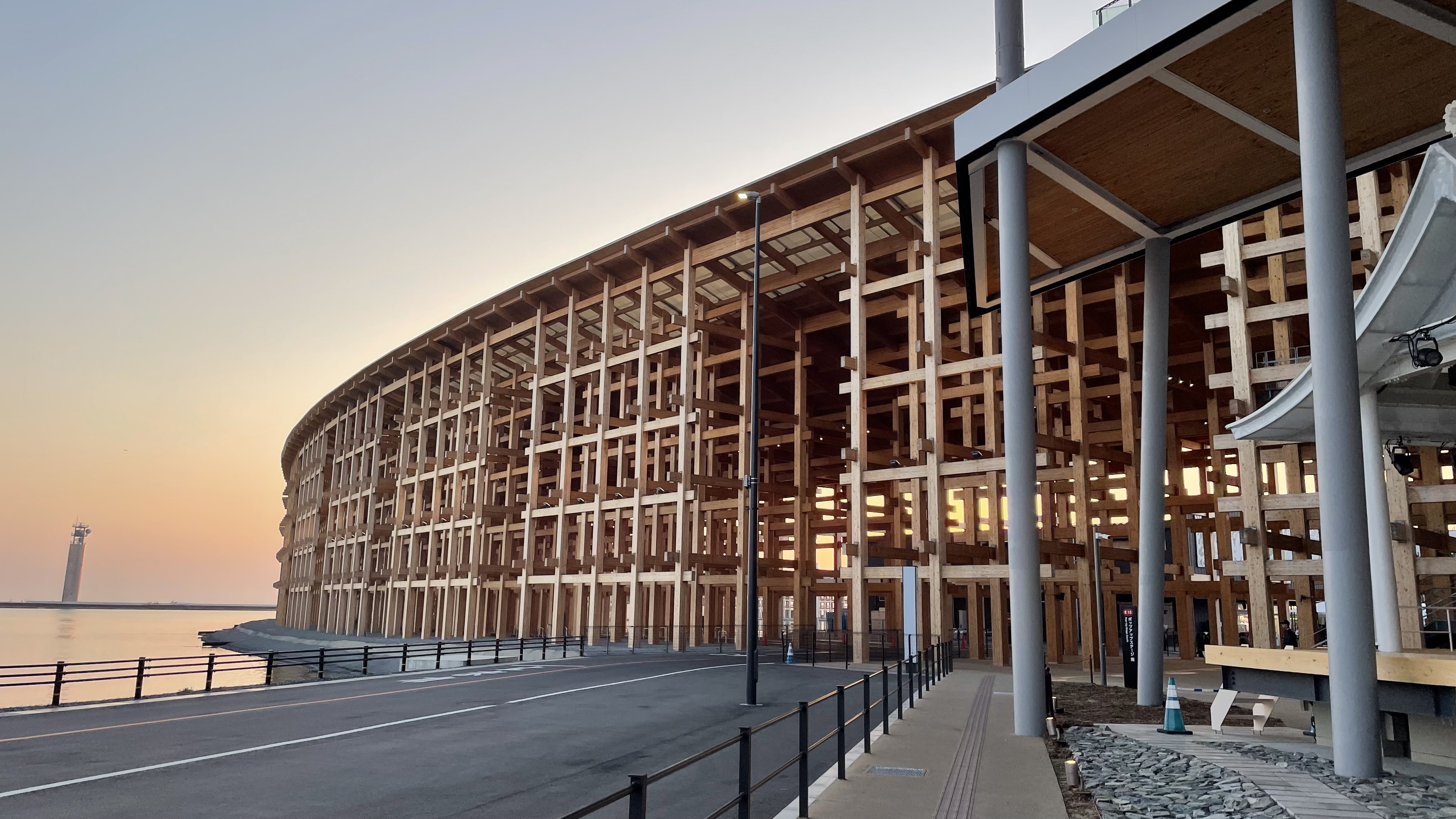
The Expo 2025 "Ring"

Osaka made its official bid for the 2025 World Expo on April 24, 2017. Yumeshima was a possible location. with the theme “Designing Future Society for Our Lives”. On November 23, 2018, Osaka won the ballot vote. Expo 2025 was held on the island.

=== MGM Osaka ===
In April 2014, Governor Ichirō Matsui of Osaka Prefecture announced that it would promote Yumeshima as a candidate site for an integrated resort (IR) with a casino. Yumeshima will be the location of MGM Osaka which will be the first integrated resort and commercial casino in Japan. Construction on the resort began in April of 2025.

== History ==
- Acquisition of landfill license in 1977. Start of development of waste disposal site.
- Started land creation project in 1991.
- 2002 Yumemai Bridge opened.
- Inauguration of the Yumeshima Container Terminal in 2002.
- 2009 Yume Saki tunnel (road section) opened.
- 2025: Expo 2025 begins and construction begins on MGM Osaka

== Transportation ==
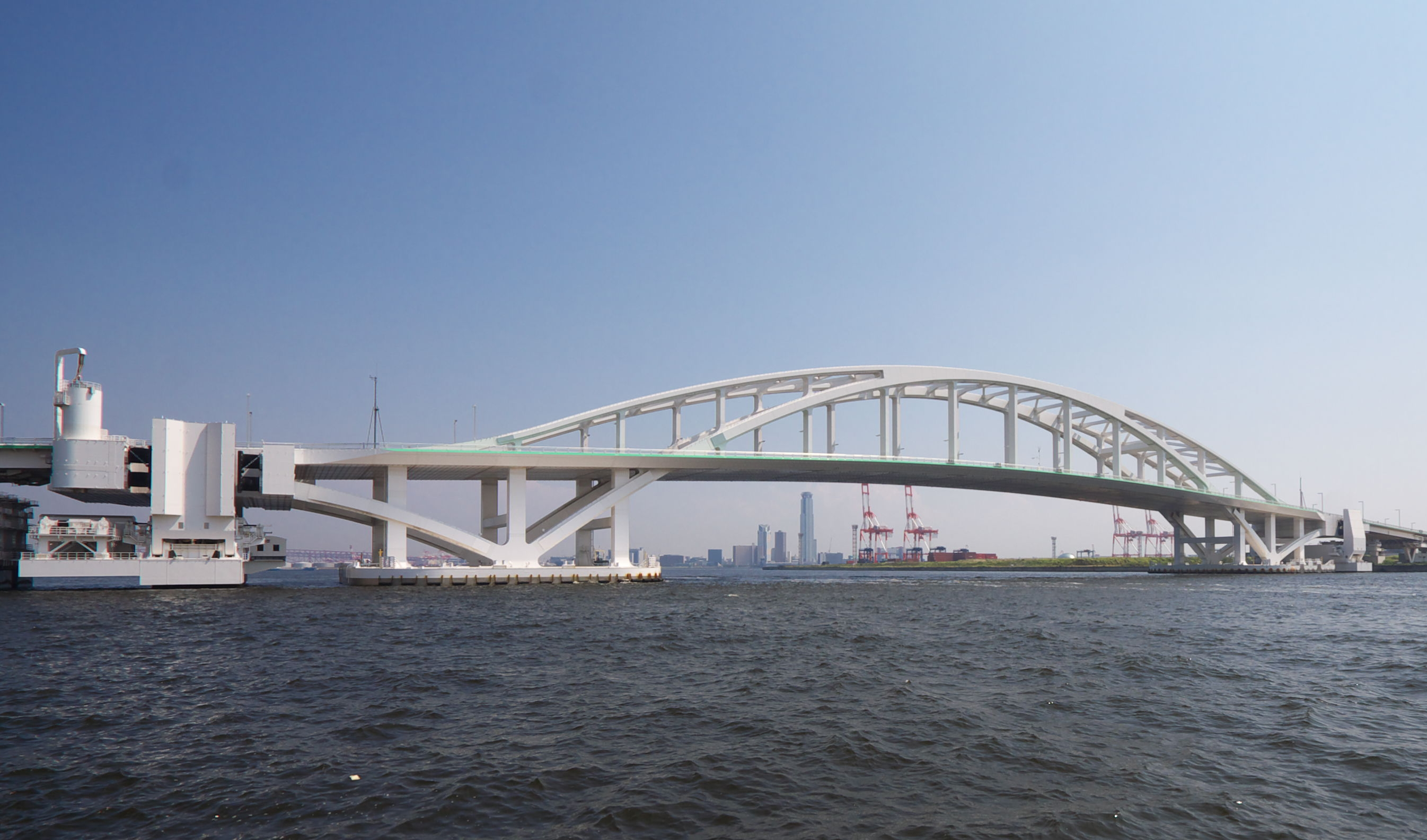
The Yumemai Bridge

Yumeshima Station is the terminus of the Osaka Metro Chūō Line. Yumeshima and Maishima are connected via the Yumemai Bridge. Yumeshima and Sakishima are connected with the Yumesaki Tunnel. No pedestrians or bicycles are allowed in the tunnel. There is public transportation with a sightseeing bus that stops at Cosmosquare Station.
