= Look at You =

Look at You may refer to:

== Songs ==
- "Look at You" (Big & Rich song), 2014
- "Look at You", a song and single by Backyard Babies, 1997
- "Look at You", a song by George McCrae
- "Look at You", a song by Hanson from the 1997 album Middle of Nowhere
- "Look at You", a song by Kenny Rogers from the 2013 album You Can't Make Old Friends
- "Look at You", a song by Rebecca Black from the 2023 album Let Her Burn
- "Look at You", a song by Screaming Trees from the 1996 album Dust

== See also ==
- Looking at You (disambiguation)
- Look at You Now (disambiguation)
- Look at Me (disambiguation)
- Look at Us (disambiguation)
