= Here's Looking at You Kid =

"Here's looking at you, kid" is a line spoken by Humphrey Bogart in the 1942 film Casablanca.

Here's Looking At You Kid may also refer to:

- "Here's Looking at You, Kid", a 1981 TV episode of the series The Greatest American Hero
- Here's Looking at You, Kid, a 1982 documentary telefilm that won an Emmy Award, part of the Nova (American TV program)
- "Here's Looking at You Kid", a 1983 song by John Pizzarelli from the album I'm Hip (Please Don't Tell My Father)
- "Here's Lookin' at You Kid", a 1993 song by April Wine off the album Attitude (April Wine album)
- "Here's Looking at You, Kid", a 2006 short story by Mike Resnick
- "Here's Looking at You, Kid", a 2008 song by The Gaslight Anthem off the album The '59 Sound
- "Here's Looking at You, Kid", a 2011 TV episode of the series My Ghost Story
- "Here's Looking at You Kid", a 2018 single by Brett Dennen
- "Here’s Looking at You, Kid", a 2019 radio episode of This American Life

== See also ==
- Looking at You (disambiguation)
- Here's Looking at You (disambiguation)
