= Looking at You =

Looking at You may refer to:

== Music ==
=== Albums ===
- Looking at You (album), a 1985 album by Chaz Jankel
- Looking at You, a 1968 album by Sandy Posey

=== Songs ===
- "Looking at You", a song by Cole Porter published in 1929, covered by Johnny Mathis and Mel Tormé among others
- "Across the Breakfast Table, Looking at You", a 1930 song by Irving Berlin for the musical Mammy, covered by Michael Feinstein as "Looking at You (Across the Breakfast Table)"
- "Looking at You" (MC5 song), 1970, on the album Back in the USA
- "Looking at You", a 1974 instrumental by David Jackson off the album The Long Hello
- "Looking at You" (Tom Robinson song), 1980 song by the band Sector 27 on the album Sector 27
- "Looking at You", a 1980 song by The Damned off the album The Black Album
- "Looking at You", a 1983 song by Cobra off the album First Strike
- "Looking at You", a 1985 song by Chaz Jankel off the eponymous album Looking at You
- "Looking at You", a 1996 song by Kate Ceberano off the album Blue Box
- "Looking at You", a 2007 song by James Marsters off the album Like a Waterfall
- "Looking at You", a 2009 song by IU off the album Growing Up
- "Looking at You", a 2011 song by Bracket off the album Cupid Stories
- "Looking at You", a 2016 song by Ice Prince off the album Jos to the World

== Other uses ==
- Looking at You, a 2016 art exhibition of works by Eran Shakine

== See also ==
- Look at You (disambiguation)
- Here's Looking at You (disambiguation)
- Here's Looking at You Kid (disambiguation)
