= Paris bid for the 2008 Summer Olympics =

Failed bid to host Games of the XXIX Olympiad

Bids for the 2008 Summer Olympics
Overview
- Games of the XXIX Olympiad
- Winner: Beijing; Runner-up: Toronto; Shortlist: Paris · Istanbul · Osaka

Details
- City: Paris, France
- NOC: French Olympic Committee

Previous Games hosted
- 1900 Summer Olympics, 1924 Summer Olympics; Previously bid in 1992

Decision
- Result: Third place

Paris 2008 was an unsuccessful bid for the 2008 Summer Olympics by the city of Paris and the French Olympic Committee. Paris previously hosted the 1900 Summer Olympics and the 1924 Summer Olympics. The bid made it to the final IOC vote, with Osaka being eliminated in the first round, but gained only 18 votes to Istanbul's 9, Toronto's 22 and Beijing's 56.

== Bid process ==
=== Application ===
The French bid was launched by Jacques Chirac, shortly after the successful 1998 FIFA World Cup which was seen as a sign of France's competence in hosting major sporting events. It was reported that up to 80% of the French population supported hosting the Games. The bid also had the support of the City of Paris, the Ile-de-France region, the French government and the French Olympic Committee. The Paris bid was judged to have "one of the most powerful ... public rail transport systems". The bid's proposed extensions and improvements "would fit in particularly well ... to the proposed Games concept."

Table entries in bold denote criteria where the Paris bid was the highest rated of all the candidate cities

Paris 2008 application evaluation
Criterion	**Minimum grade**	**Maximum grade**
Government support and public opinion	6.7	6.7
General infrastructure	**7.6**	**8.5**
Sports infrastructure	7.2	8.5
Olympic Village	7.2	8.7
Environmental impact	7.0	8.0
Accommodation	**10.0**	**10.0**
Transport links	**7.7**	**9.0**
Security	7.0	8.4
Experience	**8.5**	**9.5**
Games Concept	**8.0**	**9.0**

=== Candidacy ===
Paris was accepted as a candidate city in August 2000. In March 2001, the IOC Evaluation Commission travelled to Paris to assess the French bid.

The host of the 2008 Games was chosen at the 112th IOC Session on 13 July 2001 in Moscow. Results from the two rounds of voting were as follows:

2008 Host City Election — ballot results
City	Country (NOC)	**Round 1**	**Round 2**
Beijing	China	**44**	**56**
Toronto	Canada	20	22
Paris	France	15	18
Istanbul	Turkey	17	9
Osaka	Japan	6	—

== Venues ==
According to organisers, more than 60% of the needed venues already existed in Paris.

=== Sporting venues ===
39 competition venues were planned. In Paris, these included: Venues in italics were planned to be built, should the bid be successful.

- Stade de France for athletics and football.
- La Courneuve for shooting.
- Aubervilliers velodrome for track cycling.
- Puiseux-en-France Baseball and Softball centre for baseball and softball.
- Boulevard des Sports for badminton, basketball, handball, gymnastics and swimming.
- Grand Palais for fencing.
- Champs de Mars for beach volleyball.
- Esplanade des Invalides for the pentathlon, dressage and show jumping.
- Bois de Boulogne:
  - Longchamp and Auteuil racecourses for 3-day equestrian events.
  - Longchamp tracks for road cycling.
  - Château de la Muette lawns for triathlon.
  - Château de Bagatelle lawns for archery.
- Parc André Citroën volleyball hall for volleyball.
- Parc de Saint-Cloud for mountain biking.
- Stade Jean-Bouin for hockey.
- Parc des Princes stadium for football.
- Stade Roland Garros for tennis.
- Stade Pierre de Coubertin for volleyball and taekwondo.
- Palais des Sports for weightlifting.
- ParisExpo for boxing and wrestling
- Vaires-sur-Marne basin for rowing and canoeing and kayaking.
- Carpentier Hall for table tennis.
- Paris-Bercy Multisports Complex for judo and volleyball.
- Créteil Olympic pool for water polo.
- Stade Sébastien Charléty for football.
- Stade Pershing for baseball.

=== Olympic Village ===
The planned Olympic Village had a total capacity of 17,300 beds but was criticised in the Candidate City report for having some planning issues.

== Bid legacy ==
After the 2001 IOC vote in Moscow, French President Jacques Chirac said that although he regretted that Paris' bid had failed, he had not given up hope for a future Olympic bid. The chief executive of the Paris 2012 bid, Philippe Baudillon, later said that the 2008 bid was too "technical and French". After bidding for the 2012 Summer Olympics and losing out to London, in 2017 Paris bid for and was awarded the 2024 Summer Olympics.

== See also ==
- France at the Olympics
