= Look at Us (disambiguation) =

Look at Us is an album by Sonny & Cher.

Look at Us may also refer to:

- "Look at Us" (Vince Gill song), from the album Pocket Full of Gold
- "Look at Us" (Craig Morgan song), from the album I Love It
- "Look at Us" (Sarina Paris song), from the album Sarina Paris

== See also ==
- Turn Around, Look at Us, album by the Bee Gees
- "Look at Us Now", song by Lost Kings
- Look at Me (disambiguation)
- Look at You (disambiguation)
