= List of Moose in the City =

The following were moose in the Moose in the City program in Toronto, Ontario in 2000.

== List of moose ==
Title	Artist(s)	Patron	Original location	Original address	Current location	2001 auction price	Fate
360 Moose	Petros Martin	CN Tower TrizecHahn	CN Tower	301 Front Street West			
A Meal Fit For a Moose	Lori-Ann Bellissimo	Telelatino	Coming Soon				
A Most Mysterious Moose Manuscript	Flavio Belli	Original Patron: Senator Jerry & Carole Grafstein; Current Patron: Gabriel Erem and Family of Lifestyle Magazine	Mount Sinai Hospital	600 University Avenue			
A Night and A Day in the City	M. Tooshkenig & Russel Noganosh	Goodman Phillips & Vineberg	Nathan Phillips Square - on the Square	100 Queen Street West			
A Tribute to Chicago	Greg McEvoy, P.A.L.	InterContinental hotel	InterContinental Toronto-Yorkville	220 Bloor Street West			
Active Lifestyle Moose	Teatro Verde	Harry Rosen Inc.	on the Move				
Admiral Antlers	Robin Cornish	Nautical Adventures Inc.	on River Gambler - Pier 27	55 Queen's Quay			
Air Borne	Zelie Burke & Donna Sistilli	Greater Toronto Airports Authority	Lester B. Pearson International Airport	3111 Convair Drive			
Alces Floribunda	Origins Botanical Artists	JJ Muggs Grille & Bar	Toronto Eaton Centre	1 Dundas Street			
Algonquin Moose	Carol Knowlton-Dority	Ontario Ministry of Tourism	Metro Toronto Convention Centre	255 Front Street West			
$All Canadian	Anna Skof	The Peel Pub	King & Duncan	276 King Street West			
Alphabet Moose	Canada Day Participants	Canada Day Celebration	Toronto City Hall, inside	100 Queen Street West			
Ancestral Moose	Katherine Palys	GWL Realty Advisors Inc.	Commerce Court - in the pool	199 Bay Street			
Animal Moosaic	Cardinal Carter Academy of the Arts, Aurora Pagano & Arts Effects 2000	Toronto Zoo	near entrance to Zoo	361 Old Finch Avenue			
Anonomoose	Sue Cohen, William J. Deschamps, Sü Reed, Jacqueline Scott, Ian Symons, Anabela Melo, Penny Bateman, Suzanne Thompson	The 2000–2001 Board of Trade Directors	First Cdn Place - Adelaide Street Entrance closest to the BOT.	100 King Street West			
Aqua Moose	Julia Jagielowicz, Magdalena Sabat, Brenna Donghue, Etobicoke School of the Arts	The Fish House	University & Front St.	144 Front Street West			
Art of the Moose	Roy Bowers	Imperial Oil	St. Clair & Avenue Road	111 St Clair Avenue West			
ASH CITY 2000	yum design	Ash City Worldwide	Commerce Court - poolside	200 Bay Street			
Atlas Moose	Michael O'Brien	ACME Grill	Front & John	86 John Street			
Autumn Moose	Viktoras V. Palys	MFP Financial Services	BCE Place	181 Bay Street			
Autumn Walk	Emily Duke	PenYork Properties Inc.	North York City Centre Mall Atrium	5160 Yonge Street			
B.C.E. (Before Common Era)	Bros. Matejka, BFB	CIBC	Commerce Court	199 Bay Street			
Baby Moose	Charles Pachter	Murray and Marvelle Koffler	Mount Sinai Hospital	600 University Avenue			
Bavaria	Julie Walsh	BMW	Yorkville Park	136 Cumberland Street			
Bay Street Moose (Moose 099)	Michale Payeur	Original Patron: George A. Cohon / Current Patron: Applied Innovations Group	Commerce Court	199 Bay Street			
Bay Street Moose (Moose 286)	Teri Donovan	Yorkdale Shopping Centre	3401 Dufferin Street (Yorkdale Shopping Centre)				
Beer Moose	Nico Monteleone	LCBO	at LCBO head office	55 Lake shore Blvd East			
Big Blue	Deyanne Holmes	IBM	Commerce Court	199 Bay Street			
Biomoositron TV System featuring Canadian Music	Douglas MacRae	Tower Records	Queen & Yonge	2 Queen Street West Tower Records			
Bloomin' Moose	Linda Kristin Blix	Gentra/Brookfield Management Services	King & York	130 King Street West			
Blue Moose	Jocelyn McTavish	Labatt Breweries Ontario	On the Move				
Breezey	Grey Canada	Febreze by Procter & Gamble	Metro Square at King & John	55 John Street			
Bruce the Moose	Aleksandra Zeremski	Canadian International Air Show	On the move find it @ http://www.cias.org				
Buffalo Moose	Luke Schaefer	Ontario Ministry of Tourism	On the move				
Canada's First Ambulance	Lisa Rotenberg & Dale Zimmerman	The Second City	The Second City	56 Blue Jays Way			
Canada's First Fire Truck	Lisa Rotenberg	Toronto Professional Firefighters	Fire Station #1	260 Adelaide Street West			
Canadian "Natural" Anthem	Jay Dampf	TD Bank Financial Group	TD Centre	55 King Street West			
Canadian Whiskey Moose	Nico Monteleone	LCBO		545 Yonge Street at Wellesley			
Catchem' Moose	Custodial Artists Inc.	Warner Bros	207 Queen's Quay West (Queen's Quay Terminal)				
Cedarella/ Flori Bunda	Kay Long & associates	Telus	TD Centre	66 Wellington Street			
Cerridaeic Coalition	John B. Boyle	Church Wellesley Community Business Association, Grenwin Properties, Signature		Maitland & Church south/west side			
Certified Moose Investor	anonymous	TD Waterhouse Investor Services	Bay & Bloor	77 Bloor Street West			
Charmed	McGivern	Zanzibar Tavern Inc	Yonge north of Elm	359 Yonge Street			
Cheque Moose	Joe	MDC Corporation Inc.		45 Hazelton Avenue			
Chicago Moose	Tiffany K. Zufelt	Ontario Ministry of Tourism	Canadian Diplomat - now in Chicago				
Chocolate Moose	David Warne & Cornelius Heesters	Holiday Inn On King	Holiday Inn on King	370 King Street West			
City Moose / Country Moose	Susan Mandel Davidson & Carol Pasternak	Ontario Ministry of Tourism	Ontario Place, inside park	955 Lake shore Blvd West			
Coffee "Mousse"	Louisa Varalta	Lettieri Espresso Bar Café	"currently at Spadina and Queen call 905-856-0089 for updates"				
Col. Harland S. Moose	Joseph Flasko	KFC	Queen & Yonge	2 Queen Street West			
Colliers Moosers & Shakers	Armando Zap	Colliers International	One Queen Street East, lobby	1 Queen Street East			
Community Moose	Wendy Lilly	Scotiabank for United Way of Greater Toronto	Berczy Park - Front St. East & Scott Street	27 Front Street East			
Compass Rose	Arts East	Telus	TD Centre	66 Wellington Street			
Crackled Moose	Andy Pimpinella	Molson Canada	John & Front St.	300 Front Street West			
Crazy Moose	Suzanne Bengough	Toronto Eaton Centre (The Cadillac Fairview Corporation Ltd.)	Eaton Centre - inside concourse	20 Queen Street West			
Creative Colour	AM Gibel	GWL Realty Advisors Inc.	Commerce Court - in the pool	199 Bay Street			
Cujo	Lindsay Davies	Magna International Inc.	Yonge & Front	1 Front Street East	Buttertarts 'n More, Little Britain, Ontario		Cujo still resides beside store as of May 2021.
Cultural Moosaic (Moose 103)	Terrence Jon Dyck	CIBC	Commerce Court - poolside	199 Bay Street			
Cultural Moosaic (Moose 010)	Kirsten Fingerle	Gentra/Brookfield Management Services	Queen's Quay Terminal	207 Queen's Quay West			
Cultural Mosaic Moose	M. Charbonneau & L. Eyman	Bank of Montreal	First Canadian Place	100 King St. West			
CyberMoose	TeenNet Project	Rogers	Bloor & Jarvis	333 Bloor Street East			
Dazzle Moose	Bernie Hillar	Gentra/Brookfield Management Services	BCE Place	181 Bay Street			
Diplomoose	Patricia Seaton Homonylo	Toronto Marriott Eaton Centre	Toronto Marriott Eaton Centre	525 Bay Street			
Diversity Moose	Chinese Work Ethic	Scarborough Town Centre Merchants Association & Promotions Fund	Scarborough Town Centre	300 Borough Drive			
Diversity/Proud/Jardin de Meme	Robert Durocher	York University, Fernhill	York University	4700 Keele Street			
Don Moosé	Andrejs Ritins Sassy Bead Co. & Ritins Studio Inc.	Canadian Opera Women's Committee	Sheraton Centre Toronto Hotel	123 Queen Street West			
Don't Follow Me I'm Lost	Lynn Oreskovic	Toronto Parking Authority	University & Front	1 University Avenue			
Down by the Bay "Did You Ever See a Moose..."	Debra Carroll & Andrea Cowen	The Bay	Bloor & Yonge	2 Bloor Street East			
Dr. Alces alces	Kathleen A. Pyatt	Onex Corporation	Mount Sinai Hospital	600 University Avenue			
Dragon Moose	Peng Ma	Toronto Eaton Centre (Cadillac Fairview Corporation)	Toronto Eaton Centre, Trinity entrance				
Driving Moose Daisy	Kelly Borgers	ATTO & Associates Insurance Brokers Inc., Barton Place Long Term Care Facility	Bathurst & Barton	914 Bathurst Street			
Duncan	Magic Mud Studios	Maple Leaf Sports & Entertainment	Air Canada Centre	40 Bay Street			
Eat, Drink & Be Moosy	Pierre Turner	Ontario Restaurant Hotel & Motel Association	Entertainment District	330 King Street West			
Electributor	Mark Dias	Toronto Hydro Corporation	Front & Church	57 Front St. East			
Endangered Ecosystem	Nancy Newton	GWL Realty Advisors Inc.	Commerce Court - in the pool	199 Bay Street			
Environment Moose	James Wong	TD Bank Financial Group	TD Centre	55 King Street West			
Ex-Calibur	Sabine & Paul Dhir	The Board of Governors for Exhibition Place	National Trade Centre, inside	100 Princess Avenue			
Familiar & Fame Moose #1 (Moose 071)	Patricia Storms	Famous Players	John & Richmond	259 Richmond Street West			
Familiar & Fame Moose #2 (Moose 246)	Patricia Storms	Famous Players	Yonge & Eglinton, inside	2345 Yonge Street			
Film Festival	Charles Weiss	Bell	Roy Thompson Hall - now in the pond	60 Simcoe Street			
Finish Line	Andy Pimpinella	Molson Canada	Front & John, northwest corner				
Florence Moosingale	Kelly Borgers	Integracare Incorporated	Integracare Incorporated, frontlawn	396 Moore Avenue			As of May 2020, still located at 396 Moore Avenue.
Flower Power Snapshot Moose	Leslie Ann Becker	Kodak Canada Inc.		207 Queen's Quay West at York St.			
Formula 1	Amy Kwong	BMW	Yorkville Park	136 Cumberland Street			
Four Seasons	Deyanne Holmes	Enbridge Consumers Gas	Toronto Music Garden	475 Queen's Quay West			
Frosted Chocolate Moose	Zbigniew Blazeje	Bloor Street Diner/Panorama	on Bay St. south of Bloor	55 Bloor St. West			
Gene Moose	Karen Roulstone	Research Institutes of the University Health Network Mount Sinai Hospital	University & Gerrard median	600 University Avenue	10 Regatta Rd		At this location since 2018
Get Your Hooves On The Street	Debra Pugh & associates	Celebrate Toronto Street Festival	On the move				
Glam-moose	Elizabeth Bailey	Tiffany & Co.	Tiffany & Co.	85 Bloor Street West			
Global "MOO"Seaic	Craig Stephen	Baker & McKenzie Barristers and Solicitors	BCE Place	181 Bay Street			
Global Commoosication	Gregory Alan Elliott	Bell	Bay & Albert	483 Bay Street			
Global Moose	Fraser Paterson	Metro Toronto Convention Centre	Metro Toronto Convention Centre	255 Front Street West			
Go Stand by the Moose...And Smile, Honey!	Clarissa M. Lewis	Danforth by the Valley BIA	Ellerbeck & Danforth	200 Danforth Avenue		$6550	
Go-Go Moose	Arts East	GO Transit	Union Station, Concourse level, inside station	140 Bay Street			
Golden Moose	Stephen Aikenhead	Royal Ontario Museum	Royal Ontario Museum, outside	100 Queen's Park			
Gramma's Beauty	Denise Frechette	Mortab Ltd.	Baycrest Centre for Geriatric Care	3560 Bathurst Street			
GT Moose Connect	Byron Miecznikowski	Group Telecom	Bay/Queen's Quay—statue	20 Bay Street			
Guess Who?	Kristel Tempest McKay & Samantha Smith	Taurus Capital Markets Ltd.	Commerce Court	199 Bay Street			
Guest Book	CN Tower guests	CN Tower TrizecHahn	CN Tower, Inside	301 Front Street West			
H.R.M. His Royal Moose	Joan Holben	Royal York Hotel		100 Front Street (near valet)			
Heads or Tails?	Marion Bond	Forex Group International Corporate Foreign Exchange Services	Commerce Court, poolside	199 Bay Street			
Heavenly Moose	Donna Sistilli & Zelie Burke	Galileo Equity Management Inc.	Bay & Wellington	161 Bay Street			
Henry, The Blue Moose	Charles Taylor	Ford of Canada	Air Canada Centre main doors	40 Bay Street			
Here's Looking at You	Fiona Smyth	Bravado Boutique, Compleat Kitchen, Gallery Gevik, Feheley Fine Arts, Budd Sugerman Interiors, Seniority Investments		18 Hazelton Avenue			
Hidey	Roger Scannura	Roots Canada Ltd.	Bloor & St. Thomas Street	95 Bloor Street West			
Hockey Moose (Moose 031)	Matthew Hansen	Original Patron: George M. Mencke and Family / Current Patron: Pacific Trading	Front & Yonge	1 Front Street East			
Hockey Moose (Moose 206)	Havergal College, Grade 10 Art Class	The Nike Store Toronto	Bloor & Thomas Street	110 Bloor Street West			
Hockey Sweater Moose	Susan L. Brown & Temma Gentles	Molson Canada	Old Spaghetti Factory	54 The Esplanade			
Home Away From Home	Lydia VanPelt & children of Ronald McDonald House	McDonald's Restaurants of Canada	Gerrard east of Yonge	26 Gerrard Street East			
Homer	Barbara Mollett	Greater Toronto Home Builders' Association	York Mills & Don Mills	20 Upjohn Road			
Honest Ed's Moose	Studio 1181	Ed & David Mirvish	581 Bloor Street West (Bloor & Markham Street)				
Hudson Bay Moose	Tim Zimmerman	The Bay	Queen & Bay	176 Yonge Street			
"Il Migliore Moose" ASH CITY MOOSE	Alan Chau	Ash City Worldwide	Yorkville Park	136 Cumberland Street			
Imagine	Scott McGovern & Nick DenBoer	Ontario Lottery & Gaming Corporation		33 Bloor Street East (inside building)			
In Celebration of Spirit	Beth Cotton	George A. Cohon	Variety Village	3701 Danforth Avenue			
Inception of Multi-Culturalism	Owen Leo Johnson	Kennedy Rd. BIA	Kennedy & Lawrence	2370 Lawrence Ave. East			
Integration Moose	Ian Leventhal & Small Business & Personal Lending	TD Canada Trust	TD Centre	55 King Street West			
Is That Your Final Antler?	Designed by: Michelle Lydon; Constructed by: Kurosh Amirkhani	CTV Inc.	Masonic Temple	888 Yonge Street at Davenport			
Island Ferry	Charles Weiss	Loblaw Companies Limited	Bathurst & St. Clair	396 St. Clair Avenue West		$6552	
Jay Moose	Duncan Brown	Labatt Breweries Ontario	SkyDome	1 Blue Jays Way			
Jingle Moose	The Fabricland Art Studio	Fabricland Distributors Inc.	Yorkdale Shopping Centre	3401 Dufferin Street			
Junior	Beth Cotton	Manulife Centre	Bloor & Bay	55 Bloor Street West			
Labatt Ice Glow Moose	Gerda Neubacher	Labatt Breweries Ontario	Church & Wellesley	519 Church Street			
Leather Moose	Charles Pachter	Inniskillin Wines	Church & Wellesley east	77 Wellesley Street East			
Legal Moose	Michale Payeur	Greenspan, Henein and White Barristers	St. James Park - King & Jarvis	144 King Street East			
Lemon Moose	Steve Rose	Past Presidents, the Toronto Board of Trade: D. Brown, J.Clarry, J.D. Crashley	First Canadian Place (outside Board of Trade)				
Lion King Moose	Margaret Glew	The Lion King	300 King Street West (Princess of Wales Theatre)				
Loose Moose	Lorie Hollingworth	Zinc Construction	Dupont at Davenport	113 Dupont Street			
Lost Moose	Beth Cotton	BMW	BMW Canada Head Office	920 Champlain Court			
Loyalist Moose	Peter Johnson	Simcoe Place	Simcoe Place	136 Simcoe Street	Sherbourne Street		
Lucky	Lynn Oreskovic & Liz Raybould	Ontario Lottery and Gaming Corporation	Yonge & York Mills	4120 Yonge Street			
Mac Moose	yum design	Macgregor Meat & Seafood Limited	St. Lawrence Market	92 Front Street East			
Magnificent Moose	mielczarek	Molson Canada	Scarborough Civic Centre	150 Borough Drive			
Majestic Moose (Moose 008)	mielczarek	Molson Canada	on the move - HMCS Toronto - at sea				
Majestic Moose (Moose 060)	Don Valley Art Club	Holiday Inn On King	Holiday Inn on King - Inside	370 King Street West			
Mamacita Moose	Patti Waterfield & M.M. Mahan	Mamacita Inc.	Nathan Phillips Square - on the square	100 Queen Street West			
Mamma Mia Moose	Richard Payne - Presentation Arts Studio	Mamma Mia!	Royal Alexandra Theatre	260 King Street West			
Map O' Moose	Andy Pimpinella	Molson Canada	John & Front St.	300 Front Street West			
Maple Moose	Peng Ma	Holiday Inn On King	Holiday Inn on King	370 King Street West			
Marilyn Moose	Charles Pachter	The Tory Family	Old City Hall	60 Queen Street West			
Market Moose	Elizabeth Kennedy	Loblaw Companies Limited	Empress Walk	5095 Yonge Street			
Marquee de Moose	Alan Glicksman & Suzanne Myers	Cineplex Odeon Cinemas	Yonge south of St. Clair	1303 Yonge Street			
Meeting Place	C Freeman, P. Wood, CCC Art	CIBC	Commerce Court, poolside	199 Bay Street			
Mega Moose (Moose 047)	mielczarek	Molson Canada	Front & John	86 John Street			
Mega Moose (Moose 131)	Dubi Arie	Sheraton Centre Toronto Hotel	Sheraton Centre Toronto Hotel	123 Queen Street West			
Mel Moose	Charles Pachter	Original Patron: Dr. and Mrs. Walter Unger; Current Patron: Mediacom	Old City Hall	60 Queen Street West			
Mel the Moose	Matthew Hansen	BMW Canada	Yorkville Park	136 Cumberland Street			
Merry Mary Quite Monetary	Angela Doran	BMO Nesbitt Burns		100 Queen Street West			
Metal Moose	Gary Capon	Visioneering Corp.	Nathan Phillips Square - on the square	100 Queen Street West			
Metropolis Moose	Justine E. Dart	RE/MAX REALTRON REALTY INC.		183 Willowdale Avenue (in front of building)			
Micro Moose	Gerry Lantaigne - Century Signs	Coretec Inc.	Sheppard & Morningside Dr.	8150 Sheppard Avenue East			
Million Dollar Moose	M. Brown & Thorncliffe Park P.S. Students	Royal Bank Financial Group	Royal Bank Plaza	176 Bay Street			
Ming Moose	Kai Chan	Zurich Canada	University south of Dundas	400 University Avenue			
Mirvish Village Moose	Studio 1181	Ed & David Mirvish	Mirvish Village	581 Bloor Street West			
Mister Theodore Dunkin (TD) Water Moose	Children from Harbourfront Centre School by the Water	TD Bank Financial Group	TD Centre Bay & King	55 King Street West			
Monarch Moose	Fraser Paterson	Delta Chelsea	Delta Chelsea Hotel - Yonge & Walton	380 Yonge Street			
Montgomery	Julia Jagielowicz, Magdalena Sabat, Brenna Donghue, Etobicoke School of the Arts	Etobicoke Hospital Foundation, Etobicoke Hospital Campus, William Osler Health Centre	Etobicoke General Hospital	101 Humber College Blvd.			
Moollennium Moose	Tiffany K. Zufelt	Wilson Logistics Inc.	On the move, Canadian Diplomat - now in Sydney, Australia				
Moose 'n Boots	Heather Collins & the children from Church Street	Toronto Public Library	T.O. Public Library - Bloor & Yonge	789 Yonge Street			
Moose About Town	Margaret Glew	Standard Securities Capital Corporation	Hazelton at Scollard	24 Hazelton Avenue			
Moose City Landmarks	Walter Ruston	Toronto Colony Hotel	Toronto Colony Hotel	89 Chestnut Street			
Moose du Soleil	Kimberly Ann Collins	Telus	TD Centre Bay & Wellington	66 Wellington Street			
Moose En Scene	Philip Hare	Alliance Atlantis Communications Inc.	Bloor & Church	121 Bloor Street East			
Moose Flambe	Peter Marsh	Toronto Dominion Centre Cadillac Fairview Corporation Limited	TD Centre - PATH underground	66 Wellington Street			
Moose in Camouflage	Alice Burton	Simon Yakubowicz	Jaguar Dealership Coventry Lane Jaguar, inside	1910 Eglinton Avenue East			
Moose in Vive Village	Diane D. Labatt	The Wexford Restaurant	Lawrence & Warden	2072 Lawrence Avenue East			
Moose Map	Richard Wyman	Mercedes-Benz Canada	Dundas & River	761 Dundas Street East			
Moose Media	Kimberly Ann Collins	Oasis Technology	Sheppard - east of Yonge	100 Sheppard Avenue East			
Moose Mosaica	Ian Leventhal	Ernst & Young	Ernst & Young Tower	222 Bay Street			
Moose Motif	Ed Bruner	Royal Bank Financial Group	Royal Bank Plaza	176 Bay Street			
Moose of Quotes	Lupe Rodriguez	McClelland & Stewart	University north of Dundas	481 University Avenue			
Moose of the Four Elements Earth, Air, Fire, Water	Emily Mandy	North York Chamber of Commerce	Mel Lastman Square	5100 Yonge Street			
Moose on the Loose	Andrea Cowen & Debra Carroll	Yorkdale Shopping Centre	Yorkdale Shopping Centre	3401 Dufferin Street			
Moose on the Move	Carl Durban	Toronto Blue Jays	SkyDome	1 Blue Jays Way			
Moose on the Run	ROM SMC painted by children with artist Frances Key	TD Bank Financial Group	TD Centre	55 King Street West			
Moose on Vacation	The Fabricland Art Studio	Fabricland Distributors Inc.	Yorkdale Shopping Centre	3401 Dufferin Street			
Moose Over Miami	Ian Leventhal	Original Patron: Baycrest Centre for Geriatric Care	Current Patron: Donna & Jopseph Gottdenker	Baycrest Centre for Geriatric Care	3560 Bathurst Street		
Moose Stop	Mimi Chan	Mediacom	Bloor & Church	120 Bloor Street East			
Moose Transit Commission	Studio 1181	Toronto Transit Commission	TTC Subway Stations	On the move			
Moose Trap	ryanbarrett	anonymous	Nathan Phillips Square	100 Queen Street West			
Moose Under Construction	Carol Knowlton-Dority	Revy Home Centres Inc.	Warden & Comstock	768 Warden Avenue			
Moose World	Ann Burke	Berlitz Canada Inc.		94 Cumberland Street (in front of building)			
Moose-aic in the City	Karen Ahmed	Toronto.com	Peter north of King	80 Peter Street			
Moose-in-Boots	Dagma	Bata Shoe Museum	Bata Shoe Museum	327 Bloor Street West			
Moose-Jaws	Bernie Hillar	Rexdale Redi-Mix	Nathan Phillips Square, in the pool	100 Queen Street West			
Moose-koka	Michelle Threndyle & Harreson Cebiliak	Toronto Eaton Centre (Cadillac Fairview Corporation)	Toronto Eaton Centre	20 Queen Street West			
Moose-Shall McLuhan	Gregory Alan Elliott	Marshall McLuhan (1911–1980) Professor, University of Toronto	Queen's Park Cr. West, north of College - University of Toronto	7 Hart House Circle			
Moose-Stang	Matthew Hansen	Gentra/Brookfield Management Services Ltd.	BCE Place	181 Bay Street			
Moosekenzie	Wilfred T. McLean	Mackenzie Financial Corporation	Bloor east of Avenue Road	150 Bloor Street West			
Mooseline Tours	Michele Nidenoff	CIBC	Commerce Court - poolside	199 Bay Street			
Moosemart	Fritz Branschat - Intrikat	Walmart Canada	University & Richmond on median	200 University Avenue			
Moosepaper	Margaret Glew	Toronto Sun	Yorkville Park	136 Cumberland Street			
Moosetro	Lynn Raitt	Toronto Symphony Volunteer Committee	Roy Thompson Hall - in the pond	60 Simcoe Street			
Moosician	Mary Craig Gardner	du Maurier	Nathan Phillips Square - on the square	100 Queen Street West			
Moosie	Spin Master Toys with Children from Sick Kids Hospital	Spin Master Toys	Esplanade east of Jarvis	250 The Esplanade			
Moosieure e.customs	Brian Domander	MSR	Metro Toronto Convention Centre	255 Front Street West			
Mooski (Moose 302)	Marjie Rawski	Christie Gardens Apartments & Care	Forest Hill Village	600 Melita Crescent			
Mooski (Moose 303)	Michele Van Maurik & Nicole Shaw	Marsha & Edward Bronfman	Forest Hill Village - Lonsdale west of Spadina	345 Lonsdale Rd.			
Mosaic Moose	Lori Le Mare Ritins	Neill-Wycik College Co-operative College	Gerrard west of Jarvis	96 Gerrard Street East			
Mountain Moose	Carol Matson, Jennifer Sutton, Tanya Howells Janine Lindgren	Art Gallery of Ontario	Art Gallery of Ontario	317 Dundas Street West			
Mountie Moose	Kris Morrison of Urban Illustrations	CN Tower TrizecHahn	During the Moose in the City street exhibit this Moose resided at: 301 Front Street West (CN Tower)				
Mr. Herby Cloud	Sarka Buchl Stephenson	Lindt & Sprungli (Canada) Inc.	University & Elm	525 University Avenue			
Ms. Fashion Moose	Various Artists	Yorkdale Shopping Centre	Yorkdale Shopping Centre - new outfit monthly	3401 Dufferin Street			
Multi-Moose	Lorna Livey	Gluskin, Sheff + Associates	BCE Place	181 Bay Street			
Multicultural Millennium Moose	Christine Homonylo	Toronto Eaton Centre (The Cadillac Fairview Corporation Ltd.)	Eaton Centre, Dundas entrance	20 Queen Street West			
Muse d'ARTFAX	Students of Artfax, TDSB	Enbridge Consumers Gas	Old City Hall	60 Queen Street West			
My best pal, George	Patricia Storms	Ken McGowen	McDonald's Restaurants of Canada head office	2 McDonald's Place			
N.O. Smokey	Mural Xpress - Davenport-Perth Neighbourhood Centre	Not to Kids Committee, Ministry of Health & Long Term Care	Metro Square	55 John Street			
No Staples Please!	Roger Hill	Vickers & Benson	Yonge & Davisville	1920 Yonge Street			
NORTH END Moose	yum design	Ash City Worldwide	Royal Bank Plaza	176 Bay Street			
Northern Joker	Julie Walsh	Kennedy Rd. BIA	Kennedy Road & 401	20 William Kitchen Rd.			
Northern Lights	Gerry Sevier, AOCAD OSA RCA	Ontario Ministry of Tourism	Ontario Place	955 Lake shore Blvd. West			
Northern Lights Moose	Debra Wyles	CH2M Gore & Storrie Ltd.	Budapest Park - at bottom of Parkside Drive	1491 Lake shore Blvd. West			
O Canada Moose	Cynthia Lorenz	Scotiabank	Empress Walk	5075 Yonge Street			
Oh' Canada	Vessna Perunovich & Vanja Vasic	Goodman and Carr	On the move	Canadian Diplomat - now in Sydney, Australia			
Olympic Moose	Charles Pachter	Toronto 2008 Olympic Bid	Nathan Phillips Square - Look up!	100 Queen Street West			
Ornamoosement	Cardinal Carter Academy of the Arts, Aurora Pagano and Arts Effects 2000	Save the Children Canada	Ontario Science Centre	770 Don Mills Road			
Pal	A_Net & Spectrum Art Group from B.C.A.L.C.	Scotiabank	Scotia Plaza	40 King Street West			
Palais Moose-ic Got Rhythm	Alberto Velasco	Gem Consulting and Friends of the Palais	Lake shore, east of Parkside Dr.	1601 Lake shore Blvd West			
Paper Mooshé	Sherman Laws Communications Inc.	Grand & Toy	Don Mills & Eglinton	33 Green Belt Drive			
Park a Moose	Kelly Borgers	Monarch Construction	Eglinton at Leslie	1100 Eglinton Avenue East			Monarch's moose was in front of the sales office for The Carrington on the Park condominium, at Eglinton and Leslie. It was painted with "park like motifs."
Patient Moose	Michael Dixon	John, Amanda & Alex Sherrington	Sunnybrook Hospital	2075 Bayview Avenue			
Pet-A-Moose	Lydia Van Pelt Central Montessori Schools	Telus	TD Centre Bay & Wellington	66 Wellington Street			
Pharmoosist	Lisa Rotenberg	Shoppers Drug Mart	Yonge & Eglinton	2345 Yonge Street			
Phony Moose	Heather Graham	FIDO, Microcell Solutions	Yonge & Eglinton	2279 Yonge Street			
Pizza Moose	Pierre Turner	Pizza Hut	On the move	Canadian Diplomat - now in Sydney, Australia			
Pokemoose	Custodial Artists Inc.	Warner Bros	Queen's Quay Terminal	207 Queen's Quay West			
Police Moose	Kris Morrison of Urban Illustrations	Toronto Police Services	Police Headquarters	40 College Street			
POPZ the Moose	Alan Glicksman and Suzanne Myers	Soller Ltd.		192a Bloor Street West			
Portrait of an Artist as a Young Muuse	Vivian Reiss	Four Seasons Hotel Toronto	Four Seasons Hotel	21 Avenue Road		$3383.33	
Presston Starwinkle	Dale Zimmerman & Lisa Rotenberg	The Toronto Star	Yonge & Queen's Quay	1 Yonge Street			Presston Starwinkle was unveiled in a 30-minute ceremony attended by 300. It was placed facing northwest, in the direction "of its living cousins." Its red bowtie honoured Star publisher John Honderich. Star employees submitted 500 naming ideas, and the final name was the combination of two submissions; one of the two winners came down the side of One Yonge Street on window washers' scaffolding, wearing a Rocky the Squirrel costume.
Princess Moosealina	Melleny Melody & the Ninja Boogie Crew	ROYAL DE VERSAILLES, BVLGARI	Bloor at St. Thomas Street	101 Bloor Street West			
Private Moostashi	Peter Alan Jones	Pinedale Properties	Lawrence west of Dufferin	970 Lawrence Avenue Wes€t			
Prosperity Moose	Peng Ma	Bernie Gold, NIC ENTERPRISES	Chinatown	393 Dundas Street West			
Radio Moose	Edith Kernerman	CFRB AM 1010, MIX 99.9	Yonge & St. Clair	2 St. Clair Avenue West			
Rocky	Eva Nicholls	Magna International Inc.	BCE Place	181 Bay Street			
Santa Moose	Temmi Ungerman Sears	All Canada Sports Promotions (Irving Ungerman)	Hospital for Sick Children, on median across from	555 University Avenue			
Scottish Moose	Kris Morrison of Urban Illustrations	Scotiabank	Scotia Plaza	40 King Street West			
Silver Bullet	J. A. Kolinski	The Yonge Street Business & Resident Association	Yonge & Elm	359 Yonge Street		$4100	
Silver Screen Moose	Michale Payeur	Norman Jewison	Canadian Film Centre	2489 Bayview Avenue			
Sir John A. MacMoose -- The Retirement Years	John Ens	Manulife Financial	Bloor & Jarvis	200 Bloor Street East			
SkyMoose	David Lloyd McEachern & Francine Lapointe	SkyDome	SkyDome	1 Blue Jays Way			
Smartrider	Louisa Varalta	Smart Water Canada, Yamaha Motor Canada Ltd.	Four Seasons Hotel, Yorkville Entrance	21 Avenue Rd.			
Smilin' Jack Malton	Brian Domander	Greater Toronto Airports Authority	Lester B. Pearson International Airport	3111 Convair Drive			
Snapple Moose	Turbulence Communications	The Perrier Group of Canada Ltd.	University & Queen - on median	250 University Avenue			
Sparky	Michele Van Maurik	Toronto Fire Services	Near SkyDome; During Fire Prevention Week (October 8 to 12) Sparky will be located at Sheridan Mall (indoors) Erin Mills Parkway and QEW in Mississauga.		Gravenhurst, Ontario Fire College		
Spirit Moose	Nico Monteleone	LCBO	LCBO Store	337 Spadina Avenue			
Spirit of 2000	Greg McEvoy / P.A.L.	Bell	Adelaide & Albert	76 Adelaide Street West			
Stand By Moose	M. Eustace, B. Halstead, D. Taylor Hannah, B. Herman, V. Madar, P. Forde, M. Hunter-Hoffman, S. Ruttonsha	anonymous	North York General Hospital	4001 Leslie Street			
Stanley	Magic Mud Studios	Maple Leaf Sports & Entertainment Ltd.	Air Canada Centre Galleria area	40 Bay Street			
Strawberry Moose with Whipped cream	Teri Donovan & Valery Ibbett	Bloor Yorkville Business Improvement Area	The Village of Yorkville Park	136 Cumberland Street			
Suburban Landscape	Glenn Novak	Hudson Family Foundation	"On the move"				
Suits	Fritz Branschat - Intrikat	Ontario Lottery and Gaming Corporation	Yonge & York Mills	4120 Yonge Street			
Sun Moose	M.M. Mahan & Patti Waterfield	Taco Bell	Richmond & Yonge	1 Richmond Street West			
Sunday in the Beach With Georges	Clarissa M. Lewis	Ron Cohen	Kew Gardens - The Beach	2171 Queen Street East			
Sunflower Moose	Richard Preston	Sunlife Financial	King east of John Street	225 King St West			
Sunsplash	Melisa Fauceglia	Ontario Ministry of Tourism	Nathan Phillips Square - on the square	100 Queen Street West			
Swiss Moose	James Michael Sokoluk	Rolex Watch Company of Canada Limited	Yorkville Park	136 Cumberland Street			
Sydney Moose	Manny Neubacher	Labatt Breweries Ontario	Sydney, Australia				
Take a Ride on the Wild Side	Pey Lu & Melinda Mayhalle	City Buick Pontiac Cadillac Ltd.		1900 Victoria Park Avenue			
Taste the Danforth	Dianne Secord Shackel	Ontario Ministry of Tourism	Logan & Danforth	480 Danforth Avenue			
Teddy Bear Pair (Moose 173)	Wayne Mondok	Fibreglass Fabricators Inc., Spray-On Plastics Ltd., Advanced Wildlife Design Ltd.	Hospital for Sick Children	555 University Avenue			
Teddy Bear Pair (Moose 174)	Wayne Mondok	Fibreglass Fabricators Inc., Spray-On Plastics Ltd., Advanced Wildlife Design Ltd.	Hospital for Sick Children	555 University Avenue			
TedMoose.com	Jason Gringler	@Home.com	Bloor & Jarvis	333 Bloor Street East			
Ten Loose Moose	Agata Ostrowska	Hudson's Bay Centre Promotion Fund	Yonge & Bloor - northeast corner	2 Bloor Street East			
The Adventures of Rocky and Bullwinkle	Vessna Perunovich & Vanja Vasic	Universal Studios Canada	Bay & Bloor	55 Bloor Street West			
The Beer Moose	Luke Schaefer	Molson Canada - Toronto's Own Amber Lager	Lawrence & Victoria Park	1448 Lawrence Avenue East			
The Bride	Lorie Hollingworth	Manulife Centre	Bloor at Bay	55 Bloor Street West, with her groom			
The Brother Moose	RUNT	Jeff Lyons and Terry Tsianos	King & Bathurst - Outside Wheat Sheaf Tavern	667 King Street West			
The Bull Moose	Nancy Drews	National Bank Financial	King & York	130 King Street West			
The Call of the Wild	Robert Sprachman	Bell	Bay and Albert	483 Bay Street			
The Carousel Goose Moose	Al Cockhrane	Centreville Amusement Park	Centre Island - near entrance to Centreville	9 Queen's Quay West			
The Conventioneer Moose	Amy Kwong	Congress Canada	Metro Toronto Convention Centre | 255 Front Street West				
The Crossword Moose	Greg McEvoy / P.A.L.	Better Buildings Partnership	Nathan Phillips Square - on the square	100 Queen Street West			
The Decadent Chocolate Chip Moose	L.B.E. Team	Loblaw Companies Limited	Empress Walk	5095 Yonge St.			
The Four Seasons	Octogone	seven continents	Lawrence & Dufferin	36 Dufflaw Ave			
The Golden Moose	Far Hills Studio	Woodbine Place	Hwy 27 & Rexdale - in lobby	135 Queen's Plate Drive			
The Great Canadian Moosaic	Mosaicwares	Jane Eyton	Toronto General Hospital - Norman Urquhart Wing	585 University Avenue			
The Groom	Lorie Hollingworth	William Ashley China	Bloor at Bay	55 Bloor Street West, with his bride			
The Happyfoot Moose	Alan Chau	McGregor Socks	Wellington & Spadina	401 Wellington Street West			
The Hotmail Moose	Sarka Buchl Stephenson	MSN.CA	Metro Toronto Convention Centre	255 Front Street West			
The King	Valerie Kent	Toronto Grace Hospital	Bloor & Church - Toronto Grace Hospital	650 Church Street			
The Last Moose in Toronto	Nicole Shaw	Centre Island	Toronto Island Ferry Terminal	9 Queen's Quay West			
The Mail Moose	Karen Kraven & Alana Machnicki	EPOST	University south of Dundas	393 University Avenue			
The Millennium Mooseketeer	Andrew Liem, Pop-Art Creative	The Walt Disney Company (Canada) Ltee.	Hospital for Sick Children - facing University Ave.	555 University Avenue			
The Moose Channel	Robin Leatherbarrow & Gary Pearson	Astral Media	BCE Place - inside	181 Bay Street			
The Moose-ician Within	Alberto Velasco	Bay Bloor Radio Inc.	by the steps to Bay Bloor Radio	55 Bloor Street West			
The "Moose"inator	Richard Barczykowski & Jack Krasowski	The Sign of the Skier	Yonge south of Lawrence	2794 Yonge Street			
The Moosiest Moose	Eva Nicholls	Henning and Traute Straite	Harbour Square Park	33 Queen's Quay West			
The Patchwork Icon Moose	Fiona Smyth	Loblaw Companies Limited	Empress Walk	5095 Yonge St.			
The Purple Moose	Nicole Shaw	Bin Shoppin' - Dimitra & Michael Davidson		392 Spadina Road			
The Real Moose	Kelly Rogers	The Honourable Henry N. R. Jackman		165 University Ave.			
The Sherritt Moose	Cynthia Lorenz	Sherritt	Yonge & Shaftesbury	1133 Yonge Street			
The Spirit & The Moose	Dania Madera-Lerman	Royal Bank Financial Group	Royal Bank Plaza	176 Bay Street	77 Samor Rd		
The St. Clement's Moose	Gail Balfe	Torys St. Clement's Parents	Parkette at Yonge & St. Clements	2530 Yonge Street			
The Tourist Moose	Dominick Bradshaw and Robin Leatherbarrow (Designed by Barbara Farquharson)	Royal Canadian Air Farce	CBC building Front & John St	250 Front Street West	1405 Dennison Street, Markham, Ontario		Moved, appears to be owned by Future Steel Buildings.
There's No Place Like Home	Dianne Richardson	GWL Realty Advisors Inc.	Commerce Court – poolside	199 Bay Street			
Time Moose Scape	Shawn Galea	Ontario Science Centre	Ontario Science Centre	770 Don Mills Road	Ontario Science Centre, 770 Don Mills Road		Transformed into Rudolph, and as of 2007, behind the Ontario Science Centre building, near the trash.
Toronto Flying Into the New Millennium	George K. Caltsoudas	Bombardier Aerospace	Dufferin & Wilson	123 Garrett Boulevard			
Toronto History Moose	Amanda Glasbeek	Toronto Stock Exchange	First Canadian Place	Now at 100 King Street West			
Toronto Kids Moose	Toronto Kids	Toronto Kids' Tuesdays	Nathan Phillips Square - on the square	100 Queen Street West			
Toronto's Moose-ic@ work	Jann Arden	EZRock 97.3 FM & their listeners	Yonge & Eglinton	2300 Yonge Street			
Tribal Spirit	Jennie "Tumbling Cat" Wheeler	Royal Bank Financial Group	Royal Bank Plaza	176 Bay Street			
Trillium Moose	Hunter, Lois & Jupiter	Ontario Ministry of Tourism	On the move Canadian Diplomat - now in Sydney, Australia				
Trophy	Jaxon McDade	Niagara Helicopters Ltd.	Holiday Inn on King	370 King Street West			
True North	Gerry Lantaigne - Century Signs	Coca-Cola Ltd.	Nathan Phillips Square - on the square	100 Queen Street West			
True North Strong & Free	Jay Dampf	Greater Toronto Airports Authority	Lester B. Pearson International Airport	3111 Convair Drive			
Untitled (Moose 288)	Janet Morton	Yorkdale Shopping Centre	Yorkdale Shopping Centre - new outfit monthly	3401 Dufferin Street			
Untitled (Moose 291)	anonymous	anonymous	"Coming Soon"				
Urban Camouflage	Jaxon McDade	anonymous	University & Wellington	70 University Avenue			
Urban Reflection	David Lloyd McEachern	Royal Bank Plaza, Oxford Properties	Royal Bank Plaza	176 Bay Street			
Water Moose	Bev Rodin Studios	Warner Bros	Queen's Quay Terminal	207 Queen's Quay West	Marshall McLuhan Catholic Secondary School - 1107 Avenue Road		
Welcome	James Wong	Skyservice	Lester B. Pearson International Airport	5501 Electra Road			
Welcome Moose	Michele Nidenoff	CN Tower TrizecHahn	CN Tower	301 Front Street West			
Welcome to Toronto	James Michael Sokoluk	The Greater Toronto Hotel Association	Metro Toronto Convention Centre	255 Front Street West			
What is a Moose who has no landscape?	Wendy Trusler	Global Television Network	Toronto City Hall, in front of				
What's Bugging You?	Nancy Ciccone	Hilton Toronto	Hilton Toronto	145 Richmond Street West			
Where, Oh Where has the Wilderness Gone?	Jane Lowbeer	Harvey Kalles Real Estate Ltd.	Avenue & Wilson	2145 Avenue Road			
Wild & Wireless	Andrea Stewart	724 Solutions Inc.	Yonge & York Mills	10 York Mills			
Wine Moose	Nico Monteleone	LCBO	at Cooper Street	95 Queen's Quay East			
Wolfgang Amadeus Moozart	Valerie Kent	Sotheby's	Roy Thompson Hall, in the pond	60 Simcoe Street	Shade-o-matic, Vaughan, Ontario		Can be seen from Hwy 400. As of May 2015 building is for Lease, and as a result, the moose may be moved.
Words and Colours	Lawrence Park C.I. student artists & writers	The Merchants of Roy's Square	Yonge & Bloor	18 Roy's Square		$5150	
World Famous Moose	Kathleen Finley, Susan M. Davidson, Carol Pasternak	Ed Garber, co-founder of McDonald's Eastern Canada	McDonald's Restaurants of Canada head office	2 McDonald's Place	(unmoved)	—	As of 2010, still at the McDonald's Canada head office.
World Moose	Dina Torrans	Quebecor World	University & Dundas on median	505 University Avenue			
World Trotter	Aleksandra Zeremski	Greater Toronto Airports Authority	Lester B. Pearson International Airport	3111 Convair Drive			
Youth on a Moose	Patricio Ulloa student of Bendale B.T.I.	Scotia Plaza	Bay Scotia Plaza	40 King Street West			
Yume	Grace Tanouye	Toronto 2008 Olympic Bid	Union Station - Front St & Bay St.	65 Front Street West			
Zapa Moose	Bev Rodin Studios	Warner Bros	Queen's Quay Terminal	207 Queen's Quay West			

== Moose on the Move ==
- Majestic Moose
- Blue Moose
- Moose Transit Commission
- Coffee "Mousse"
- Bruce the Moose
- Get Your Hooves on the Street

== Canadian Diplomats ==
- Buffalo Moose
- Chicago Moose
- Moollennium Moose
- Oh' Canada
- Pizza Moose0
- Sydney Moose
- Trillium Moose
