= Yumemai Bridge =

Yumemai Bridge 夢舞大橋
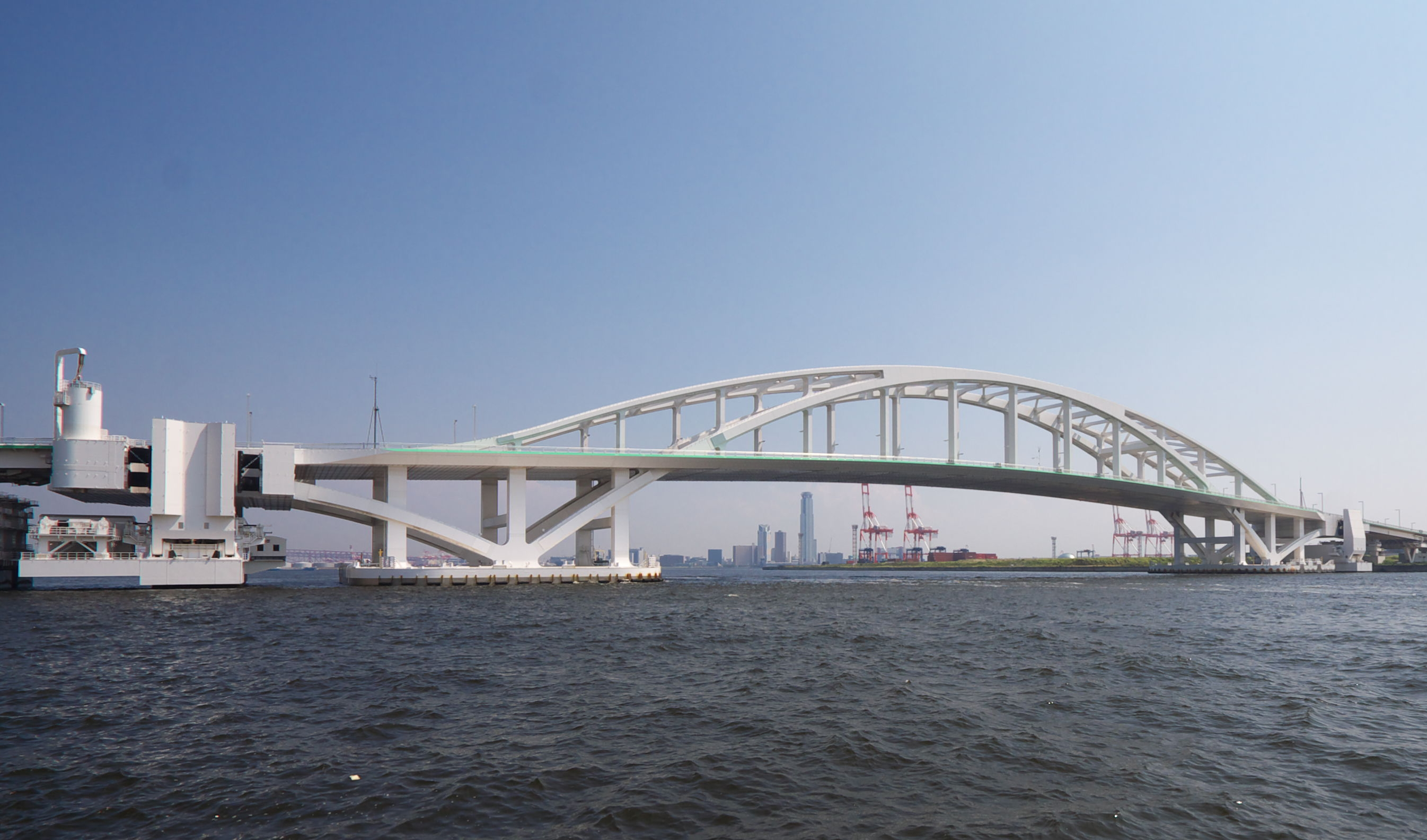
- Yumemai Bridge, Osaka
- Coordinates: 34°39′31.8″N 135°23′58.5″E
- Carries: Motor vehicles
- Crosses: Port of Osaka
- Locale: Konohana, Osaka, Japan
- Named for: Yumeshima and Maishima (islands)

Characteristics
- Total length: 876m
- Width: 33.8m
- Longest span: 280m

History
- Constructed by: IHI, MHI, KHI
- Construction start: 1999
- Construction end: 2001
- Construction cost: ¥63,500,000,000 (~$530,000,000)
- Opened: 1 August 2009

Location
- Interactive map of Yumemai Bridge

The Yumemai Bridge (夢舞大橋, yumemai ōhashi) is a floating moveable bridge in Konohana District, Osaka, Japan. It spans the North Waterway connecting the man-made islands Yumeshima and Maishima of Osaka Port.

It comprises a floating bridge over the waterway, transitional girder bridges on both ends of the floating bridge, and approach bridges on Yumeshima and Maishima. The bridge is supported on two large steel pontoons. Ordinarily, the bridge allows a navigation passage width of 135m. In the event that the main waterway is out of service, the bridge is swung by tugboats to widen the passage width to 200m or more, enabling the passage of larger vessels.

== See also ==
- List of longest arch bridge spans
- Moveable bridge
