= Bids for the 2008 Summer Olympics =

Bids for the 2008 Summer Olympics and Paralympics
Overview
- Games of the XXIX Olympiad; XIII Paralympic Games
- Winner: Beijing; Runner-up: Toronto; Shortlist: Paris · Istanbul · Osaka

Details
- Committee: IOC
- Election venue: Moscow; 112th IOC Session

Map of the bidding cities

Important dates
- First Bid: February 1, 2000
- Second bid: June 20, 2000
- Shortlist: August 28, 2000
- Decision: July 13, 2001

Decision
- Winner: Beijing (56 votes)
- Runner-up: Toronto (22 votes)

Ten cities submitted bids to host the 2008 Summer Olympics and Paralympics that were recognized by the International Olympic Committee (IOC), five of which made the IOC Executive Committee's shortlist. The games were awarded to Beijing, China on July 13, 2001. The other shortlisted cities were Toronto, Paris, Istanbul and Osaka. Beijing won an absolute majority of votes after two rounds of voting, eliminating the need for subsequent rounds of voting. IOC delegates and the media identified a number of factors in its favor, including the size of the country, improvements in Chinese anti-doping enforcement, and its close loss to Sydney, Australia eight years earlier. In that bidding process, which chose the host city for the 2000 Summer Olympics, Beijing led every round of voting but lost in the final round to Sydney by two votes.

A number of politicians and non-governmental organizations criticized the Beijing bid and its selection due to concerns about China's human rights record. In response, supporters of the Beijing bid suggested that hosting the games might lead to "progress" on human rights and other issues. Some IOC delegates also expressed concerns about air pollution and heat in Beijing during the summer, and its effects on athletes participating in the games. In order to address such concerns, the Beijing bid included plans to reduce both air and water pollution in the city in advance of the games.

== Bidding process ==
The Olympic bidding process begins with the submission of a city's application to the International Olympic Committee (IOC) by its National Olympic Committee (NOC) and ends with the election of the host city by the members of the IOC during an ordinary session. The process is governed by the Olympic Charter, as stated in Chapter 5, Rule 34.

The bidding process for the 2008 Summer Olympics was the first in which the process consisted of two phases. Subsequent bidding processes have followed the same model. During the first phase, which begins immediately after the bid submission deadline, the "applicant cities" are required to answer a questionnaire covering themes of importance to a successful Games organisation. This information allows the IOC to analyse the cities' hosting capacities and the strengths and weaknesses of their plans. Following a detailed study of the submitted questionnaires and ensuing reports, the IOC Executive Board selects the cities that are qualified to proceed to the next phase. The second phase is the true candidature stage: the accepted applicant cities (from now on referred to as "candidate cities") are required to submit a second questionnaire in the form of an extended, more detailed, candidature file. These files are carefully studied by the IOC Evaluation Commission, a group composed of IOC members, representatives of international sport federations, NOCs, athletes, the International Paralympic Committee, and international experts in various fields. The members of the Evaluation Commission then make four-day inspection visits to each of the candidate cities, where they check the proposed venues and are briefed about details of the themes covered in the candidature file. The Evaluation Commission communicates the results of its inspections in a report sent to the IOC members up to one month before the electing IOC Session.

The IOC Session in which a host city is elected takes place in a country that did not submit an application to stage the Olympics. The election is made by the assembled active IOC members (excluding honorary and honour members), each possessing one vote. Members from countries that have a city taking part in the election cannot vote while the city is in the running. The voting is conducted in a succession of rounds until one bid achieves an absolute majority of votes; if this does not happen in the first round, the bid with the fewest votes is eliminated and another voting round begins. In the case of a tie for the lowest number of votes, a special runoff vote is carried out, with the winner proceeding to the next round. After each round, the eliminated bid is announced. Following the announcement of the host city, the successful bid delegation signs the "Host City Contract" with the IOC, which delegates the responsibilities of the Games organisation to the city and respective NOC.

=== Potential applicant cities ===
A number of cities expressed some interest in bidding or were mentioned as potential bidders for the 2008 Summer Olympics, but did not do so. These bids were not internally selected by the NOC (in case of more than one bidding city from the same country), were not put forward to the IOC, were withdrawn before filing the necessary paperwork, or never rose above speculation. Rio de Janeiro, Brazil received early funding to develop a bid for the 2008 Games but instead decided to bid for the 2012 games. Cape Town, South Africa and Buenos Aires, Argentina lost bids for the 2004 Summer Olympics and media reports suggested they might shift their bids to the 2008 Games, although they did not. Monterrey, Mexico was in the earliest stages of organizing a bid but did not complete the process. Other cities hinted at submitting bids or were mentioned as possible bidders in media reports but did not do so, including: Lisbon, Portugal; Krasnaya Polyana, Russia; a joint Israel/Palestinian bid; New York City, United States; Prague, Czech Republic; Busan, South Korea; Vancouver, British Columbia, Canada (Vancouver was bidding for the 2010 Winter Olympics); and Moscow, Russia.

=== Evaluation of applicant cities ===
Ten cities applied to host the 2008 Summer Olympics. Applicant cities were required to submit responses to a written questionnaire by June 20, 2000. They were also given documents outlining the selection process and the IOC's Code of Ethics. The IOC Candidature Acceptance Working Group analyzed the responses and quantified the applicant's potential to be a host city based on eleven criteria: government support and public opinion, general infrastructure, sports infrastructure, olympic village, environmental conditions and impact, accommodation, transport, security, experience from past sports events, finance, and the general concept. Each of these criteria was given a weight which was then used to calculate an overall score for that applicant city. If a city did not get a final score of at least 6 out of 10, they would not be recommended for candidature.

In its final report, the Candidature Acceptance Working Group recommended only four cities as meeting the minimum standard for being a host city, as denoted by a score of 6 on their scale. These cities were Beijing, China; Osaka, Japan; Paris, France; and Toronto, Ontario, Canada. The IOC Executive Committee received this report and met on August 28, 2000, to decide which applicant cities would become candidate cities. When they met, the executive committee chose to promote five cities to candidature, the four recommended by the Working Group as well as Istanbul, Turkey. As stipulated, the IOC granted them the right to use the Olympic rings on their candidature emblem, together with a label identifying each as a Candidate City.^{[a]} The following five cities which submitted bids did not make the IOC's short list:

- Bangkok, Thailand
- Cairo, Egypt
- Havana, Cuba
- Kuala Lumpur, Malaysia
- Seville, Spain

Table of scores given by the IOC Working Group to assess the quality and feasibility of the 2008 Applicant cities
Criteria	Weight	Bangkok		Beijing		Cairo		Havana		Istanbul		Kuala Lumpur		Osaka		Paris		Seville		Toronto	
Criteria	Weight	THA		CHN		EGY		CUB		TUR		MAS		JPN		FRA		ESP		CAN	
Criteria	Weight	Min	Max	Min	Max	Min	Max	Min	Max	Min	Max	Min	Max	Min	Max	Min	Max	Min	Max	Min	Max
Accommodation	5	10.0	10.0	9.8	10.0	4.4	4.6	3.2	3.9	5.9	6.5	5.1	5.4	9.6	9.8	10.0	10.0	3.6	3.9	7.7	7.9
Environmental conditions and impact	2	4.3	6.2	5.3	6.8	2.8	3.8	4.3	5.3	5.8	7.2	3.0	4.8	7.0	8.0	7.0	8.0	5.0	6.8	7.5	8.2
Experience from past sports events	2	6.0	7.0	6.0	7.0	5.0	7.0	5.0	7.0	4.5	6.5	5.0	7.0	7.5	8.5	8.5	9.5	7.5	8.5	7.0	8.5
General infrastructure	5	1.5	3.2	3.8	5.4	0.6	2.3	0.6	1.3	3.7	4.6	4.5	6.7	7.1	8.0	7.6	8.5	3.5	5.0	6.3	7.6
Government support, public opinion	1	5.3	6.0	6.8	7.4	5.4	6.1	5.3	6.0	6.1	6.7	5.1	5.7	6.7	6.7	6.7	6.7	6.7	6.7	6.8	7.5
Olympic Village	4	5.3	6.8	8.0	9.0	4.4	6.5	6.8	8.1	5.5	7.2	5.3	6.8	5.8	8.2	7.2	8.7	7.2	8.6	5.9	8.0
General concept	3	4.0	5.0	7.0	8.0	4.0	5.0	4.0	5.0	6.0	7.0	3.0	5.0	6.0	7.0	8.0	9.0	4.0	7.0	6.0	8.0
Security	3	5.4	7.3	6.4	7.7	4.9	6.4	6.3	7.0	5.7	7.1	6.1	7.1	7.4	8.7	7.0	8.4	6.6	7.9	8.0	9.0
Sports infrastructure	4	3.6	5.9	6.3	7.9	3.1	6.3	2.0	5.3	5.9	7.9	3.1	4.6	6.0	8.0	7.2	8.5	6.5	7.8	7.2	8.6
Transport infrastructure	4	3.7	5.4	6.3	7.6	3.7	4.7	3.6	5.3	6.1	7.6	5.6	7.4	6.9	7.9	7.7	9.0	4.2	6.4	7.5	8.7

=== Evaluation of candidate cities ===
Each of the five candidate cities was then evaluated by the IOC's fourteen member Evaluation Commission, chaired by Hein Verbruggen. These evaluations included site visits to each of the host cities and analysis of each city's potential across 18 themes. The four-day-long visits occurred between February 21 and March 28, 2001, with visits to each specific city on the following dates:

- (China) Beijing — February 21–24
- (Japan) Osaka — February 26–March 1
- (Canada) Toronto — March 8–11
- (Turkey) Istanbul — March 21–24
- (France) Paris — March 26–29

The Commission attempted to identify any major risks the IOC would be taking if each city were chosen to host the Games. In its final report, the Commission refrained from ranking each of the cities or identifying a favorite. Instead, they identified three cities as excellent candidates; Beijing, Paris, and Toronto. In effect, the commission recommended each of these cities equally. In rejecting Istanbul, they expressed concerns about the ability of the city to coordinate financing and construction of infrastructure. In particular, they were concerned that the plans for transportation infrastructure improvements would be difficult to achieve. Osaka was also not rated excellent due to concerns about financing and traffic congestion.

Their report was submitted to the IOC President and executive committee on May 15, 2001. Following that meeting, an anonymous document circulated that claimed IOC President Juan Antonio Samaranch had inappropriately placed pressure on the Evaluation Commission during the drafting of its report. An IOC press release on June 13, 2001, categorically denied those rumors.

=== Final selection process ===
The 112th session of the IOC, where the decision about the host city took place, was held in Moscow, Russia from July 13–16, 2001. Voting on the question of the host city took place on July 13, 2001. Presentations of the candidate cities began at 9:30 AM MSK (UTC+04:00) in the Congress Hall of Moscow's World Trade Center. This was followed by the official presentation of the Evaluation Committee report to the IOC delegates and, soon after, the delegates began casting their votes. Of the 122 members of the IOC at the time, 105 were eligible to vote in the first round. Members who were not present or who represented countries with candidate cities were not allowed by IOC rules to vote. However, after the elimination of a city in each round, members who had previously been barred from voting due to that city's candidacy were allowed to vote in subsequent rounds. The IOC members who were unable to vote included:

IOC members unable to vote in the 2008 Host City Election (17)
Members from countries with candidate cities (13)	Absent members (4)
(Canada) Charmaine Crooks; (Canada) Paul Henderson; (Canada) Richard W. Pound; (Canada) Robert Steadward; (China) He Zhenliang; (China) Lu Chengrong; (China) Yu Zaiqing; (France) Guy Drut; (France) Jean-Claude Killy; (France) Henri Sérandour; (Japan) Chiharu Igaya; (Japan) Shunichiro Okano; (Turkey) Sinan Erdem	(Czech Republic) Věra Čáslavská; (Belgium) Alexandre de Merode; (Indonesia) Mohamad Bob Hasan; (Ivory Coast) Lassana Palenfo

At the end of the first round of voting, only Beijing, Toronto, Paris, and Istanbul remained; Osaka was eliminated after having received only six votes. Beijing had opened a wide lead, however, receiving more than double the number of votes received by second place Toronto. In the second round, Beijing received enough votes to have an absolute majority (possibly due to the Osaka supporters switching to its side) and no subsequent rounds of voting were required. The results of the second round were as follows: Beijing garnered 56 votes, Toronto 22, Paris 18, and Istanbul 9. According to IOC rules Beijing at that point became the official host city for the 2008 Summer Olympics. Results from the two rounds of voting were as follows:

2008 Host City Election — ballot results
City	Country (NOC)	Round 1	Round 2
Beijing	China	44	56
Toronto	Canada	20	22
Paris	France	15	18
Istanbul	Turkey	17	9
Osaka	Japan	6	—

== Bidding cities ==
=== Candidate cities ===
Logo	City	Country	National Olympic Committee	Result
	Beijing	China	Chinese Olympic Committee (CHN)	Winner
Beijing 2008 was the successful bid for the 2008 Summer Olympics. Eight years earlier, Beijing proposed a competitive bid to host the 2000 Summer Olympics, losing to Sydney, Australia. The selection of Sydney was an upset, as Beijing led in the first three rounds of voting that year and lost in the final round by only two votes. The loss was despite intense lobbying of the IOC by China, despite having a better project, news reports at the time suggested that Sydney won the process because it was seen as a safe choice; criticism of China's human rights record and concerns about its lack of experience in hosting major sporting events, some IOC members saw this proposal as risky. By contrast, during the 2008 bid and after its selection as a host city, Chinese officials suggested that hosting the games would actually improve China's human rights record. The IOC Evaluation Committee report emphasized strong public support, guarantees of construction of venues, and strong government support as strengths of the Beijing bid. They also lauded the city's plan for addressing its pollution problems, particularly with air pollution, in the lead-up to the Games.
	Toronto	Canada	Canadian Olympic Committee (COC)	First runner-up
Main article: Toronto bid for the 2008 Summer Olympics The city of Toronto, Ontario, Canada submitted a bid for the games, and received the second most votes. Two years after Toronto lost the bid, Vancouver was later selected to host the 2010 Winter Olympics.
	Paris	France	French National Olympic and Sports Committee (CNOSF)	Second runner-up.
Main article: Paris bid for the 2008 Summer Olympics The city of Paris, France submitted a bid for the games, and received the third most votes. Paris would go on to land the 2024 Summer Olympics.
Logo of Istanbul's campaign.	Istanbul	Turkey	Turkish Olympic Committee (TMOK)	Third runner-up
Logo of Istanbul's campaign.	The city of Istanbul, Turkey submitted a bid for the games, and received the fourth most votes.			
	Osaka	Japan	Japanese Olympic Committee (JOC)	Fourth runner-up
Main article: Osaka bid for the 2008 Summer Olympics The city of Osaka, Japan submitted a bid for the games, and received the fifth most votes. Twelve years after Osaka lost the bid, Tokyo was later chosen to host the 2020 Summer Olympics.

== Proposed dates ==
City	Games of the XXIX Olympiad	XIII Paralympic Games
Beijing	25 July - 10 August	27 August - 7 September
Toronto	25 July - 10 August	20 - 31 August
Paris	18 July - 3 August	22 August - 2 September
Istanbul	18 July - 3 August	13 - 24 August
Osaka	Not specified	17 - 28 August

== Criticism of Beijing's selection ==
While many nations praised the choice of Beijing, opposing groups objected arguing that China's human rights issues made it unfit for the honor. The European Parliament issued a resolution on Beijing's bid to host the 2008 Summer Olympics. To quell concerns over this, Beijing chose the motto of "New Beijing, Great Olympics" in order to emphasize the country's movement towards new ideals for the new millennium.

In its bid for the Summer Olympics made in 2001, the PRC made several promises to the IOC regarding improvements with human rights, press freedoms, and environmental concerns. However, it was widely reported by western media sources that China failed to live up to the guarantees it made in order to bolster its chances of winning the bid for the games.

Beijing Olympic bid chief Wang Wei stated in 2001:

We will give the media complete freedom to report when they come to China... We are confident that the Games coming to China not only promote our economy but also enhances all social conditions, including education, health and human rights."

However, the human rights group Amnesty International released a statement marking the 10-day countdown to the games stating that:

The Chinese authorities have broken their promise to improve the country’s human rights situation and betrayed the core values of the Olympics. There has been no progress towards fulfilling these promises, only continued deterioration. Unless the authorities make a swift change of direction, the legacy of the Beijing Olympics will not be positive for human rights in China."

Though the PRC publicly claimed in 2001 that it would improve human rights in China, Amnesty International stated in 2008 that, "In the run-up to the Olympics, the Chinese authorities have locked up, put under house arrest and forcibly removed individuals they believe may threaten the image of “stability” and “harmony” they want to present to the world. They must release all imprisoned peaceful activists, allow foreign and national journalists to report freely and make further progress towards the elimination of the death penalty." In late July, U.S. senator Sam Brownback announced that he had received evidence (in the form of an official memo from China's Public Security Bureau) that foreign-owned hotels in China had been ordered by the Chinese government to comply with electronic surveillance of guests by installing special equipment (called the Security Management System for Internet Access from Public Places), or face "severe retaliation." On July 30, 2008, the US House of Representatives passed a resolution by 419 votes to 1 that called for immediate action to stop the arrests of civil activists and Tibetans and to put pressure on China to stop supporting Burma and Sudan.

Despite initial guarantees of total press freedom by the PRC in 2001, and assurances from the IOC in early 2008 that journalists would have unfettered access to the internet, the Beijing Organizing Committee for the Olympic Games announced in late July that China would allow only "convenient" access —still blocking web sites the PRC deemed inappropriate, particularly those critical of China's involvement in Tibet, Darfur, Burma, the 1989 protests at Tiananmen Square, and HIV/AIDS issues in China, as well as its crackdown on spiritual groups such as Falun Gong. Chinese authorities have also blocked passports for foreign journalists. The government justified these actions by claiming that these journalists were planning to report on political topics rather than the Olympics, and stated on July 31 that "The Chinese government won't allow the spread of any information that is forbidden by law or harms national interests on the Internet." The NGO, Human Rights Watch has alleged that China has failed to keep its press freedom promise, and one IOC committee member commented anonymously that "Had the I.O.C....known seven years ago that there would be severe restrictions...then I seriously doubt whether Beijing would have been awarded the Olympics".

On August 1, 2008, the IOC announced that the Chinese organizers, the Beijing Organizing Committee for the Olympic Games (BOCOG), had agreed to lift all Internet restrictions for media covering the Beijing Games. "The issue has been solved," vice-president Gunilla Lindberg said. "The IOC Coordination Commission and BOCOG met last night and agreed. Internet use will be just like in any Olympics."

China pledged to "Deliver Clean Energy Towards a Harmonious World" and that by 2008, measurements of carbon monoxide, nitrogen dioxide and sulfur dioxide would meet World Health Organization standards and airborne particle density would be reduced to the level of major cities in developed countries, however the IOC stated that Beijing had so far met only WHO 2005 interim guidelines, which are significantly less restrictive, and that "Official data during the Aug. 8 to Aug. 24 Olympic period indicates air quality was actually worse in 2006 and 2007 than in 2000 and 2001." An analysis of August 2007 data found that Beijing's air registered 123 micrograms of particulate matter per cubic meter, more than double the WHO guideline of 50 micrograms per cubic meter for short-term exposure. China's initial failure prior to the games to meet these standards has caused concern among some Olympics athletes, particularly long-distance runners such as world marathon record holder Haile Gebrselassie, considered the world's greatest long-distance runner, who has said he will skip the long-distance running event in Beijing because of the city's poor air quality and fears his health could be damaged by running through the streets of the Chinese capital, a decision he would later regret. Despite the initial concerns over the air quality, the Beijing air had improved to healthy levels of particle matter by the first week of the games, and officials stated that the particles were actually mostly caused by moisture.

== Notes ==
- ^{a} The Olympic emblem (Olympic rings) is a copyrighted logo of the International Olympic Committee (IOC); the organization exclusively permits candidate cities, those high-scoring cities chosen from the applicant cities list, to use the Olympic emblem in their bid logos.
