= Osaka bid for the 2008 Summer Olympics =

Bids for the 2008 Summer Olympics and Paralympics
Overview
- Games of the XXIX Olympiad; XIII Paralympic Games
- Winner: Beijing; Runner-up: Toronto; Shortlist: Paris · Istanbul · Osaka

Details
- City: Osaka, Japan
- NOC: Japanese Olympic Committee (JOC)

Previous Games hosted
- None (Japan hosted the 1964 Summer Olympics in Tokyo)

Decision
- Result: 4th Runner-up (6 votes)

Osaka 2008 (Japanese: 大阪2008) was one of the five short-listed bids for the 2008 Games, presented by the city of Osaka, Japan. The city won its right to represent Japan over Yokohama when chosen by the Japanese Olympic Committee.

The IOC Evaluation Commission Report from May 15, 2001, said that "a combination of excellent venues and a proven ability within the country to organize major multi-sport events would provide a good basis for the hosting of an Olympic Games".

The Report praised the fact that many facilities have already been completed on Maishima Island and are open for public use. The Olympic Stadium and The Olympic Indoor Swimming Pool would be constructed on the island to serve as a stage for world-class athletic competition. The Olympic Village was planned to be constructed on Yumeshima, man-made island only 400 metres from Maishima. It was considered a secure location, surrounded by the sea with a green wooded landscape, which would enable athletes to relax in comfort. Most sport venues were within 20 kilometres of the Olympic Village.

However, potential transport congestion was a consideration. Concerns existed about the financial implications for the city of the scale of the infrastructure and Games project, making delivery of the Games plans more difficult. The commission was "not confident that this issue could be satisfactorily addressed."

Osaka was eliminated in the first round of the ballot to select a host city at the 113th IOC meeting in July 2001 in Moscow, Russia. Japan had not hosted the Summer Olympic Games until Tokyo was later chosen to host the 2020 Summer Olympics in September 2013.

== Bid details ==
The proposed venues concept comprised:

=== Sports Venues ===
Existing:

- Intex Osaka - badminton, fencing,
- Osaka Dome - baseball, basketball, gymnastics (artistic),
- Green Stadium, Kobe - baseball
- Nanko Central Baseball Stadium - baseball
- Namihaya Dome - baseball
- Sumiyoshi Sports Center - boxing
- Lake Biwa - canoe-kayak (flatwater)
- Seta River - canoe-kayak (slalom)
- Senji New Town Road Circuit Course - cycling (road)
- Tsurumi-Ryoukuchi Equestrian Center - equestrian (jumping, dressage)
- Nagai Stadium - football (group matches)
- EXPO'70 Commemorative Stadium - football (group matches)
- Kobe City Misaki Park Stadium - football (group matches)
- Kobe Universiade Memorial Stadium - football (group matches)
- Nishikyogoku Athletic Stadium - football (group matches)
- Osaka Prefectural Gymnasium - gymnastics (rhythmic)
- Osaka Municipal Central Gymnasium - handball
- Nagai Stadium - hockey
- Osaka Pool - waterpolo
- Maishima Baseball Stadium - softball
- Maishima Arena - taekwondo, table tennis
- Utsubo Tennis Center - tennis
- Rinku Town Triathlon Course - triathlon
- Osaka-jo Hall - volleyball

Planned:

- Osaka City University Gymnasium - weightlifting
- Martial Arts Hall - judo, wrestling
- Osaka Bay (Maishima Marina) - sailing
- Higashinari Culture and Sports Center - volleyball

Additional:

- Maishima Olympic Stadium - opening and closing ceremony, athletics, football final
- Lake Biwa Regatta Course - rowing
- EXPO'70 Commemorative Park Velodrome - cycling (track)
- Misaki Mountain Bike Center - cycling (mountain bike)
- Shinodayama Equestrian Center - equestrian (3-day event)
- Osaka Olympic Indoor Pool - swimming, diving, synchronized swimming
- Tsurumi-Ryoukuchi Modern Pentathlon Venues - modern pentathlon
- Takatsuki Shooting Center - shooting
- Osaka Castle Park Archery Center - archery
- Yumeshima Beach Volleyball Center - beach volleyball

=== Non-sports Venues ===
- Yumeshima Island - Main Olympic Village and Media Village
- Ōtsu - Additional Olympic Village (for rowing and canoeing athletes)
- Sakishima Island - Main Press Center, International Broadcast Center
- Rihga Royal Hotel - IOC Hotel
