= The Greatest American Hero =

American superhero television series (1981–1983)

- Genre: Sci-fi; Comedy drama; Fantasy; Superhero
- Created by: Stephen J. Cannell
- Starring: William Katt; Robert Culp; Connie Sellecca; Michael Paré; Faye Grant; Jesse D. Goins
- Theme music composer: Mike Post; Stephen Geyer
- Opening theme: "Theme from The Greatest American Hero (Believe It or Not)"; Performed by Joey Scarbury
- Composer: Mike Post
- Country of origin: United States
- Original language: English
- No. of seasons: 3
- No. of episodes: 45 (5 unaired) (list of episodes)

Production
- Executive producer: Stephen J. Cannell
- Producers: Juanita Bartlett; Frank Lupo; Christopher Nelson; Jo Swerling Jr.
- Production locations: Santa Clarita, California; Sun Valley, Los Angeles, California; Universal Studios - 100 Universal City Plaza, Universal City, California
- Running time: 60 minutes (with commercials)
- Production company: Stephen J. Cannell Productions

Original release
- Network: ABC
- Release: March 18, 1981 – February 3, 1983

The Greatest American Hero is an American comedy-drama superhero television series that aired on ABC. Created by producer Stephen J. Cannell, it premiered as a two-hour pilot movie on March 18, 1981, and ran until February 2, 1983. The series features William Katt as high school special education teacher Ralph Hinkley, Robert Culp as FBI agent Bill Maxwell, and Connie Sellecca as lawyer Pam Davidson.

The series chronicles Ralph's adventures after a group of aliens gives him a red and black suit that grants him superhuman abilities. Unfortunately for Ralph, he loses the instruction book and must learn how to use the suit's powers by trial and error, often with comical results.

The theme song, sung by Joey Scarbury, was a hit when released as a single.

== Premise ==
Ralph Hinkley is a Los Angeles teacher of remedial education high school students. During a school field trip, Ralph encounters extraterrestrials who give him a suit which endows him with superhuman abilities. During the encounter, he is also instructed by the aliens to thereafter collaborate with FBI Special Agent Bill Maxwell. Their instructions are to use the suit as a means to fight crime and injustice in the world.

Subsequently, attorney Pam Davidson, who handled Ralph's divorce, also encounters the aliens. Through some coercion, she eventually agrees, on occasion, to join Ralph and Bill during missions.

Also seen regularly were Rhonda Blake, Tony Villicana, Cyler Johnson and Paco Rodriguez, four of Ralph's students; and Bill's FBI supervisor Les Carlisle.

=== Suit and hero persona ===
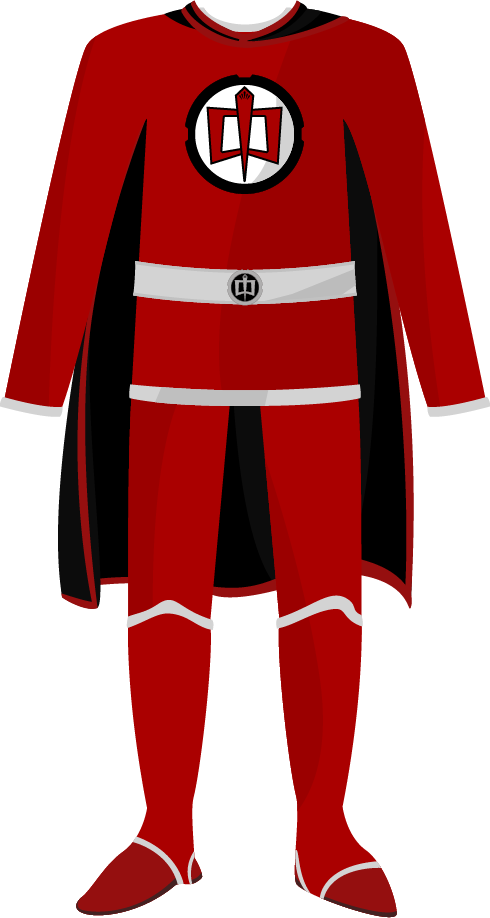
The suit that Ralph receives from the aliens.

Ralph's uniform grants him the powers of flight, super strength, invulnerability, invisibility, precognition, telekinesis, X-ray vision, super speed, pyrokinesis, shrinking, psychometry ("holographic vision"), and even the ability to detect the supernatural. As Ralph lost the suit's instruction manual, his discovery of these different powers is often accidental. Notably, while the suit enables Ralph to fly, it does not endow him with any particular skill at landing, so he frequently crashes in an undignified (though uninjured) heap. In the episode "Fire Man" he displays resistance to fire/heat and uses "super exhalation" (the ability to blow out a flamethrower, or any other large source of fire); he also uses this ability in the episode "There's Just No Accounting...", to extinguish a Molotov cocktail. Ralph also shows signs of being able to control minds after he is exposed to high doses of plutonium radiation. In the season two final episode, "Lilacs, Mr. Maxwell", Ralph is shown to control a dog via a hologram. This may have been an improvisational power of the suit but is not tried again in later episodes. In "The Shock Will Kill You", the suit becomes strongly magnetized.

In the season two episode "Don't Mess Around with Jim", Ralph and Maxwell learn they are not the first duo who received such a uniform. Jim "J.J." Beck had received the suit, and Marshall Dunn was his partner, much like Ralph and Maxwell operated. But Jim was overwhelmed with the power of the suit, and he used it selfishly and for ill-gotten gains, until the aliens discovered this and took the suit away. It is unknown whether or not there were others before Jim who were visited by the aliens. In "Divorce Venusian Style", the pair meet one of the aliens, whose world was apparently destroyed (which hints as to why the aliens want to protect humanity) and calls Earth one of the few remaining "garden planets". Ralph is given another instruction book during this encounter—supposedly the aliens' last copy, but he loses it as well.

In the episode "Vanity, Says the Preacher", it is also revealed there are several humans in seeming "suspended animation" aboard the aliens' ship (Bill speculates that they are possible replacements for them).

Hinkley's hero persona never receives an actual "superhero name" either, although Joey Scarbury sings the Elton John song "Rocket Man" in the pilot. In the pilot episode, Ralph sarcastically refers to himself as "Captain Crash" in reference to his terrible flying ability; and later "Captain Gonzo" in the episode "The Shock Will Kill You".

Like his character, William Katt found the suit very uncomfortable and hated wearing it. Producers made various modifications to the suit to help him and accommodated him by scheduling filming so he would not have to wear it all day during a shoot.

=== Symbol ===
On the Season 1 DVD, Stephen J. Cannell notes that the symbol design on the front of the suit is actually based on a pair of scissors that he had on his desk during the design of the uniform. He said that the costume designer asked him what he wanted the suit's chest emblem to look like. He said he had not really thought about it. The designer then picked the scissors up off the desk, held them upside down, and said "That's your emblem". Cannell was fine with that decision.

Red Dragon mahjong tile

By coincidence, the symbol on Ralph's uniform resembles the Chinese character for "center" 中. As the symbol is red in color with white background, Hong Kong television station TVB titled the Cantonese-dubbed version of the show Fēi Tīn Hùhng Jūng Hahp (飛天紅中俠), meaning "Flying Red Center Hero", in reference to the red center mahjong tile. An alternate translation of "jūng" in Cantonese is "justice", which gave the other meaning for the title of the show "Flying Red Justice Hero". This alternate translation of the show title alludes to the mandate by the alien grantor to use the suit as a means to fight crime and injustice in the world.

The symbol's bilateral symmetry seemingly avoided the "backward S" problem encountered on the Adventures of Superman. For the low-budget 1950s series, editors would on occasion "flop" stock footage of George Reeves in flight, causing the "S" shield to appear reversed. However, in many Greatest American Hero composite flying sequences, Ralph wore a watch and the timepiece alternates from one wrist to the other, especially during extended flying sequences.

== Cast and characters ==
- William Katt as Ralph Hinkley/Hanley
- Robert Culp as Bill Maxwell
- Connie Sellecca as Pam Davidson
- Faye Grant as Rhonda Blake
- Michael Paré as Tony Villicana
- Jesse D. Goins as Cyler Johnson
- Don Cervantes as Paco Rodriguez
- William Bogert as Les Carlisle

=== Ralph's surname ===
The main character's name was originally Ralph Hinkley, but after the assassination attempt on Ronald Reagan by John Hinckley Jr., on March 30, 1981, the character's last name was hurriedly changed to "Hanley" in two episodes. In "Here's Looking at You, Kid", aired within days of the incident, this was accomplished by overdubbing a student's use of "Mister Hinkley" to "Mister H," and later by dropping out the audio and dubbing jet engine roars over June Lockhart's two mentions of Ralph's surname in an airport scene. Two weeks later in "Reseda Rose," the name "Hinkley" was overdubbed "Hanley" whenever the character's last name was spoken aloud, which happened frequently in the episode. This was the only episode in which the name "Hanley" was spoken aloud; for the rest of the abbreviated first season (which only lasted 9 episodes), the character was generally referred to as either "Ralph" or "Mister H". The only other instance of the use of the name Hanley was in episode 9, "The Best Desk Scenario," in which Ralph is given a promotion and his own office space, and we see the name "Ralph Hanley" on the door plaque. By the season 2 premiere "The Two-Hundred-Mile-an-Hour Fast Ball" (the very next episode in viewing order), the show's producers returned the character's surname to the original Hinkley.

== Episodes ==
Season	Episodes	Originally released	
Season	Episodes	First released	Last released
1	9	March 18, 1981	May 13, 1981
2	22	November 4, 1981	April 28, 1982
3	14	October 29, 1982	February 3, 1983

== Production ==
On the series' season 1 DVD set, Stephen J. Cannell explained that he had planned The Greatest American Hero as a series emphasizing real-life problems, whereas when a change of management occurred in ABC, they requested more heroic, save-the-day-type episodes. As agreed originally between Cannell and then ABC executives Marcy Carsey and Tom Werner, the powers would be in the suit, not the man (though the suit would only work for him) and Ralph would try to solve ordinary-type problems, such as trying to stop corruption in Major League Baseball ("The Two Hundred Mile-an-Hour Fastball") or an assassination attempt ("The Best Desk Scenario"). The series initially emphasized what Cannell referred to as "character comedy" based on human flaws such as envy (in the aforementioned "The Best Desk Scenario") or hypochondria ("Plague"). The series differed from previous superhero shows because of the emphasis on (especially Ralph) "rising above" superhero antics and instead exploring what it was like to live in that environment.

Cannell was trying to avoid save-the-day-type episodes, as per the original Adventures of Superman television series, but according to Cannell on the DVD set, when Carsey and Werner left ABC (soon after the show was purchased by the network) the new network executives wanted the show to be more like a children's show than an adults' show. So, they pushed for the types of shows that Cannell did not want, shows that involved Ralph trying to stop some sort of calamity from happening, including nuclear war ("Operation Spoilsport") and even a Loch Ness Monster-type of creature ("The Devil in the Deep Blue Sea"). For the season two finale, a serious and appropriate for the time (considering the Cold War) episode was produced: "Lilacs, Mr. Maxwell", written and directed by Robert Culp. The episode's story concerns a KGB mole-agent (played by guest star Dixie Carter) placed into the FBI with the sole purpose of discovering the methods used by agent Bill Maxwell in catching spies and other assorted villains. Cannell gave Culp free rein to produce the episode.

This was also the first of Cannell's series to feature the "Stephen J. Cannell Productions" logo. The production company's first series Tenspeed and Brown Shoe did not feature the logo.

=== Theme song ===
The theme song (and variants of it) have been used frequently outside of the show. "Believe It or Not" was composed by Mike Post (music) and Stephen Geyer (lyrics) and sung by Joey Scarbury. The theme song became well known during the show's run. "Believe it or Not" debuted in the Top 40 of the Billboard Hot 100, peaking at No. 2. It also peaked at the No. 1 position on both the Cashbox and Record World Top 100 Singles charts.

=== Superman and Green Lantern connections ===
The powers of the red suit were somewhat generic, but they still were similar enough to the abilities of Superman that Warner Bros., the owners of DC Comics, filed a lawsuit against ABC. Warner Bros. Inc. v. American Broadcasting Companies, Inc. was ultimately dismissed.

The series occasionally made reference to Superman in relation to Ralph's situations. In the pilot episode, while Ralph ponders whether to accept the suit, he observes his son watching the Super Friends cartoon. Batman is heard to say, "We need one more Super Friend who can fly!" During the Hospital scene, while Ralph is pushed down the hall in a wheelchair, someone is heard to say enthusiastically "That's a bad outfit, Jim", a reference to the 1978 movie when Clark Kent uses the phone booth to change into Superman to save Lois from the helicopter crash. In a later scene, having yet to convince Pam he really is a superhero, Ralph jokes, "Look at it this way. You're one step ahead of Lois Lane: she never found out who Clark Kent really was." In "Saturday on Sunset Boulevard", Ralph needs to change his clothing quickly. Seeing a telephone booth, he grumbles, "No! Never!", but ends up using it. Later, while Ralph struggles to get changed in the back of Bill's car, Bill notes "We need to get you a bigger phone booth."

== Home media ==
Anchor Bay Entertainment company released the complete series in DVD format in Region 1 for the first time during 2005. Additionally, on October 3, 2006, they released a special 13-disc boxed set that includes all 43 episodes of the series as well as other bonus material. However, both the individual DVD sets and the complete boxed set are missing original performances by Mike Post and Joey Scarbury whenever the song concerned originated by another artist.

On October 14, 2009, it was announced that Mill Creek Entertainment company had acquired the rights to several Stephen J. Cannell series, including The Greatest American Hero. They subsequently re-released the first season as well as a complete series box set on May 18, 2010. Season 2 was re-released on October 12, 2010.

On November 10, 2011, Mill Creek Entertainment released The Greatest American Heroine TV movie on DVD.

On September 26, 2017, Cinedigm re-released The Greatest American Hero: The Complete Series on DVD in Region 1.

Shout! Factory acquired the distribution rights to The Greatest American Hero and The Greatest American Heroine along with several other Stephen J. Cannell series on March 11, 2020.

On June 30, 2022, Visual Entertainment released The Greatest American Hero: The Complete Collection on DVD in Region 1.

Title	Ep. #	Release date
Season 1	9	February 15, 2005; May 18, 2010 (re-release)
Season 2	22	April 5, 2005; October 12, 2010 (re-release)
Season 3	13	August 2, 2005
Complete Series	43	October 3, 2006; September 26, 2017 (re-release); June 30, 2022 (re-release)
The Greatest American Heroine	1	November 10, 2011

== Revivals ==
=== The Greatest American Heroine ===
During 1986, the original principal cast reunited for a pilot movie for a new NBC series to be named The Greatest American Heroine, which did not result in a new series, and the pilot was never broadcast by NBC. Ultimately, the pilot was re-edited as an episode of the original series (complete with original opening credits and theme), and added to syndication sets of the original series aired on several local television stations in the late 1980s, for which it is the final episode. Immediately after the beginning credits, the episode's title card is superimposed over a nighttime view of the Los Angeles skyline, reading "The Greatest American Hero" before appending the letters "i n e" individually to the sound of the NBC chimes. The chimes were a nod to NBC and its president, Brandon Tartikoff, who had expressed interest in reviving the series.

The pilot movie reveals that, several years after the final episode, Ralph's secret identity was finally revealed to the public, resulting in his becoming a celebrity. This angers the aliens who gave him the suit, and they charge him with finding a new hero to wear the costume and use its powers for fighting evil. Once the transfer is made, they explain, all memory of Ralph's exploits will be purged from the world's memory and remembered only by Ralph, Pam, and Bill.

Bill begins their search by researching people with desired hero qualities, but Ralph finds a young woman named Holly Hathaway (Mary Ellen Stuart), an elementary school teacher who spends her off-hours time looking for lost kittens, raising environmental awareness, and serving as a foster mother. Bill, Pam, and Ralph meet in the desert, where Ralph tells Bill about Holly. He reacts visibly to his new partner being a "skirt" before Holly arrives, flying in wearing a new version of the suit made for her, and she pledges to help Bill. The original trio say their final farewells, and even the stoic Maxwell reveals his true emotions as he says goodbye to Ralph and calling Pam a trouper—"...one of the best!" Holly reacts emotionally to the fond farewells but breaks the somber mood as she accidentally pulls the door off of Bill's sedan.

The rest of the episode deals with Holly learning how to use the suit with Bill Maxwell's guidance, and the pair trying to develop a working relationship. It ends with Bill overhearing a conversation between Holly and her foster daughter in which Holly refers to Bill as a good person. Bill is then shown speaking into a recorder he uses as his "diary" to suggest that maybe Holly is the right person to wear the suit after all.

=== Reboot ===
On August 29, 2014, Deadline Hollywood published an article reporting that the Fox Network had ordered a pilot for a new version of the show. The pilot was to be produced by Phil Lord and Christopher Miller, both of whom wrote and directed The Lego Movie.

Deadline reported on September 8, 2017, that Rachna Fruchbom and Nahnatchka Khan would produce a female-led reboot for 20th Century Fox TV and ABC Studios. The suit was to be donned by Meera, an Indian-American woman. Actress Hannah Simone was cast as the lead for the reboot.

On February 12, 2018, Simone was announced as the lead in ABC's reboot; however, ABC declined to pick up the series.

== Comics ==
During July 2008, it was announced that Katt was writing a comic book series based on the television series for his publishing company, Catastrophic Comics, in conjunction with Arcana Studios. The three-issue miniseries debuted later that year, featuring an updated retelling of the original pilot episode set in the present. Katt also contributes to the show's Facebook page.

In 2026, Amp Comics published a 5-issue miniseries set 43 years after the show ended. The comic was written by Don Handfield with art by Alper Geçgel and Faradilla Nurmalize.

== See also ==
- Reluctant hero – a heroic archetype found in fiction, typically portrayed as an everyman forced to rise to heroism, or as a person with unwanted special abilities
