= Jesse D. Goins =

American actor

Jesse D. Goins (born July 23, 1952) is an American film and television actor. He is known for his role in the 1980s television series The Greatest American Hero as Cyler Johnson and as a member of a criminal gang in RoboCop.

== Early life ==
Goins attended high school in Le Roy, New York and college at University of Michigan and SUNY Brockport. He performed in college theater productions while a student at Michigan.

== Acting career ==
Apart from The Greatest American Hero, Goins has appeared on TV shows including Hill Street Blues, The White Shadow, Trapper John, M.D., Benson, Taxi, Diff'rent Strokes, Desperate Housewives, Buck Rogers in the 25th Century, Boy Meets World, The A-Team, Cold Case, ER, Seinfeld, Boston Legal and Agents of S.H.I.E.L.D..

Goins' best-known film role is that of Joe Cox, a member of Clarence Boddicker's gang in the 1987 science fiction movie RoboCop.

== Filmography ==
| Year | Title | Role | Notes |
|---|---|---|---|
| 1980 | Diff'rent Strokes (2 episodes) | Cameraman/Thomas (credited as Jesse Goins) | Episodes: “The Election” & “The Bank Job" |
| 1980 | White Mama | Intern | |
| 1981 | The Greatest American Hero | Cyler Johnson | |
| 1982 | Jekyll and Hyde... Together Again | Dutch | |
| 1982 | The Dukes of Hazzard | Don Purcell | Episode: A Little Game of Pool |
| 1983 | Second Thoughts | Security Guard | |
| 1983 | WarGames | Sergeant | |
| 1984 | Up the Creek | Brown | |
| 1987 | RoboCop | Joe Cox | |
| 1988 | The Presidio | MP Bygrave | |
| 1992 | Patriot Games | FBI Agent Shaw | |
| 1993 | RoboCop 3 | Joe Cox (archive footage) | Flashback sequence, uncredited |
| 1994 | Seinfeld | Cop | Episode: "The Hamptons" |
| 1994 | Ultraman: The Ultimate Hero | Potter | Episode: "A Father's Love" |
| 1995 | A Bucket of Blood | Art | |
| 1996 | Larger than Life | Airport Guard | |
| 1996 | Street Corner Justice | Troy | |
| 1996 | Suddenly | Ben | |
| 1997 | In the Company of Men | Bank patron | |
| 1998 | Soldier | Chester | |
| 1999 | Tuesdays with Morrie | Sports Fan #2 | TV film |
| 2001 | Echos of Enlightenment | Paul | |
| 2007 | American Zombie | Officer Hannigan | |
| 2009 | The Ugly Truth | Cliff | |
| 2010 | Once Fallen | Bookman | |
| 2017 | Deadly Expose | Captain Collins | |
