= Yumesaki Tunnel =

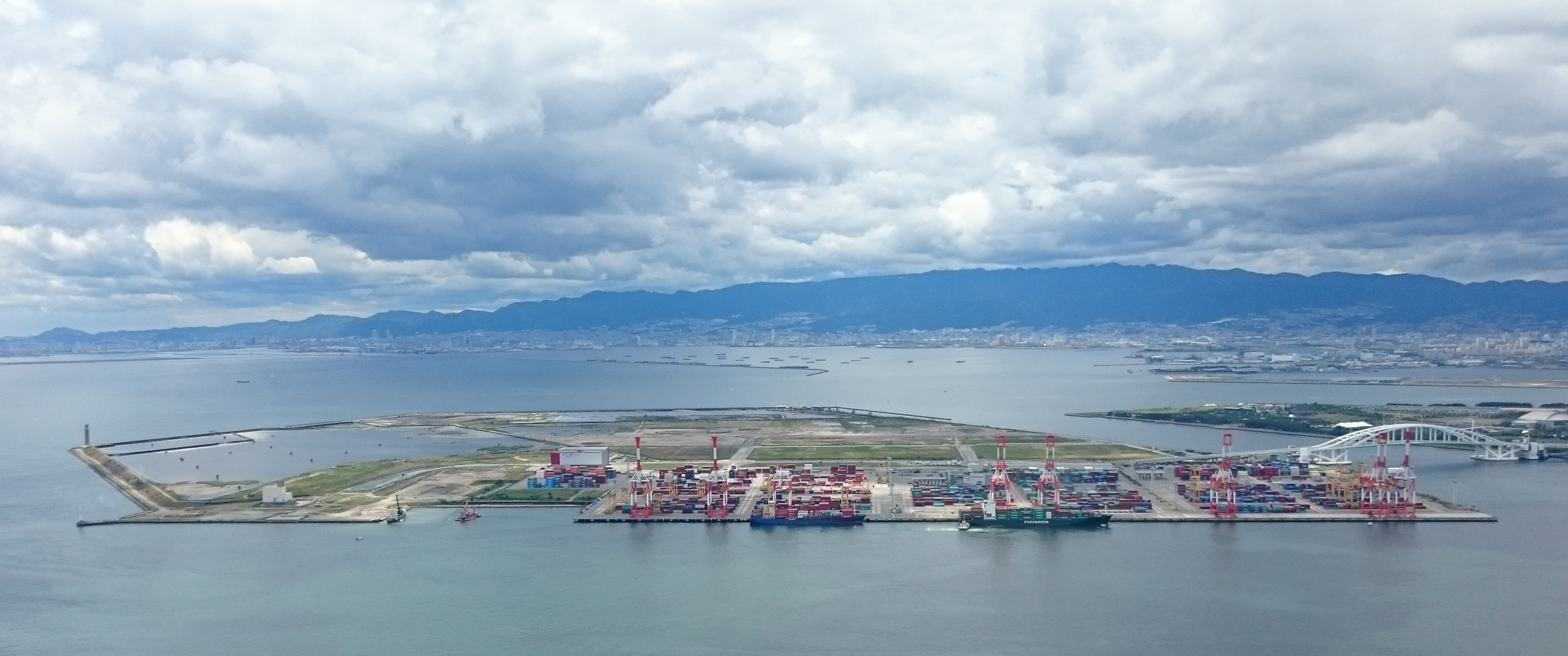
- Yumesaki Tunnel in Yumeshima island
- Interactive map of Yumesaki Tunnel

Overview
- Location: between Yumeshima island and Sakishima island, Osaka
- Coordinates: 34°38′32.0454″N 135°23′47.0574″E
- Status: active

Operation
- Opened: 2009
- Character: Passenger and Freight

Technical
- Line length: 2.138 km (1.328 mi)
- No. of tracks: 2

Yumesaki Tunnel (夢咲トンネル, ゆめさきトンネル) is a tunnel in Japan that runs from artificial island "Yumeshima" in the Osaka Hokko district of Konohana Ward, Osaka City to another artificial island "Sakishima" in the Osaka Nanko District of Suminoe Ward in Osaka with approximate length of 2.138 km. It was completed and opened in 2009.

== See also ==
- List of tunnels in Japan
- Seikan Tunnel Tappi Shakō Line
- Sakhalin–Hokkaido Tunnel
- Bohai Strait tunnel
