= Metropak =

Metropak was a Scottish post-punk band, active in Edinburgh, Scotland, in 1979 and 1980. Band members were Stephen Harrison (guitar and vocal, first two singles only), Robin Thistlethwaite (guitar and vocal), Murray Bruce (bass guitar), Toni McVittie (drums) and Helen Rutherford (keyboards). Metropak played many venues in and around Edinburgh. The band released three singles on the PAK Records label, which have remained sought-after objects. Renewed interest in the band and the music of that era in Scotland, resulted in two Metropak songs, "You’re a Rebel" and "Here’s Looking at You", being included on Messthetics No. 105: DIY 77-81 Scotland, an American compilation CD released in 2008.

In 2010, Close Up Records UK released a compilation CD by Metropak called The Singles Collection, comprising all material released originally on vinyl in 1979 and 1980.
