= Maishima =

Artificial island in Osaka, Japan

Native name: 舞洲
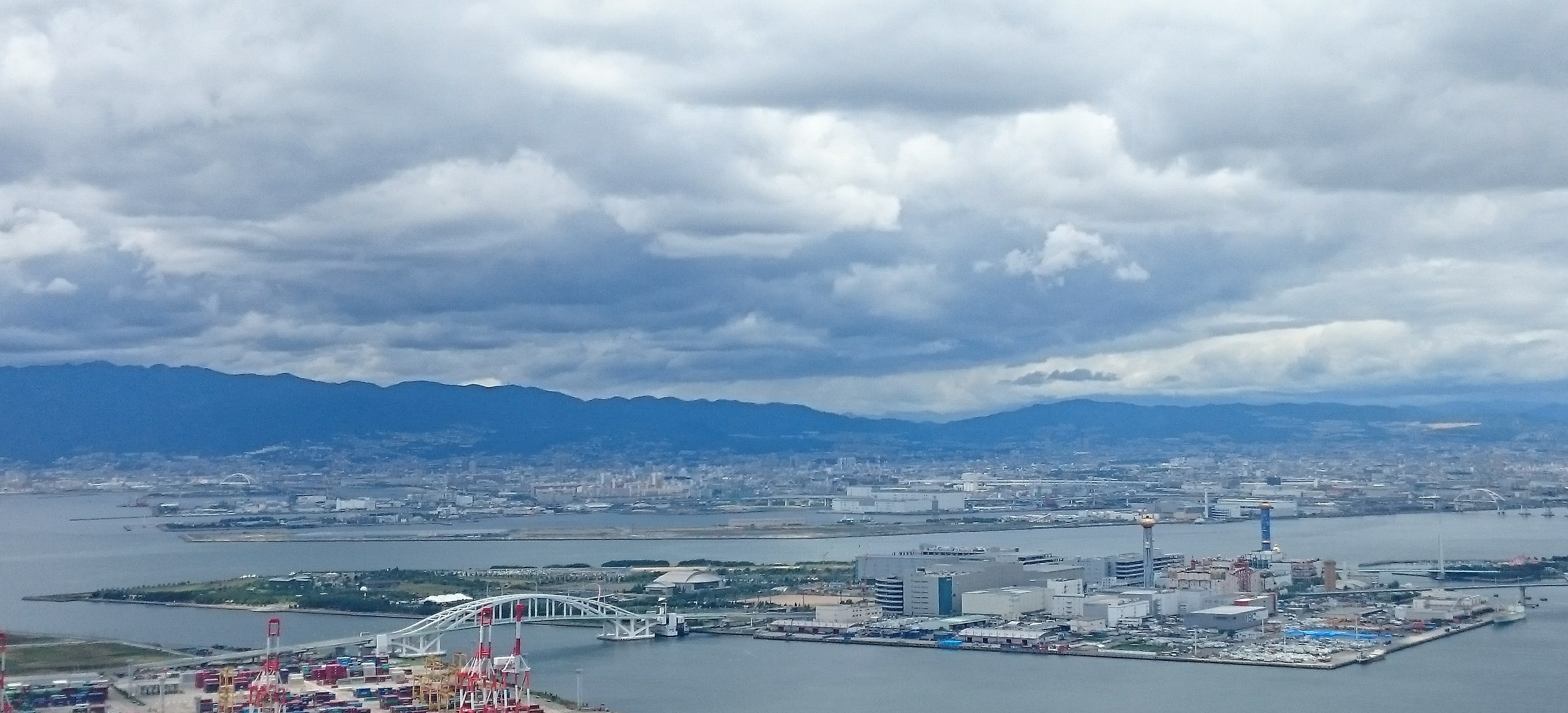
- Full view of Maishima (taken from Osaka Prefectural Government Sakishima Building)

- Location within Osaka Prefecture.

Geography
- Location: Osaka Bay
- Coordinates: 34°39′51.2″N 135°23′42.5″E

Administration
- Japan
- Ward: Konohana-ku
- City: Osaka
- Prefecture: Osaka

Maishima (舞洲) is an artificial island located in Konohana-ku, Osaka, Osaka Prefecture Japan. The area is about 220 hectares.

One of the three artificial island districts that was the subject of the "Technoport Osaka" plan formulated in 1988 with the aim of developing a new city center.

== Geography ==
Maishima is an artificial island located in Osaka Kohoku Port in the western part of Osaka. Administratively, it belongs to Konohana-ku, and two district names, Hokkoryokuchi and Hokkoshiratsu, are set. The island is connected to the outside of the island by three road bridges, which are connected to Tsuneyoshi by the Tsuneyoshi Bridge in the north, Hokuko by the Konohana Bridge in the east, and Yumeshima by the Yumemai Bridge in the south.

Maishima is positioned as a logistics/environmental zone on the east side and a sports/recreation zone on the west side.

== History ==
In July 1972, it was decided to approve a project to reclaim the water surface of this Hana Ward land as a waste treatment and landfill, and to create public land such as pier land, park green space, and revetment. The name of the reclaimed land, which is currently nicknamed "Maishima," is "North Kohoku District." In 1987, the "North Kohoku District" completed the acceptance of waste.

The development plan for the coastal area, which began to be considered in 1983 as a project to commemorate the 100th anniversary of the Osaka municipal organization (1989 is the 100th anniversary of the municipal organization), was formulated as the "Technoport Osaka" concept. In this concept, it was planned to develop cultural recreation facilities in the northern Kohoku district and achieve a scale of 10,000 employees and 22,000 daytime population in 2010.

In 1991, the nickname "Maishima" was established by open recruitment (Sakishima and Yumeshima are also named at the same time).

Since 1990, there has been a plan to make Maishima a "sports island" where sports facilities are concentrated, and there was also a plan to establish an artificial ski resort and golf course. Facilities were improved for the 52nd National Athletic Meet in 1997, and Maishima Baseball Stadium (softball baseball), Ookini Arena Maishima (basketball), and Maishima Stadium (hockey) became match venues.

Maishima was the main venue for the 2008 Summer Olympic Games Bid Plan (Osaka Olympic Games Plan), which has been underway since the end of the 1990s. However, at the 2001 IOC Session, the venue was decided to be Beijing and was rejected (selection of the venue for the 2008 Summer Olympics).

After the failure to attract the Olympics, the utilization of undeveloped land will be an issue. Starting with the professional soccer club Cerezo Osaka setting up a practice field, the professional baseball team Orix Buffaloes has set up a training base and a farm team base, and the professional basketball team Osaka Evessa also has a training base.
