= List of The Greatest American Hero episodes =

The American sci-fi-comedy television series The Greatest American Hero aired from March 18, 1981, to February 3, 1983, and starred William Katt, Robert Culp, and Connie Sellecca. It consists of 45 episodes in three seasons.

== Series overview ==
Season	Episodes	Originally released	
Season	Episodes	First released	Last released
1	9	March 18, 1981	May 13, 1981
2	22	November 4, 1981	April 28, 1982
3	14	October 29, 1982	February 3, 1983

== Episodes ==
=== Season 1 (1981) ===
No.	Title	Directed by	Written by	Original release date
1	"The Greatest American Hero"	Rod Holcomb	Stephen J. Cannell	March 18, 1981
2	"The Greatest American Hero"	Rod Holcomb	Stephen J. Cannell	March 18, 1981
Series pilot: Ralph Hinkley is a teacher of at-risk high school students. One day, he takes his class on a field trip to the California desert, where he meets FBI agent Bill Maxwell. The two are visited by extraterrestrials, who gift Ralph with a super suit and inform the men that they must work together to save the planet from destruction. Their first mission is to prevent an assassination attempt on the President. However, not only do Ralph and Bill struggle to overcome their extreme personal differences and integrate their new responsibilities with their everyday lives, but Ralph immediately loses the suit’s instruction book. Note: The pilot was originally shown as a two-hour movie and was the fourth most-viewed television program of the week. It was later split into two one-hour episodes for syndication.
3	"The Hit Car"	Rod Holcomb	Stephen J. Cannell	March 25, 1981
As Ralph’s class prepares to perform Shakespeare’s The Taming of the Shrew, Bill convinces Ralph to help with a case. The two must dodge professional killers while transporting a beautiful and flirtatious starlet to testify against her drug-dealing mobster ex-boyfriend, Johnny “the Dancer” Demonte.
4	"Here's Looking at You, Kid"	Robert C. Thompson	Juanita Bartlett	April 1, 1981
Someone has stolen a top-secret weapons targeting system from the U.S. government and Bill hopes to use the super suit to help solve the case. However, Ralph has stumbled onto the suit’s powers of invisibility and is having difficulty controlling them. To make matters worse, he is also scheduled to meet Pam's parents (June Lockhart, Bob Hastings) for the first time. Note: Two days before this episode aired, John Hinckley, Jr. attempted to assassinate U.S. President Ronald Reagan. Consequently, all references to Ralph's last name being Hinkley were overdubbed in this episode to “Hanley.” Subsequent first season episodes generally omitted mention of Ralph's last name. His original name, "Hinkley", was restored at the beginning of season 2.
5	"Saturday on Sunset Boulevard"	Rod Holcomb	Stephen J. Cannell	April 8, 1981
Bill flunks an FBI polygraph test on the basis of one question: "Has anything strange happened to you in the last six months?" Unable to tell the truth about the suit, this puts his future at the Bureau in jeopardy. As a result, Bill reluctantly recruits Ralph's students to help him track down a Russian defector with the hopes of trading him for a pardon.
6	"Reseda Rose"	Gabrielle Beaumont	Juanita Bartlett	April 15, 1981
Ralph and Pam’s weekend plans must take a backseat when Bill enlists Ralph to surveil people on the FBI’s watchlist. Their day is thrown further into disarray when Rhonda’s mother is kidnapped, and further investigation reveals a plot involving a Russian submarine and plans to steal U.S. military secrets.
7	"My Heroes Have Always Been Cowboys"	Arnold Laven	Stephen J. Cannell	April 29, 1981
Ralph is despondent after nearly wrecking a tour bus during a routine case with Bill and seriously considers giving up the suit. Meanwhile, Bill pleads for Ralph’s help after learning that a friend plans to hijack a group of diamond smugglers and flee the country. Special guest star John Hart.
8	"Fire Man"	Gabrielle Beaumont	Lee Sheldon	May 6, 1981
Ralph gets Tony a job repossessing cars, and one night Tony unknowingly takes a car filled with arson equipment. When he is wrongly accused of setting fires, Ralph, Bill and Pam must find the real arsonist while being harassed by other law enforcement agencies investigating the case.
9	"The Best Desk Scenario"	Robert C. Thompson	Juanita Bartlett	May 13, 1981
When Pam receives a junior partnership at her law firm and Ralph is promoted to temporary vice principal, Bill begins to worry about his mortality and number of recent mistakes. However, Pam’s excitement for her new job is tainted when she discovers that her boss is mixed up with the mob.

=== Season 2 (1981–82) ===
No. overall	No. in season	Title	Directed by	Written by	Original release date
10	1	"The Two-Hundred-Mile-an-Hour Fast Ball"	Georg Stanford Brown	Stephen J. Cannell	November 4, 1981
Crooks needing cash to swing an arms deal bet heavily on a baseball game and beat up the star of the team they bet against. Ralph joins the underdogs to make sure they win and the gamblers lose their money. Guest Markie Post.
11	2	"Operation Spoilsport"	Rod Holcomb	Frank Lupo	November 11, 1981
The aliens return and tell Ralph and Bill that World War III is imminent: a fail-safe system, which will launch an attack on the other side if the country's been decimated, has been activated. They have to stop it, but unfortunately, they discover someone on their side is behind the whole thing.
12	3	"Don't Mess Around With Jim"	Robert C. Thompson	Stephen J. Cannell	November 18, 1981
Ralph and Bill are kidnapped by a tycoon who fakes his own death . . . and seems to know more about the suit than they do. He then blackmails them into retrieving his will and prevent it from being misused by the president of his company.
13	4	"Hog Wild"	Ivan Dixon	Stephen J. Cannell	November 25, 1981
When a motorcycle gang learns about Ralph and the suit, they grab Bill and force Ralph to help them get back at the Sheriff who humiliated them.
14	5	"Classical Gas"	Bruce Kessler	Frank Lupo	December 2, 1981
Ralph and Pam help his students rehearse their rock band for a show, not realizing the promoter plans to release nerve gas into the audience.
15	6	"The Beast in the Black"	Arnold Laven	Juanita Bartlett	December 9, 1981
Ralph finds a window into the Fourth Dimension while scouting an old house. Bill gets possessed by a woman's spirit, and Ralph must return her through that window . . . but therein waits a vicious beast, against which the suit is powerless.
16	7	"The Lost Diablo"	Lawrence Doheny	Juanita Bartlett	December 16, 1981
Bill learns of a lost gold mine and tricks Ralph and the kids into helping him search for it; they are met with resistance from the local thieves.
17	8	"Plague"	Arnold Laven	Rudolph Borchert	January 6, 1982
Ralph and Bill have to save mankind from a deadly plague virus that a fanatical right-wing military group hopes to unleash on an unsuspecting world.
18	9	"Train of Thought"	Lawrence Doheny	Frank Lupo	January 13, 1982
Ralph is injured after a head-on collision with a train and suffers selective amnesia: he remembers everything BUT Bill, the suit . . . and a terrorist plot to release atomic waste into a small town.
19	10	"Now You See It"	Robert C. Thompson	Patrick Hasburgh	January 20, 1982
Ralph is able to see two hours into the future, at which time Pam's plane will crash.
20	11	"The Hand-Painted Thai"	Bruce Kessler	Stephen J. Cannell, Patrick Hasburgh & Frank Lupo	January 27, 1982
During the Vietnam War, four American POW pilots were brainwashed to respond to a code phrase by a Laotian colonel. Now in the present day, someone is using them to commit vengeful acts of sabotage. Bill and Ralph investigate, but Bill inadvertently falls under a hypnotic trance, leaving the heroics up to Ralph.
21	12	"Just Another Three-Ring Circus"	Chuck Bowman	Stephen J. Cannell	February 3, 1982
Ralph takes a job at the circus as a human cannonball while trying to help Bill bust a crime ring that involves a phony dating service.
22	13	"The Shock Will Kill You"	Rod Holcomb	Story by : Patrick Hasburgh; Teleplay by : Stephen J. Cannell and Frank Lupo	February 10, 1982
While rescuing a stricken space shuttle Ralph becomes hyper-magnetized, resulting his being attracted to all things metal. Meanwhile, a strange creature aboard the shuttle heads towards Los Angeles, electrocuting all who get in its way.
23	14	"A Chicken in Every Plot"	Rod Holcomb	Danny Lee Cole & J. Duncan Ray	February 17, 1982
Ralph, Pam and the kids fly to a Caribbean island to visit a friend of Bill's. When they arrive, they find Bill's friend murdered and the island racked by a voodoo-driven revolt against the government.
24	15	"The Devil and the Deep Blue Sea"	Sidney Hayers	Frank Lupo	February 24, 1982
Ralph and Bill hunt for the sea creature "Carrie" in the Bermuda Triangle, thinking that the monster may be responsible for all of the boats that disappear there. Instead, they uncover a stolen boat ring.
25	16	"It's All Downhill from Here"	Sidney Hayers	Patrick Hasburgh	March 3, 1982
While on a ski trip, Ralph witnesses the murder of an American Olympic team member, who had actually been receiving top-secret military information from a Russian defector. He must then protect him and his girlfriend from a KGB hit squad.
26	17	"Dreams"	Bruce Kessler	Stephen J. Cannell	March 17, 1982
An act of kindness backfires badly when Ralph uses the suit to help a co-worker with a personal project. This leads his other co-workers to take daring chances for their own shots at success. Soon, he must hustle to prevent them from ruining their lives, but also to save Bill from a vengeful, recently paroled killer.
27	18	"There's Just No Accounting . . ."	Ivan Dixon	Frank Lupo	March 24, 1982
Bill convinces the parents of a kidnap victim to pay the ransom, certain that Ralph can recover it when he saves their little girl. Alas, when he does so, Ralph finds himself being audited by an overzealous IRS agent who is convinced that he took the ransom money. Meanwhile, Ralph and Bill keep getting shot at by a mysterious adversary with no connection to the kidnapping.
28	19	"Good Samaritan"	Bruce Kessler	Rudolph Borchert	March 31, 1982
Ralph, tired of simply pursuing criminals, decides that he wants to help people. He starts by helping a man who is being forced out of his home.
29	20	"Captain Bellybuster and the Speed Factory"	Arnold Laven	Stephen J. Cannell & Frank Lupo	April 7, 1982
An actor (Chuck McCann) who plays a superhero mascot in commercials for a hamburger joint has just learned that the restaurant is a front for an amphetamines ring. Realizing that could get him killed, he calls on a real superhero for help: Ralph.
30	21	"Who's Woo in America"	Bob Bender	Patrick Hasburgh	April 14, 1982
Ralph's mother (William Katt's real-life mother, Barbara Hale) comes for a visit, and announces that she is engaged to be married to Philip Kabala, a much younger man. Kabala has a shady background, though, and a bunch of thugs mistake Ralph for the fiancé.
31	22	"Lilacs, Mr. Maxwell"	Robert Culp	Robert Culp	April 28, 1982
Ralph breaks into the FBI archives and helps Bill solve a number of cold cases. As a result, Bill becomes a hero and a target for a beautiful KGB assassin. This was the first of the two episodes that Robert Culp wrote and directed.

=== Season 3 (1982–83) ===
No. overall	No. in season	Title	Directed by	Written by	Original release date
32	1	"Divorce, Venusian Style"	Ivan Dixon	Patrick Hasburgh	October 29, 1982
After an argument with Bill, Ralph quits the hero business, leaves Bill with his super-suit and is immediately shot. To save his life, the Green Guys are forced to reveal themselves, bring Bill and Ralph aboard and give them a new Instruction Book, as well as the purpose for having chosen them.
33	2	"The Price Is Right"	Ivan Dixon	Stephen J. Cannell	November 5, 1982
While attending a high-school reunion, Ralph discovers that the wife of a famous pro football player is being held hostage to ensure her husband will throw the big game.
34	3	"This Is the One the Suit Was Meant For"	Ivan Dixon	Babs Greyhosky	November 12, 1982
Pam is ready to break up with Ralph because he always puts the suit first. Bill gives them tickets to a tropical island to keep them together. Once there, they discover Bill's true plan: to use the suit to find a missing experimental aircraft.
35	4	"The Resurrection of Carlini"	Arnold Laven	Frank Lupo	November 19, 1982
A magician who was killed performing his greatest trick seemingly returns from the grave to murder his three rivals. Ralph must use his suit to out-trick the would-be killer.
36	5	"The Newlywed Game"	Chuck Bowman	Babs Greyhosky	January 6, 1983
On the way to Ralph's bachelor party, he and Bill are kidnapped and Ralph is persuaded to fly a mission for the president.
37	6	"Heaven Is in Your Genes"	Christian I. Nyby II	Patrick Hasburgh	January 13, 1983
Ralph must rescue Bill from kidnapping by a crazed scientist who wants to experiment on him to find out what makes him such a successful agent. Andre the Giant guest stars.
38	7	"Live at Eleven"	Arnold Laven	Babs Greyhosky	January 20, 1983
While foiling a plutonium robbery, Ralph gets exposed to radiation and discovers a new ability: he can mentally influence people. He and Bill must discover who is behind the robbery attempt and find the connection to a TV news anchor who plans to run for president.
39	8	"Space Ranger"	Ivan Dixon	Rudolph Borchert	January 27, 1983
Ralph finds that his newest student is wanted by the CIA and KGB after tapping into a Soviet satellite.
40	9	"Thirty Seconds Over Little Tokyo"	Arnold Laven	Danny Lee Cole & J. Duncan Ray	February 3, 1983
Ralph and Bill find themselves trying to protect a Japanese inventor after a terrorist tries to kidnap him and steal his invention: a powerful laser weapon.
41	10	"Wizards and Warlocks"	Bruce Kessler	Shel Willens	N/A
Bill is called upon to find a missing Middle Eastern prince, but it turns out that the prince is playing Wizards & Warlocks, a game in which someone gives him a task to do. Ralph and Bill try to unravel the mystery of the game and find the prince before the potential kidnappers do.
42	11	"It's Only Rock and Roll"	Christian I. Nyby II	Babs Greyhosky	N/A
After receiving a bomb threat, Bill is put in charge of protecting Dak Hampton, the lead singer of a rock and roll group.
43	12	"Desperado"	Christopher Nelson	Stephen J. Cannell & Frank Lupo	N/A
Ralph and Pam come across some horse rustlers who steal a herd of wild mustangs, but Ralph stops them from capturing the prize stallion, Desperado.
44	13	"Vanity, Says the Preacher"	Robert Culp	Robert Culp	N/A
Bill accepts an invitation to be honored as Man of the Year by a Latin American country where, years before, he was instrumental in helping them establish a democratic government. This time, however, Ralph suspects treachery and refuses to intervene. The Green Guys return and warn Bill that Ralph was right. This was the second of the two episodes that Robert Culp wrote and directed.
45	14	"The Greatest American Heroine"	Tony Mordente	Babs Greyhosky	N/A
The aliens tell Ralph to find a suitable replacement for himself when his secret identity is revealed to the world. Much to Bill's disgust he selects a woman. Although this episode was created as the pilot to start a new series, with Mary Ellen Stuart as Holly Hathaway in the lead role, the spin-off was ultimately scrapped.

== U.S. television ratings ==
Season	Episodes	Start date	End date	Nielsen rank	Nielsen rating
1980-81	9	March 18, 1981	September 3, 1981	N/A	N/A
1981-82	22	November 4, 1981	April 28, 1982	44	N/A
1982-83	14	October 29, 1982	February 3, 1983	92	N/A

== Home releases ==
At present, the following DVD sets of this series have been released.

DVD set	Episodes	Company	Release date
The Greatest American Hero: Season 1	9	Starz/Anchor Bay	February 15, 2005
The Greatest American Hero: Season 2	22	Starz/Anchor Bay	April 5, 2005
The Greatest American Hero: Season 3	13	Starz/Anchor Bay	August 2, 2005
The Greatest American Hero: Deluxe Collector's Tin	44	Starz/Anchor Bay	October 3, 2006
The Greatest American Hero: The Complete Series	43	Mill Creek Entertainment	May 18, 2010
The Greatest American Hero: Season 1	9	Mill Creek Entertainment	May 18, 2010
The Greatest American Hero: Season 2	22	Mill Creek Entertainment	October 12, 2010
