= Toronto bid for the 2008 Summer Olympics =

Unsuccessful bid for 2008 Summer Olympics

Bids for the 2008 Summer Olympics and Paralympics
Overview
- Games of the XXIX Olympiad; XIII Paralympic Games
- Winner: Beijing; Runner-up: Toronto; Shortlist: Paris · Istanbul · Osaka

Details
- City: Toronto, Ontario, Canada
- NOC: Canadian Olympic Committee (COC)

Previous Games hosted
- None; Previously bid for 1996 Summer Olympics

Decision
- Result: Runner-up (22 votes)

Toronto 2008 was one of the five short-listed bids for the 2008 Games, presented by the city of Toronto, Ontario, Canada.

Toronto received permission to represent Canada from the Canadian Olympic Association (chosen over Vancouver). On January 16, 2000, the bid committee received a financial support guarantee from the province of Ontario, and it was sent to the IOC along with the bid book.

Toronto's bid was led by Toronto citizen John Bitove, a businessman and founder of the Toronto Raptors of the NBA. The bid focused the Olympic events on a compact area along the city's Lake Ontario waterfront. The Olympic village would have been built on reclaimed industrial areas, and the city's plans called for construction of a new rapid transit network connecting the venues.

The evaluation committee spoke highly of Toronto's bid. In particular, they noted the city's financial plan, the concentration of athletes into a central Olympic area, and existing transportation infrastructure as positives. The Evaluation Report stated that

the compact sports concept based on a unique site adjacent to the city centre with good transport links and a legacy to sport make the bid very attractive. The major challenge is the capacity of the combined private sector and government alliance to deliver the waterfront sports venues and Village developments (...) However, the Commission is confident that this could be achieved and that Toronto would stage an excellent Games.

By June 2001, Toronto and Beijing were in close competition for selection as the host city. That month, the mayor of Toronto, Mel Lastman, made a derogatory remark about the city of Mombasa, Kenya, just before a trip to that country to lobby IOC officials. The comment provoked controversy around the world, and particular concern among African delegates to the IOC. Press reports suggested that the comments may have influenced the decision of the IOC.

It was the second time that Toronto had lost a bid to host a Summer Olympics, as they bid for the 1996 Games, but lost to Atlanta. But two years later, the Canadian city of Vancouver bid to host the 2010 Winter Olympics and won.

== Bid details ==
According to organisers, 70% of the venues needed to host the Olympics in Toronto had already been built. The proposed venues concept comprised:

=== Competition venues ===
Venue	Location	Olympic sport(s)	Paralympic sport(s)
Olympic Waterfront Cluster
Air Canada Centre	Toronto	basketball	wheelchair basketball
Ashbridge's Bay Beach	Toronto	beach volleyball	
Toronto Downtown	Toronto	cycling (road race, individual time trial)	cycling (road race, individual time trial)
Exhibition Place Aquatic Centre	Toronto	aquatics (waterpolo), modern pentathlon	
Metro Toronto Convention Centre	Toronto	fencing, judo	fencing
Molson Canadian Amphitheatre	Toronto	weightlifting	powerlifting
National Tennis Centre	Toronto	tennis	tennis
National Trade Centre	Toronto	badminton, gymnastics (artistic, rhythmic, trampoline), table tennis, taekwondo, modern penthathlon	boccia, judo, rugby, table tennis
Olympic Aquatic Centre	Toronto	aquatics (diving, synchronized swimming, swimming)	aquatics (swimming)
Olympic Archery Centre	Toronto	archery	archery
Olympic Modern Pentathlon Equestrian Centre	Toronto	modern pentathlon	equestrian
Olympic Sailing Marina	Toronto	sailing	sailing
Olympic Shooting Centre	Toronto	shooting (rifle, pistol)	shooting
Olympic Stadium	Toronto	athletics, football (final)	athletics
Olympic Velodrome and Multisport Centre	Toronto	cycling (track, road race, individual time trial), wrestling	cycling (track, individual time trial)
Richmond Green	Richmond Hill	baseball	
Rogers Centre	Toronto	baseball, softball	
Ricoh Coliseum	Toronto	handball	volleyball (standing)
Toronto Olympic Regatta Centre	Toronto	canoe (sprint, slalom), rowing	
World Cup Triathlon Course	Toronto	triathlon	
York University Arena	Toronto		basketball (intellectual disability), goalball, volleyball (sitting)
Other venues
Brampton Centre for Sports and Entertainment	Brampton	basketball	
Copps Coliseum	Hamilton	boxing	
Durham College	Oshawa	softball	
Frank Clair Stadium	Ottawa	football (group matches)	
Hardwood Hills	Oro-Medonte	cycling (mountain bike)	
Hershey Centre	Mississauga	volleyball (indoor)	wheelchair basketball, volleyball (standing)
Ivor Wynne Stadium	Hamilton	football (group matches)	
Caledon Equestrian Park	Palgrave, Ontario	equestrian	
Oshawa Skeet and Gun Club	Oshawa	shooting (trap and skeet)	
Vaughan Grove Sports Park	Vaughan	football (group matches)	
