= Look at You Now =

Look at You Now may refer to:

- Look at You Now (album), a 2023 album by the Flower Kings
- "Look at You Now", a song by Blue Ash
- "Look at You Now", a song by Buzzcocks on their 2006 album Flat-Pack Philosophy
- "Look at You Now", a song by Catie Curtis on her 1999 album A Crash Course in Roses
- "Look at You Now", a song by Noel MacNeal and Tyler Bunch in Bear in the Big Blue House
- "Look at You Now", a 2004 song by Ciccone
- "Look at You Now", a song by E.M.D. on their 2008 album A State of Mind
- "Look at You Now", a song by Golden Smog on their 2007 album Blood on the Slacks
- "Look at You Now", a song by Hardline on their 2012 album Danger Zone
- "Look at You Now", a song by Ray Toro on his 2016 album Remember the Laughter
- "Look at You Now", a song by Simply Red on their 1985 album Picture Book
- "Look at You Now", a song by Yngwie Malmsteen on his 2010 album Relentless
