= CN Railway Police building, Toronto =

Heritage building in Ontario, Canada

Canadian National Railway Police building
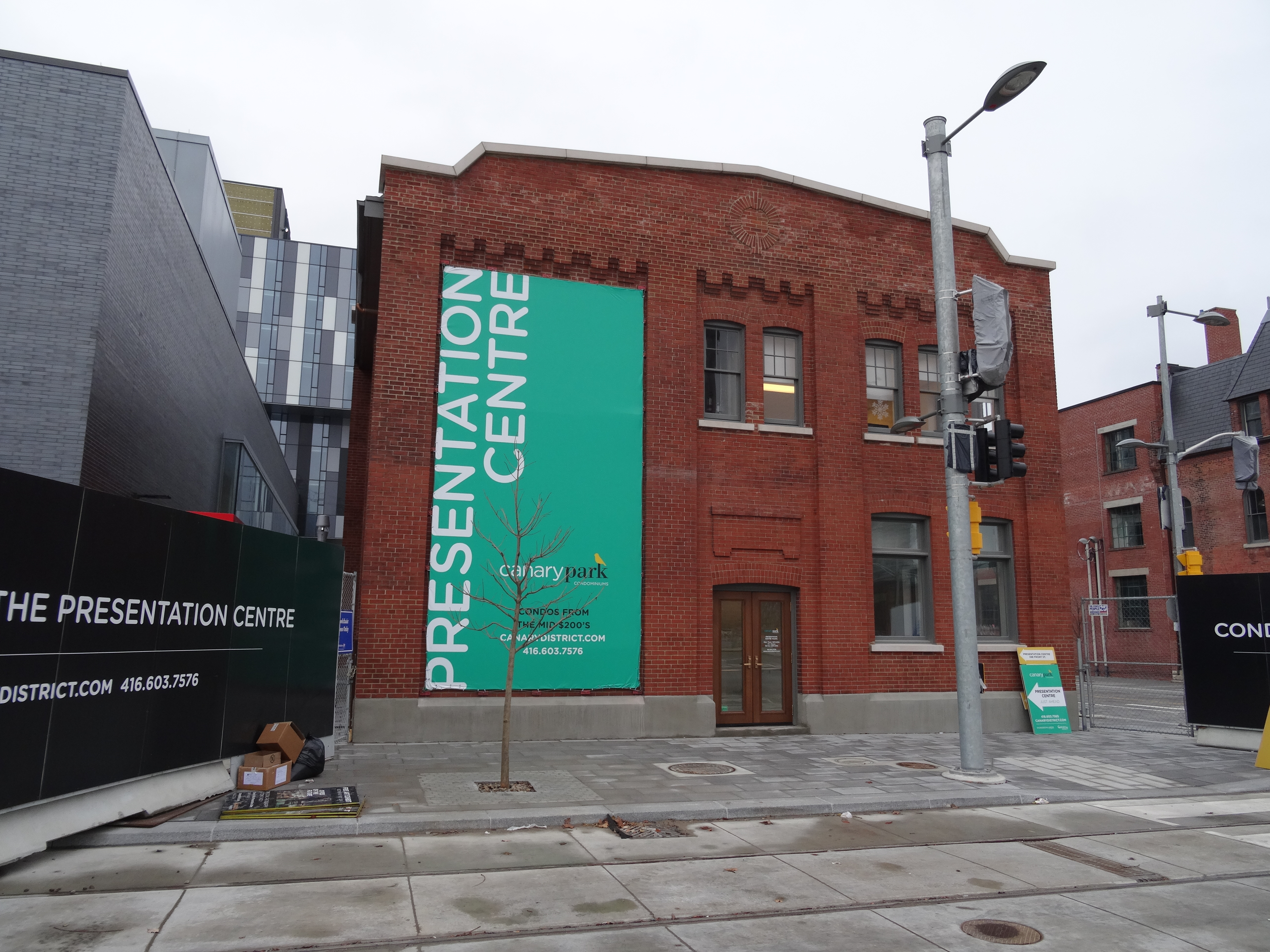
- In 2014 the building served as a sales office and presentation centre for the Canary District
- Interactive map of the Canadian National Railway Police building area
- Alternative names: Canadian National Railways Office Building; CN Police building

General information
- Location: 453 Cherry Street, Toronto, Canada
- Coordinates: 43°39′10″N 79°21′28″W
- Completed: 1923

The Canadian National Railway Police Building, also known as the Canadian National Railways Office Building, is a 1923 heritage building in Toronto, Ontario, Canada. It is located at the corner of Front Street and Cherry Street in the West Don Lands neighbourhood. The building served as the Toronto headquarters for the Canadian National Railways (CNR) police. It is one of two preserved buildings on Cherry Street that weren't demolished to make way for a new housing development, the other being the Cherry Street Hotel, across the street on the southeast corner. On April 14, 2005, the City of Toronto Council approved the listing of the property on the City of Toronto Heritage Property Inventory.

The building is in the West Don Lands redevelopment, which hosted the 2015 Pan American Games Athletes' Village and is currently under development. The area was initially cleared for the "Ataratiri" urban renewal project in the 1990s that failed. Several buildings such as the Railway Police Building, were identified as suitable for reuse and kept. As part of the bid for the 2015 Pan American Games, Toronto promised to rebuild the area, using apartment towers for the Athletes' Village, which would then be converted to condominiums. The area's condominium towers are slated to become the Canary District development, and in 2014, the Railway Police Building hosted the Canary District sales and presentation office.

== History ==
The building was built in 1923 by Canadian National Railways (CNR) after the Government of Canada merged five railway companies into CNR. The building was used as office space and then used by the Canadian National Police Service. To the east of the building was attached a freight yard transfer facility with doors along Front Street. The freight yard tracks themselves were taken up in 1970. The building has since been used as a location for film shoots as a 1920s vintage building.

As part of the West Don Lands redevelopment, the building was selected to be kept as a heritage building. For the 2015 Pan American Games, two buildings were built next to the building, a YMCA and a college residence. Both buildings were used as accommodations during the 2015 Games.

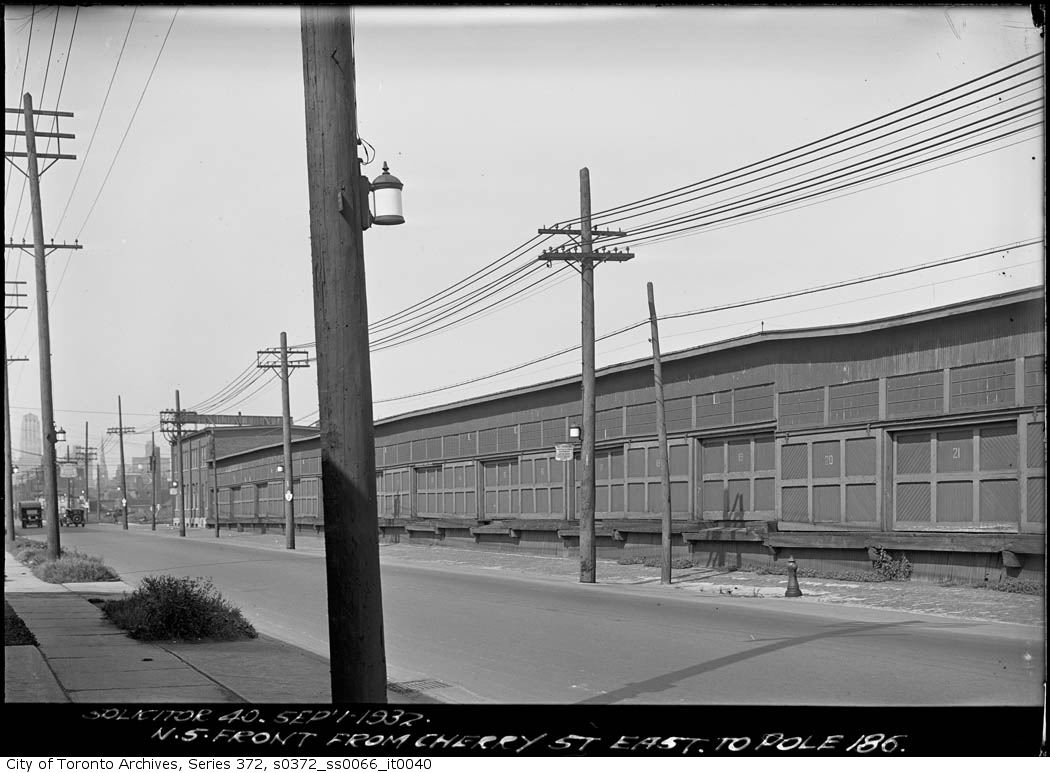
North side of Front Street in 1932, looking west along the CNR freight yard with the office building at the far end, on the corner of Cherry Street
