= Cherry Street Hotel =

Heritage building in Toronto, Ontario, Canada

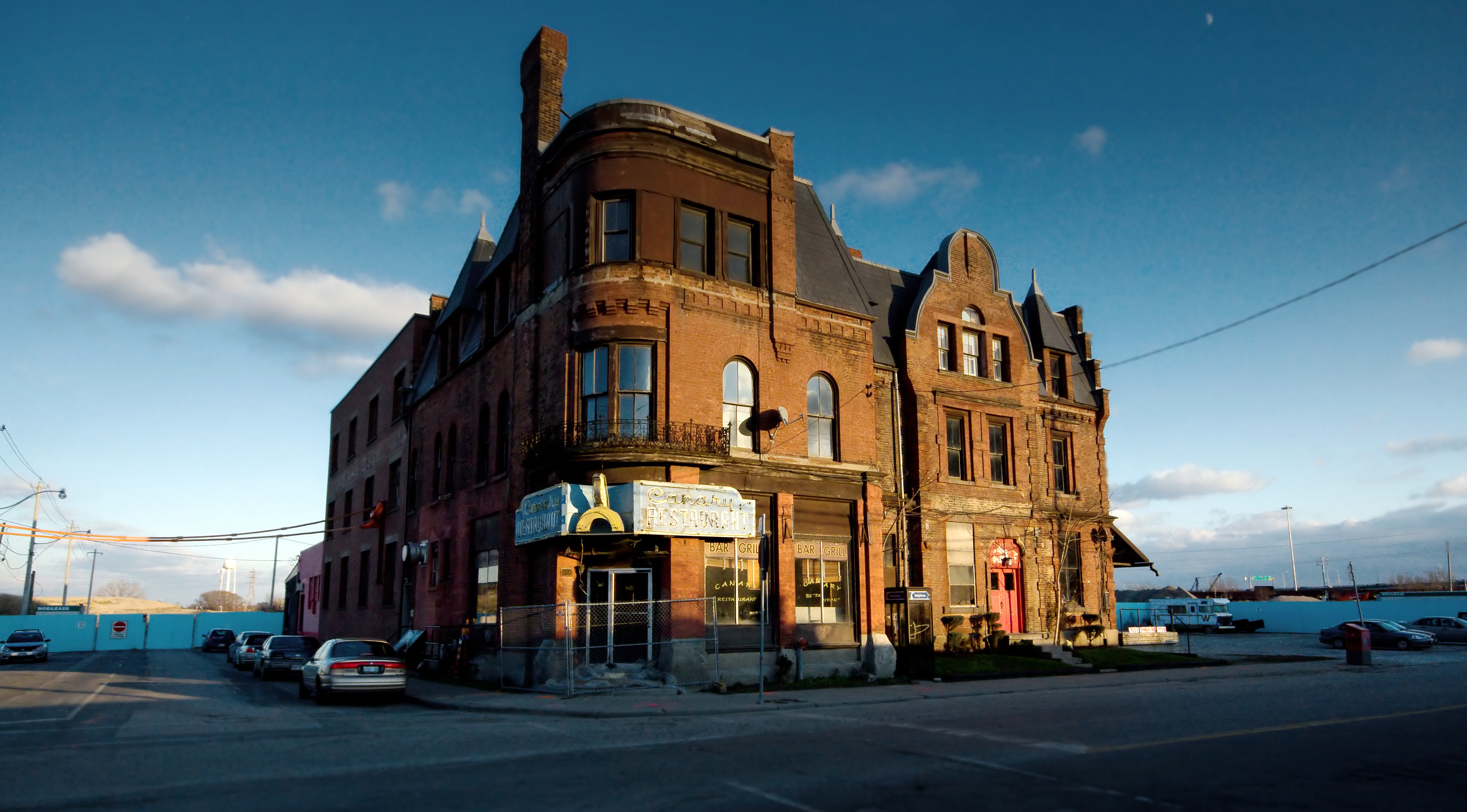
- The building awaiting redevelopment, in 2008
- Interactive map of the Cherry Street Hotel area
- Former names: Palace Street School; D'Arcy Hotel; Eastern Star Hotel

General information
- Location: 425/441 Cherry Street, Toronto, Ontario, Canada
- Coordinates: 43°39′09″N 79°21′27″W
- Opened: 1859

Design and construction
- Architect: Joseph Sheard

The Cherry Street Hotel is an 1859 heritage building in Toronto, Ontario, Canada. It is located on the southeast corner of Front Street and Cherry Street, in the West Don Lands neighbourhood. The structure was originally the Palace Street School, which closed in 1887. The building was converted into a hotel, and later became an industrial building housing small industry. In the 1960s, the Canary Restaurant opened. The building became a type of incubator, renting small spaces for artists and small businesses. The restaurant closed after the area around the building was demolished for the new West Don Lands community. The building has been integrated into the new community and its facade retained and restored. Its next use has not been announced.

== History ==
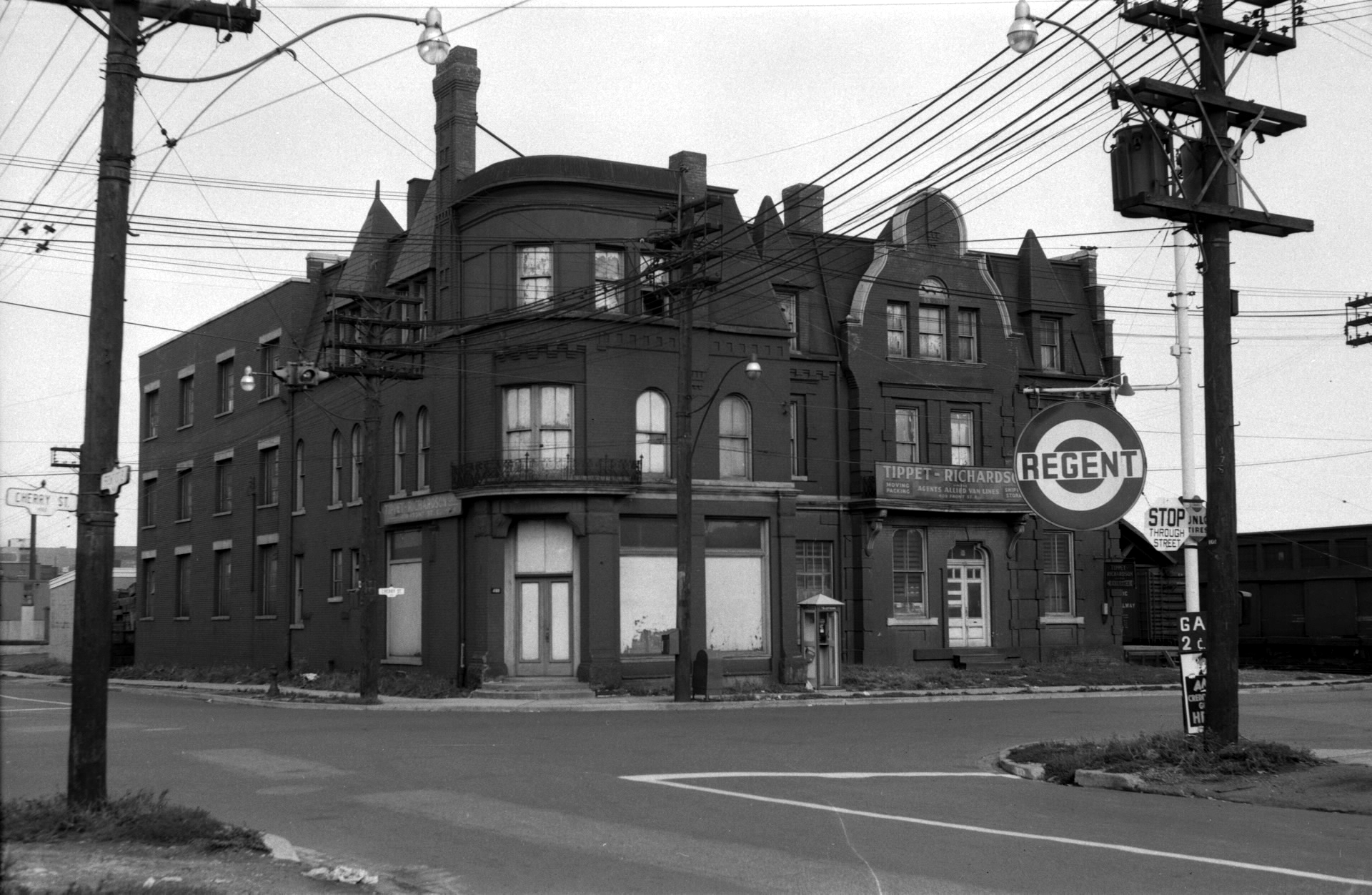
The building being used by the Tippet-Richardson moving company

The Palace Street School opened in 1859. The school was designed by Joseph Sheard who later became Mayor of Toronto. The original name of Front Street in this area was Palace Street, giving the school its name. At the time, the area was a residential area. The building was built to serve an increasing number of residents in the area. It was a free school of the Toronto Board of Education. The school had two rooms, each holding 80-90 students; one for boys and one for girls. In 1882, when the structure was still a school, Georgina Riches was appointed its principal, stirring controversy. According to Nancy Kiefer, writing in the Dictionary of Canadian Biography, this controversy is often attributed to Riches being Toronto's first female principal to be paid the same as a man. Kiefer, however, wrote that some of the opposition came from other female teachers, who had more experience, or who had the first class teaching certificate Reid lacked. The school was closed in 1887, its students transferring to a school on nearby Sackville Street, where Riches was also transferred.

The building was sold to Robert Irvine, who remodelled it as a 40-room hotel known as the Irvine House. It was later sold to Mr. Darcy, who renamed it the Cherry Street Hotel. In 1904, the hotel was renamed the Eastern Star Hotel. By 1910, the hotel had failed, and it was vacant from 1910 until 1922. It was taken over for industrial purposes by the Thomas Davidson Manufacturing Company, maker of enamel ware and Antipitzky Metal Company. An addition was built on the east side of the building and used for industrial and warehouse purposes, including the operation of General Steel Ware. Later, Tippet & Richardson operated out of the building.

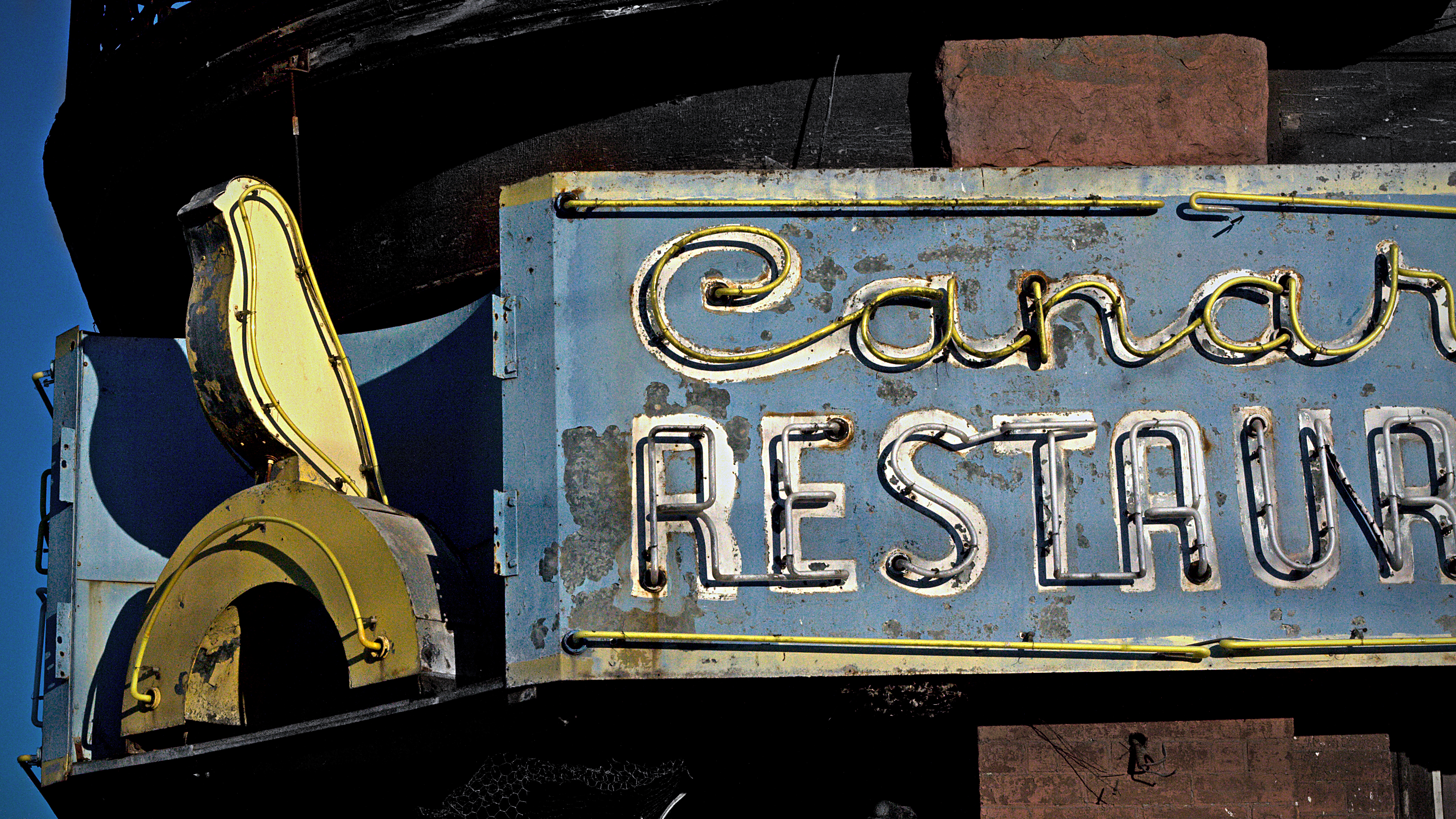
The neon sign for the old Canary Restaurant.

In 1965, the Canary Restaurant relocated here from its original location at Dundas Street and University Avenue. Known as the Canary Grill, the restaurant was operated by the Vlahos family and it retained its 1960s era decor. Its preserved decor was used for location shots for films set in that era. The restaurant rented studio apartments to artists and spaces for small business. The restaurant was likely located in the former tavern of the hotel. The building was designated as a heritage structure on August 18, 1976. The restaurant closed in 2007, unable to survive the decline in business due to the demolition of the area. The interior was gutted, the signage removed and the brickwork and facades restored.

== Canary District ==
To the east, the former industrial site of the Maple Leaf Mills pork processing plant lay vacant after its closure. The Government of Ontario started the Ataratiri redevelopment plan in the 1980s to convert the brownfield site and proceeded to demolish many of the buildings nearby. The hotel building was bought by the Government of Ontario and plans were made to convert it into a community centre. However, the ballooning cost of the project and a downturn in the real estate market led the Ontario government to cancel the project. To the south, the nearby Gooderham and Worts distillery complex closed in 1990, but it was repurposed as the Distillery District pedestrian district of shops, restaurants and a brewery (Mill Street Brewery) in the old buildings in the early 2000s.

In 2001, the new Waterfront Toronto agency was established, and one of the projects to be undertaken was to redevelop the Ataratiri site and the surrounding properties as part of a general waterfront revitalization. As part of the new plan for the "West Don Lands", the structure, and the CN Railway Police building across the street were preserved and restored when almost all the other buildings east of Cherry Street were demolished. In 2013, construction began on the residential condominiums buildings, larger and taller buildings, that dwarf the hotel. Those buildings served as the 2015 Pan American Games Athletes' Village. After the games, the buildings became private residences, the "Canary District" development, named after the restaurant. Several other condominiums have been and will be developed.
