= 514 Cherry =

Former streetcar route in Toronto, Canada (closed 2018)

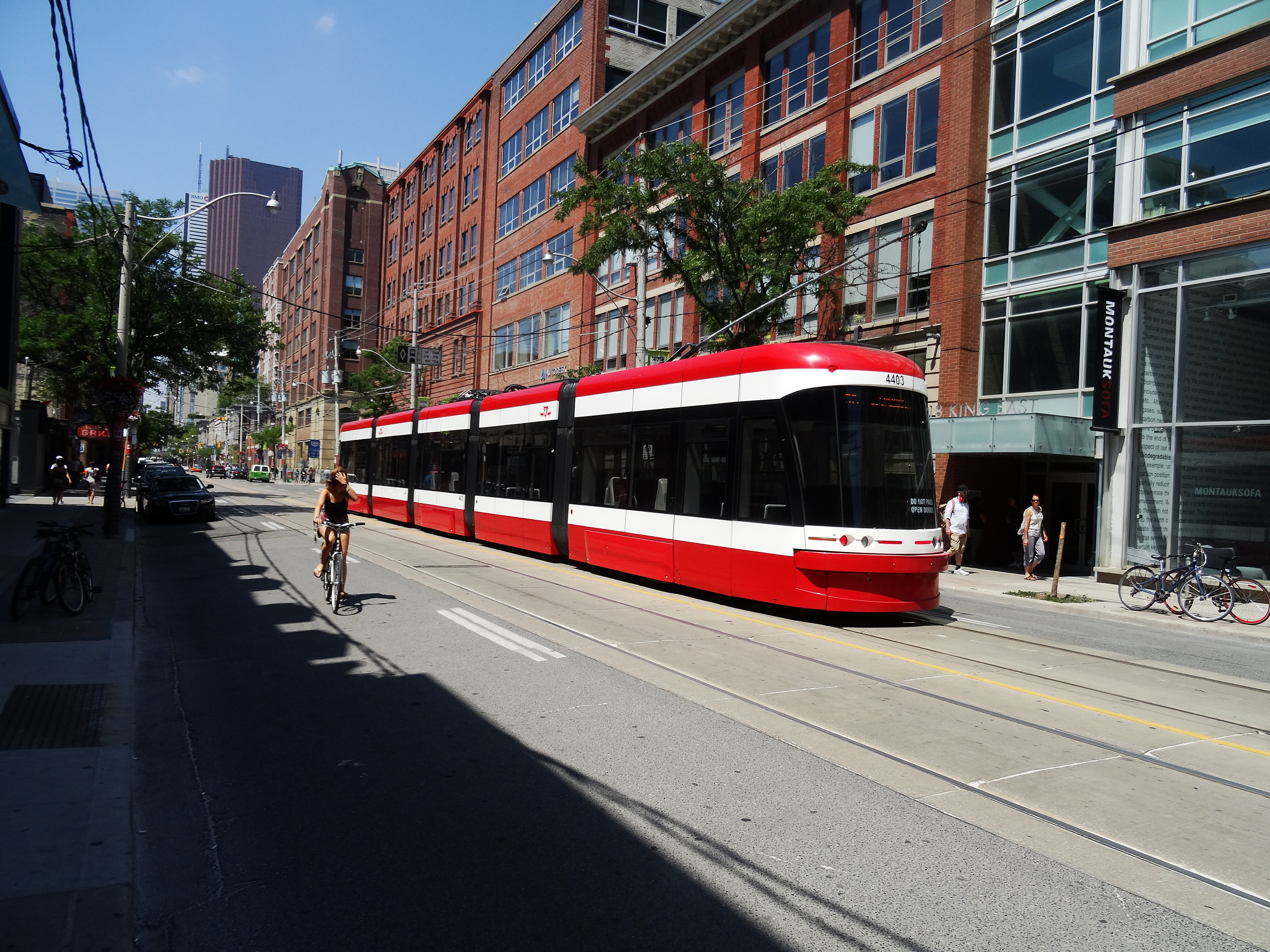

Overview
- Locale: Toronto, Ontario
- Termini: Dufferin Gate Loop (west); Distillery Loop (east)
- Stations: St. Andrew; King

Service
- Type: Streetcar route
- System: Toronto streetcar system
- Operator: Toronto Transit Commission
- Depot(s): Leslie Barns, Roncesvalles, Russell
- Rolling stock: Flexity Outlook

History
- Opened: June 19, 2016
- Closed: October 7, 2018

Technical
- Line length: 7.0 km (4.35 mi)
- Track gauge: 4 ft 10 7/8 in (1,495 mm)
- Electrification: 600 V DC overhead

The 514 Cherry was a streetcar route of the Toronto streetcar system in Toronto, Ontario, Canada, that operated from June 19, 2016, until October 7, 2018. The 514 operated through the financial district and downtown Toronto between Dufferin Gate Loop and the Distillery Loop. It used to supplement with the 504 King service along King Street, specifically to the dense residential areas in Liberty Village, the Canary District and the Distillery District. The City of Toronto's "King Street Visioning Study" proposed a transit and pedestrian corridor through which this route would operate.

The 514 Cherry route was replaced by two overlapping branches of the 504 King route, one (504A) serving the Distillery District, and the other (504B) serving Dufferin Gate at Exhibition Place.

== History ==
In November 2015, as part of a proposal to revise service in the areas of Cherry Street and Queens Quay East, the TTC proposed a new 514 streetcar route that would run from the Distillery streetcar loop on Cherry Street via King Street to the Dufferin Gate Loop. It was mainly to increase capacity to conveniently serve the growing ridership along the 504 King corridor, and accessibility concerns. It was also proposed to run all day, everyday, while maintaining 504 King streetcar service. Transit congestion had become so bad that Uber launched a rush-hour service for the corridor in December 2015.

Service initiatives in the Preliminary 2016 TTC Operating Budget called for dedicated resources to implement a new service at an operating cost in 2016 of $0.8 million and $2.1 million annually thereafter. No additional funding was provided in the 2016 budget. The TTC proposed no change in operating costs to operate route 514 as it will reallocate existing service along the 504 King streetcar route.

On March 23, 2016, the TTC approved the new route, and service began on June 19, 2016. This coincided with the conversion of the 2015 Pan American Games Athletes' Village to apartments and the opening of a George Brown College student residence.

Effective October 7, 2018, the 514 Cherry route was discontinued and was replaced by the 504 King route which was split into two overlapping routes, one of which (504A) serves the Distillery District, and the other (504B) serves Dufferin Gate at Exhibition Place.

== Route ==
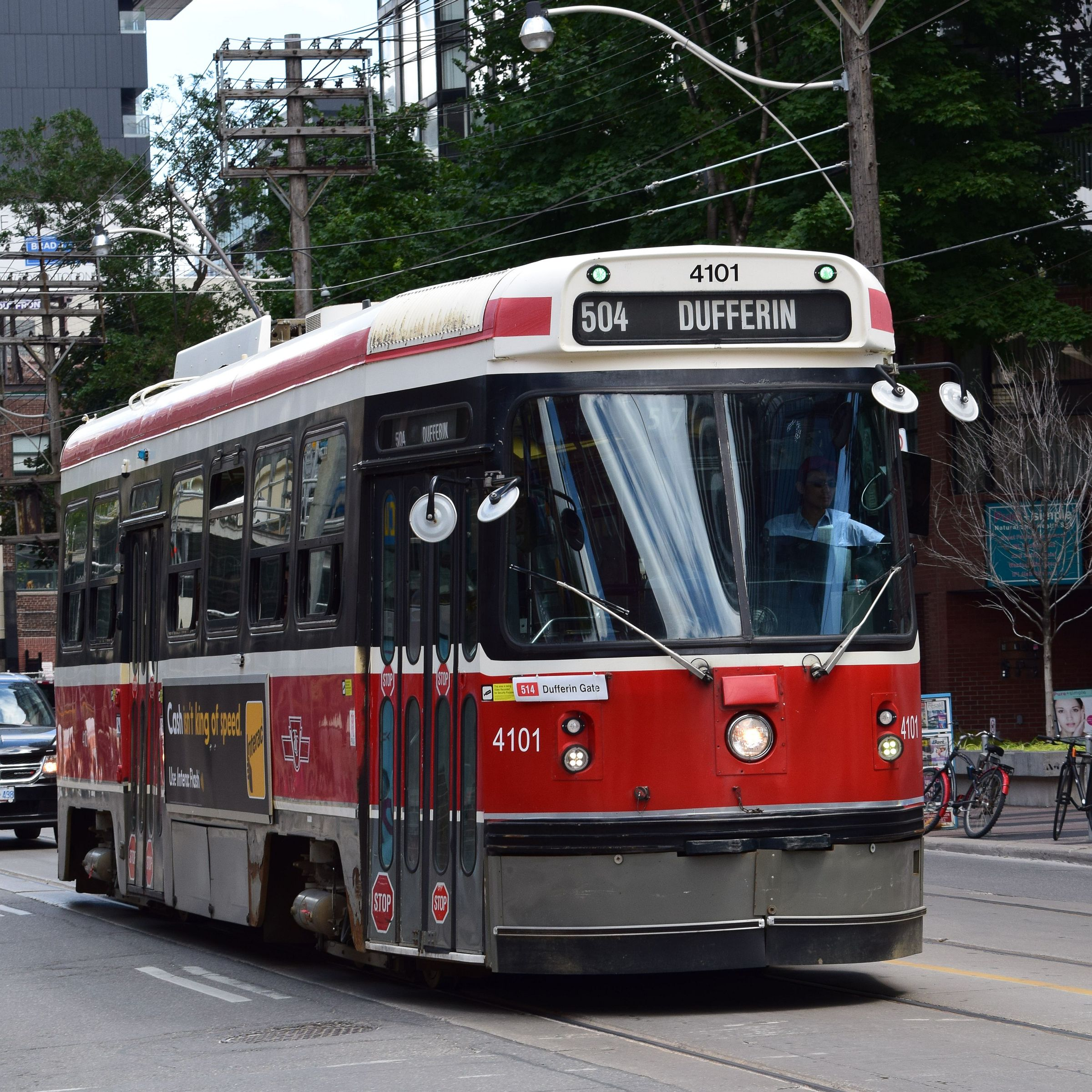
Westbound displays "504 Dufferin" with additional card showing that it is actually "514 Dufferin Gate"

On March 23, 2016, James Bow, writing in Transit Toronto, reprinted several maps, showing earlier proposed alignments. An alignment under consideration in 2008 had the 514's western terminus at Spadina Avenue, had it briefly turn south at Parliament, where it would turn east on Front Street, to Cherry. But instead of terminating at the railway embankment, the route tunneled through the embankment, crossed the Keating Channel, and turned east on Commissioners Street, terminating at Commissioners and Leslie.

Eastbound cars started their trips in Dufferin Gate Loop, then proceeded north along Dufferin Street to King Street, then turned east and proceeded along King through downtown to Sumach Street where they turned south to Distillery Loop on Cherry Street south of Mill Street. Westbound cars started their trips at Distillery Loop, then proceeded north along Cherry and Sumach Streets to King Street where they turned west. The cars proceeded along King through downtown to Dufferin Street where they went south and looped by way of Springhurst Avenue and Fort Rouille Street to end their trips at Dufferin Gate Loop.

Because the overhead route number and destination roll signs on the TTC's older CLRV streetcars were not available for this route, they often used blank signs, but sometimes they used signs supplemented from the 504 King streetcar line such as, "504 Dufferin" for cars heading westbound to Dufferin Gate Loop and "504 Parliament" for cars heading eastbound to the Distillery Loop respectively. As such, the TTC used improvised magnetic dashboard route signs (often placed on the short turn flap below the vehicle's windshield) – "514 Dufferin Gate" and/or "514 Distillery" respectively.

== Service ==
Service ran every 8 to 9 minutes in the rush hours and every 15 minutes in the off-peak. The line was projected to attract 51,000 new riders annually and could provide up to 15 per cent more capacity along King Street where the 504 and 514 routes would overlap. The busiest section of the 504 King route was between Bathurst Street and John Street which carried 40,000 of the route's 65,000 daily riders. The new Cherry streetcar line allowed the TTC to redeploy some of the 17 morning and nine afternoon buses it had been using to accommodate 504 King crowds during rush hours. The 514 service opened with a mix of old high-floor CLRV and new low-floor Flexity Outlook streetcars.
