= Cherry Street (Toronto) =

Thoroughfare in Toronto, Ontario

Coordinates: 43.6446°N 79.3518°W

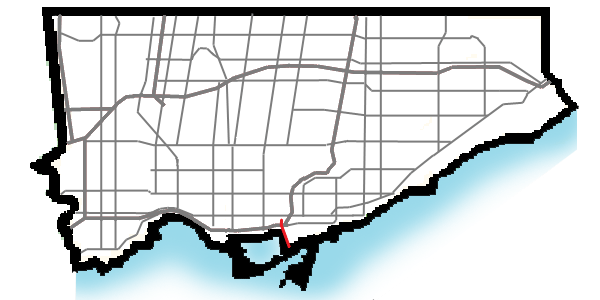
- Interactive map of Cherry Street (Toronto)
- Maintained by: City of Toronto government
- Length: 2.2 km (1.4 mi)
- South end: Cherry Beach
- Major junctions: Lake Shore Boulevard –Subsumed into Lake Shore–
- North end: Eastern Avenue

Cherry Street is a north–south arterial roadway in the eastern downtown of Toronto, Ontario, Canada. It is situated in a former industrial area, that is now the site of redevelopment. It connects Eastern Avenue south to Lake Shore Boulevard (where a short section was subsumed into Lake Shore when it was extended east) then to the Toronto Port Lands district, and terminates at Lake Ontario at Cherry Beach.

== Description ==
Its northern terminus is at Eastern Avenue. A co-linear street, named Sumach St., continues north. It crosses Front St. and Mill St. proceeding south to the railway viaduct and Lake Shore Boulevard. The road has a dedicated right-of-way for streetcars beginning at King Street East and Sumach, which continues south on Cherry, to its terminus known as Distillery Loop beside the railway viaduct. The loop is opposite the Distillery District on the west side of Cherry. On the eastern side of the street is the redevelopment site, first built for the 2015 Pan American Games athletes' village, now being turned into a residential apartments district known as the Canary District.

The road proceeds south of Lake Shore Boulevard into the Port Lands district where it intersects with Commissioners Street and Unwin Ave. After crossing Unwin, it continues another 200 metres (220 yd) south to Cherry Beach, where it ends in a roundabout.

Cherry Street is carried over the waterways of the Port Lands by Toronto's only two lift bridges: a smaller one where it crosses the Keating Channel and a larger one where it crosses the channel to the turning basin.

According to The Canadian Entomologist Cherry Street, between Unwin Ave. and the Keating Channel was the first recorded site of termite infestation in Ontario.

=== 2015 Pan American Games ===
During the 2015 Pan American Games and Parapan American Games thousands of athletes were housed in a temporary athlete's village just east of the intersection of Cherry and Front streets. Temporary pavilions were built on a large vacant lot on the southwest corner of Cherry and Front which served as the athletes' dining area, as well as a temporary bus marshalling yard for the fleet of rented buses which carried athletes to their venues.

The apartments that housed the athletes were made available only partially complete. Since the athletes dined at central cafeterias, completing the apartments' kitchens was postponed. That way the rooms intended to serve as kitchens could be used as an additional bedroom. Other fittings, like hardwood floors that could be damaged by the spikes on sports shoes, were installed after the games were over.

The intersection of Cherry and Front streets, the gateway to the athletes' village, is being described as the future gateway to the Canary District, 200 acres of former light industrial land being redeveloped into a residential area.

=== Streetcar route ===
In 2012, the Toronto Transit Commission started to construct the first segment of a new streetcar line beside Cherry Street, from King Street 700 metres (770 yd) south to just north of Lake Shore Boulevard. This initial segment was projected to cost CA$90 million. Original plans called for the line to extend further south into redeveloped portlands. That extension pushed the budget for the line to CA$300 million.

In early plans, athletes would have ridden a streetcar to Union Station to make connections to the games' scattered venues. However, the streetcar's opening was delayed until after the games were over.

The TTC began service on Cherry Street in 2016. The route, named the 514 Cherry, ran from the Cherry Loop, along King, to the Dufferin Gate Loop, adjacent to Exhibition Place. This route was discontinued in 2018, replaced by a re-routing of the 504 King streetcar. The route of the 504A begins in the west at Dundas West Station, travels south along Dundas Street, Roncesvalles Avenue, then east on King Street to Cherry Street. In the east, the 504B begins at Broadview Station, travels south along Broadview, west on Queen Street and King Street and terminates at the Dufferin loop by Exhibition Place.

=== Future development ===
Lower Cherry Street, south of Lake Shore Boulevard, will be re-aligned west, as part of the development of the Villiers Island. Developers plan a dense knot of high-rise and mid-rise development on lower Cherry, as part of the development. It will pass under the Gardiner Expressway and cross the Keating Channel over two new bridges, one for vehicles, and the other for streetcars.
