= Canary District =

Planned neighbourhood in Toronto, Canada

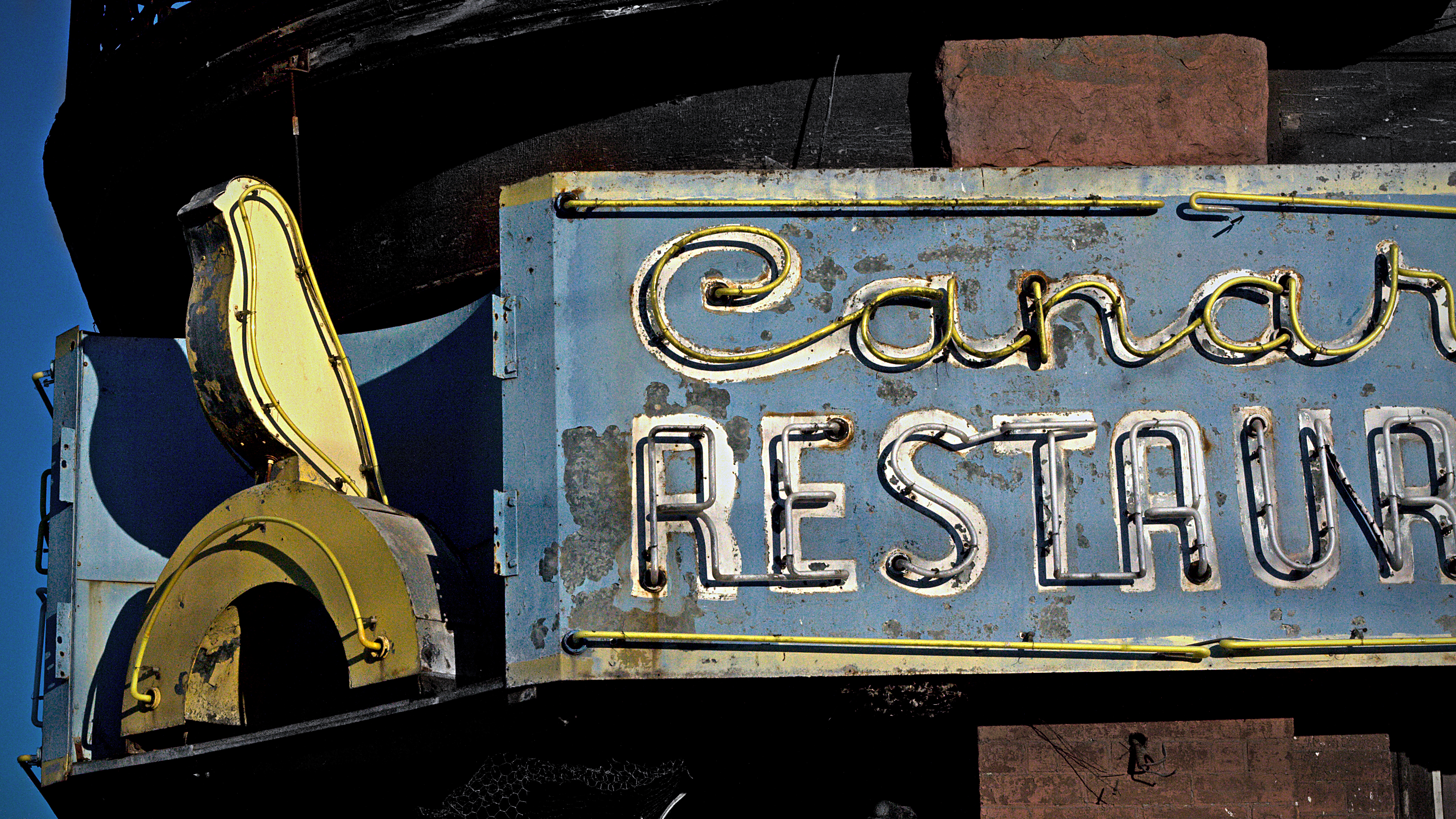
The Canary District is named after the old Canary Restaurant.

The Canary District is a planned neighbourhood in Toronto's West Don Lands mixed-use development. The area was formerly industrial land, cut off from the city by an elevated roadway and two rail corridors, sitting in a floodplain. Six initial buildings initially served as the 2015 Pan American Games Athletes' Village for the 2015 Pan American Games. Those buildings were then finished and converted to private residences. More buildings have since been constructed for private residences, with Front Street lined with stores, businesses and restaurants.

For decades an iconic restaurant, the Canary, was located in the Cherry Street Hotel, a heritage building on the southeast corner of Cherry and Front streets, the gateway to the new district. The restaurant mounted a large neon Canary, and developers chose to name the new development after the iconic restaurant.

== Description ==
Canary District is bounded on the west by Cherry Street and on the east by the Don River; on the north by Eastern Avenue and on the south by the railroad tracks. The natural focal point of the area is Corktown Common Park.

There are no separate dwellings in the area; all the residences are either condominiums or rental housing. There more than a dozen building developments — most now complete but several are still under construction or in the pre-construction phase. Once all the planned developments are complete there will be more than 6,000 apartments in the district, making for a population of more than 10,000. The area also includes the Cooper Koo YMCA, a student residence owned by George Brown College, and an indigenous health hub run by Anishnawbe Health Toronto.

== Construction ==
The project is developed by a joint venture, Dundee Kilmer Developments, formed by Toronto-based real estate company Dream and Kilmer Van Norstrand Co. Construction companies Ledcor Group of Companies and EllisDon have completed the construction on the project. All buildings in the district are built to Leadership in Energy and Environmental Design (LEED) Gold standards.

The first residential buildings ready for occupancy at the western end of the district served as the Athlete's Village. The apartments that housed the athletes were not fully finished. The apartments' wood flooring was installed after the games were over, so the athletes gear wouldn't damage the floors' finish. Since the athletes dined in central cafeterias the apartments' kitchens was used as an additional bedroom, with the kitchen fittings installed when the games were over. A total of 787 units were completed in time for the Games. Conversion from athlete's housing was completed in April 2016 and the first permanent residents will move into the buildings in May 2016.

In conjunction with the residential development, Corktown Common park was built as a barrier to flooding from the Don River, which forms the eastern boundary of the area. The Distillery Loop and Cherry Street branch was added to the existing 504 King streetcar line. Several heritage buildings were preserved, including the original Canary Restaurant building (a former 1850s school), the CN Police building, and the Dominion Foundry Site were preserved.

In 2020-21 the Government of Ontario issued a Minister's Zoning Order (MZO) for the Dominion Foundry Site and attempted to demolish the heritage buildings on it in preparation for sale to Aspen Ridge, a prominent development company owned by the de Gasperis family. The public protested the demolition and successfully stopped the plan. The site was purchased by Aspen Ridge in March 2022 and a development plan preserving the remaining heritage buildings is going forward.
