= West Don Lands =

- Neighbourhood
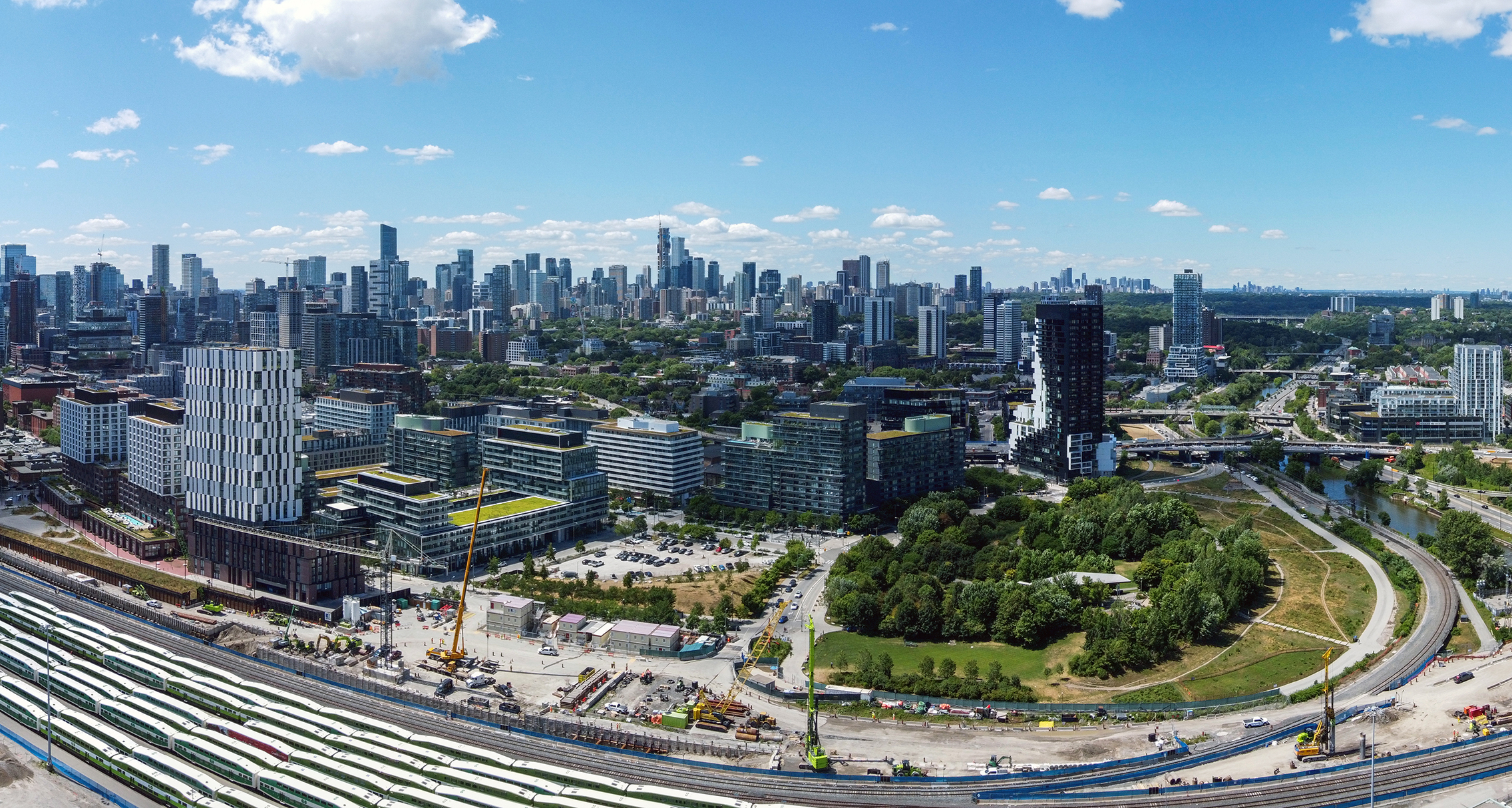
- Aerial view of West Don Lands in 2025

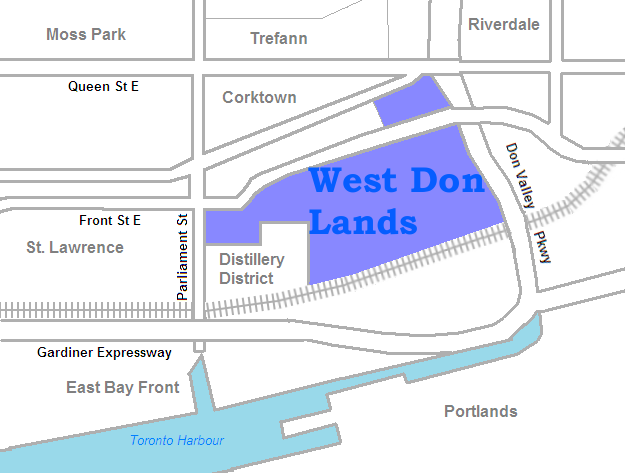
- West Don Lands area

- Location within Toronto
- Coordinates: 43.655°N 79.353°W
- Country: Canada
- Province: Ontario
- City: Toronto

The West Don Lands are the site of a neighbourhood under construction in Toronto, Ontario, Canada. The area is bordered by the Don River, King Street, Parliament Street and the rail line adjacent to the Gardiner Expressway. It is 80 hectares (200 acres) in size. A former industrial area, the area is being rebuilt as a mixed-use neighbourhood.

== History ==
After the purchase of Toronto, the area was set aside as a Crown Reserve when York was founded. The area from Berkeley east to the Don River and north to Queen Street was designated for a large city park. It was sold off to private developers in the 1830s to finance the construction of a new city hospital. The Corktown community grew and was home to working-class Irish immigrants. To the south, the Gooderham and Worts distillery was founded, and it dumped its waste in the area. It kept cattle and pigs in the area to feed off the distillery waste, but this introduced a manure problem. Railways came to Toronto in the 1850s, entering the Don Lands along the Don River from the north, and across the Don River from the east. The Don River was straightened and the Taddle Creek which ran through the area was buried. By the late nineteenth century, most of the land was industrial or owned by the railways, and it became the site of an array of factories and warehouses, including William Davies Company, one of the largest pork processing facilities in the world.

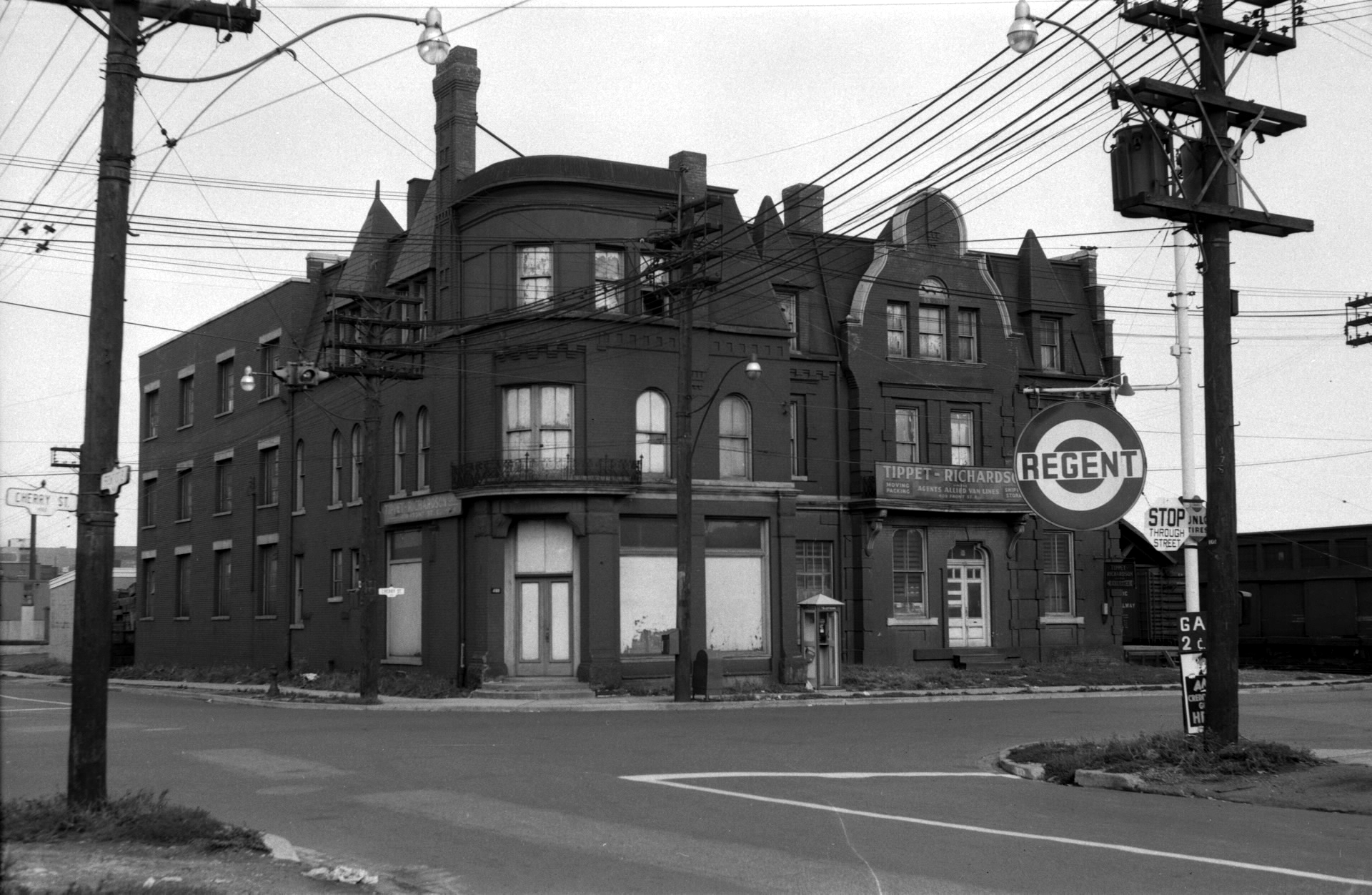
View of the West Don Lands and the Cherry Street Hotel building from Cherry Street and Front Street.

The Davies Company and Gooderham's were prosperous in the first half of the twentieth century, but both sites were in decline. Davies merged with other meatpackers and moved the bulk of its operations to the west of Toronto. Gooderham's was merged with the Hiram Walker distillery and moved much of its production to the Hiram Walker facility out of town. The Davies Company closed in the 1980s, and Gooderham's closed in 1991. By the 1980s, the area was heavily polluted and not a desirable location for the industry, which sought locations for large one-story facilities in the suburbs. The area declined and much of the land abandoned as it required expensive clean-up before conversion to other uses. Another factor against conversion to other uses was that the lands were floodplains and as such could not be the site of residences.

=== Failed Ataratiri project (1987–2001) ===
In 1987, the area was expropriated by the Ontario government at the urging of Toronto mayor Art Eggleton. The city proposed creating a new community of 14,000 called Ataratiri to solve Toronto's pressing subsidized housing crisis.

The Ataratiri project was to have consisted of a mix of subsidized and market-priced housing, similar to the development of the St. Lawrence neighborhood further west. The name for the project was taken from the Wyandot word for "supported by clay" in reference to the clay soil of the area. After investing a considerable amount of money purchasing and clearing the site, the project eventually failed to attract private investors. The industrial history meant the soil was highly polluted and needed expensive cleanup before any residents could live there. The risk of flooding from the Don River also required a flood barrier to be erected. By 1992, the city and province had already invested some CA$350 million, and new estimates put the final cost at more than a billion dollars more. The real estate market had also collapsed, making any private investment unlikely. The new Ontario government of Bob Rae thus decided to cancel the project in 1992. The land sat mostly unused.

A number of plans were advanced for the land. For a time the provincial government considered selling it to a developer who wanted to build a harness racing facility, but local opposition put a halt to it. The lands were also a central part of Toronto's bid for the 2008 Summer Olympics. In 2001, Ontario Premier Mike Harris pushed for a complete redevelopment of Toronto's waterfront, but mayor Mel Lastman objected to the idea of removing parts of the Gardiner Expressway. During Lastman's six years in office, no progress was made on redeveloping the site.

=== Redevelopment (2001–present) ===
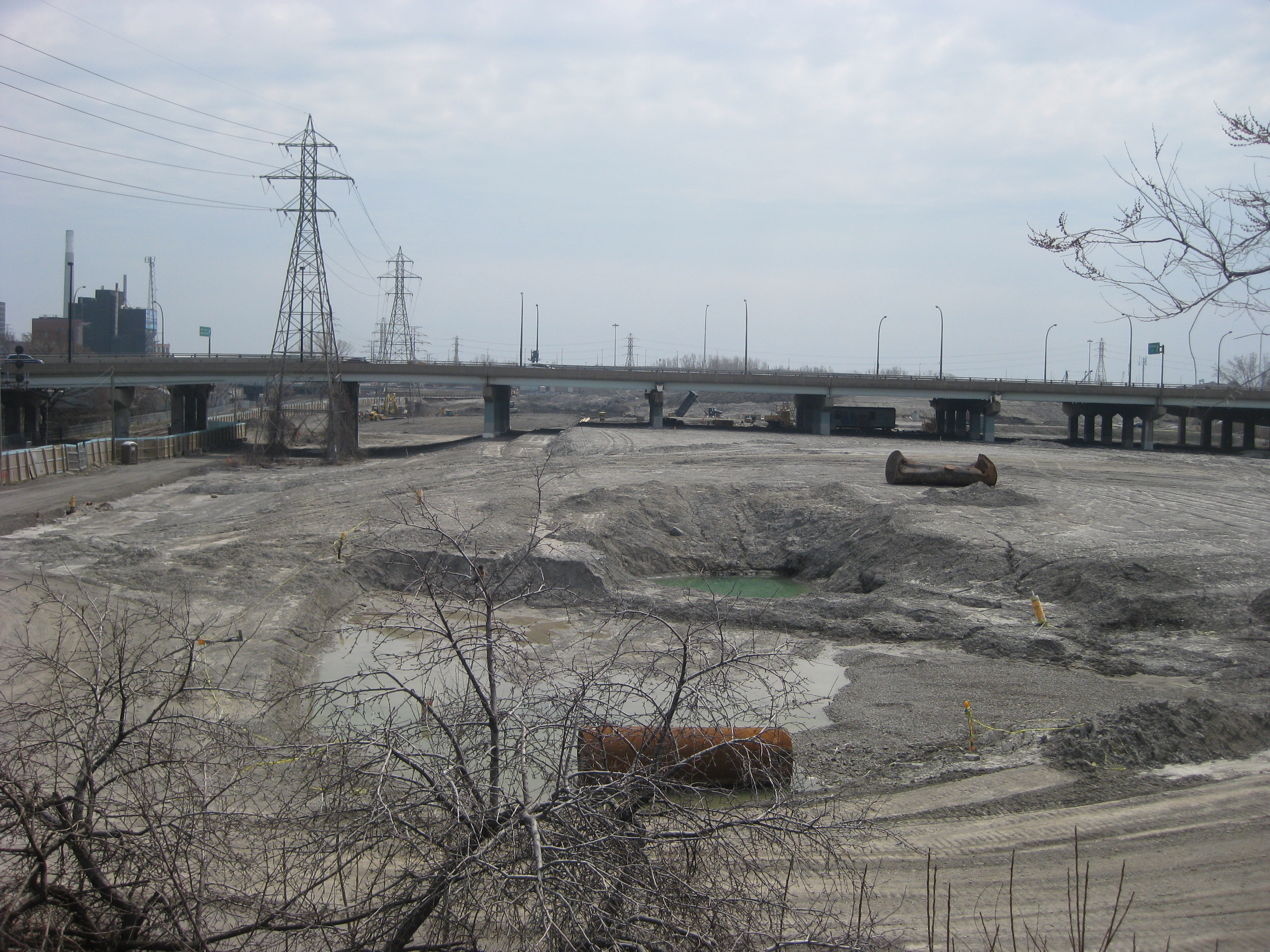
West Don Lands in 2009, prior to redevelopment

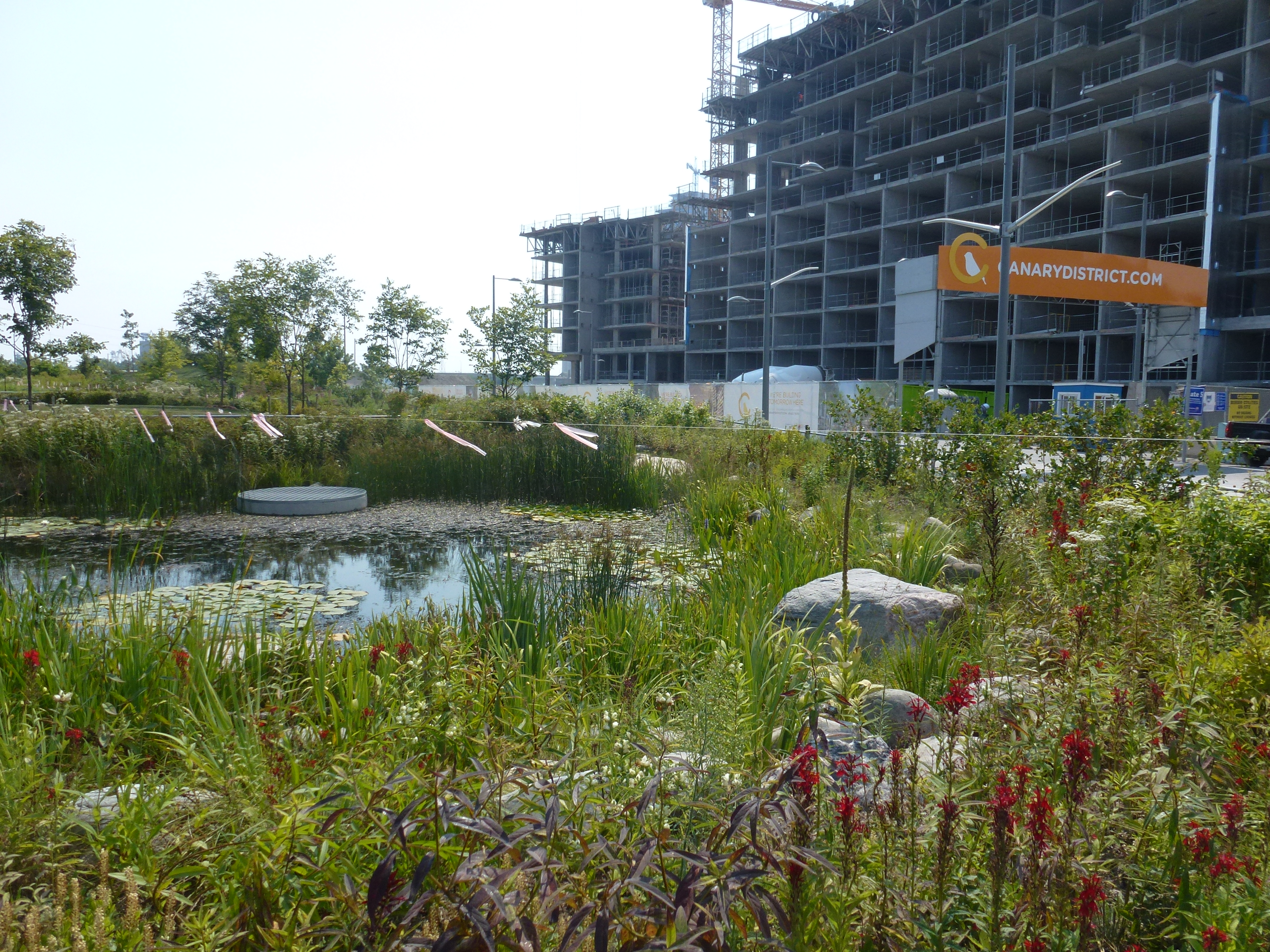
Construction at the West Don Lands from Corktown Common in 2013

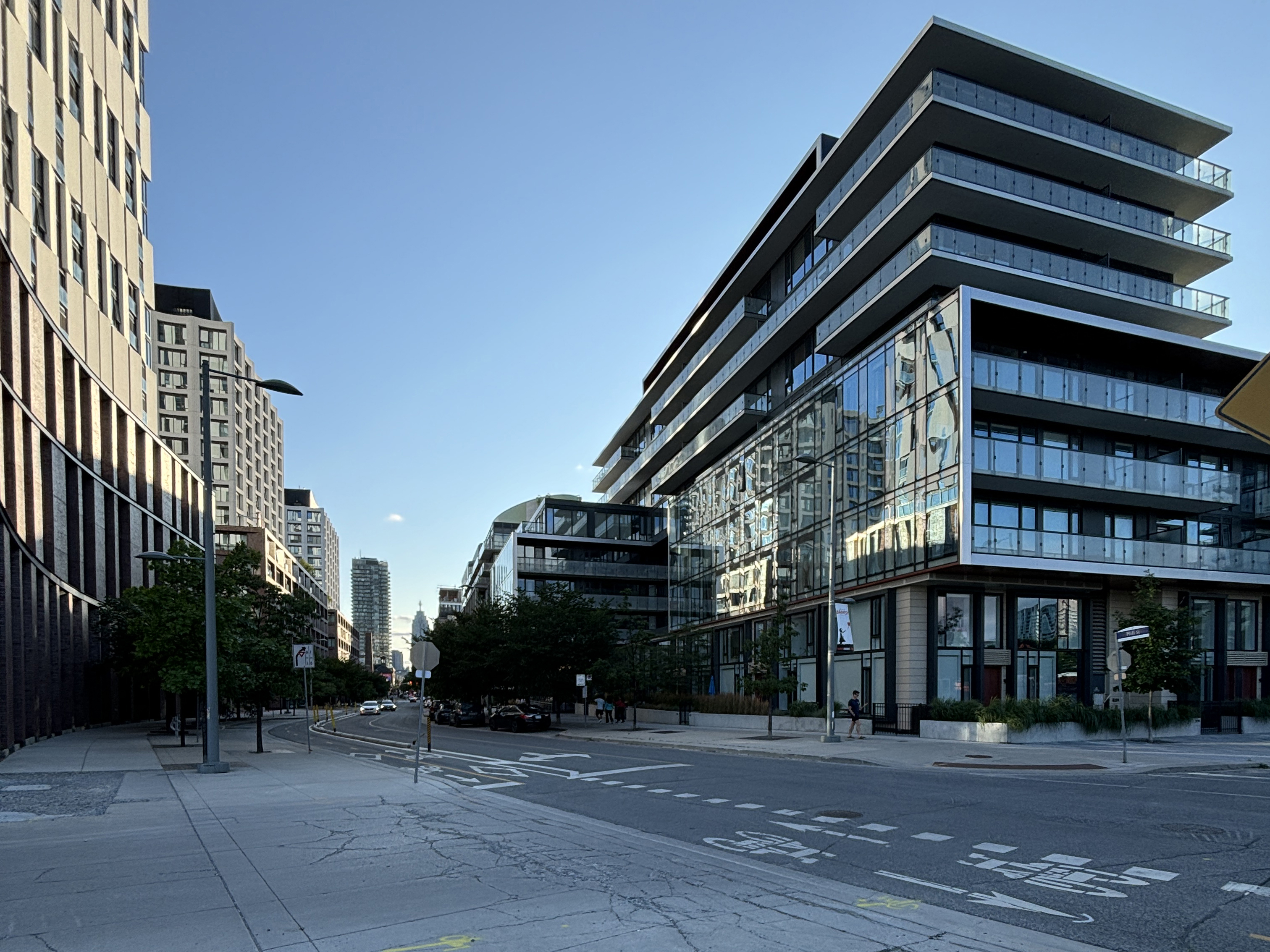
Mill Street in West Don Lands

In 2001, the new Waterfront Toronto agency was commissioned by the federal, provincial and municipal governments to redevelop the Toronto waterfront. It was given the responsibility to take lands owned by either of the three levels of government in the waterfront area and make them available for development, sometimes building infrastructure such as parks or roads to make development possible. A flood protection landform was built to allow development to proceed.

In 2006, the agency announced a new plan to create a residential community in the abandoned area. Under the overall plan of the Waterfront Toronto initiative, plans for the area include nearly 6,000 new residential spaces with twenty percent being allocated as 'affordable' or 'subsidized' housing. Redevelopment plans include extensive integration with Toronto transit routes and 23 acres (9.3 ha) of public greenspace. The new Corktown Common is to be the recreational core of the project, linking the Don Valley Discovery Walk to the Toronto waterfront. The location is central to providing improved non-vehicular access from throughout the city to hundreds of thousands of pedestrians, cyclists, inline skaters and mobility scooter users.

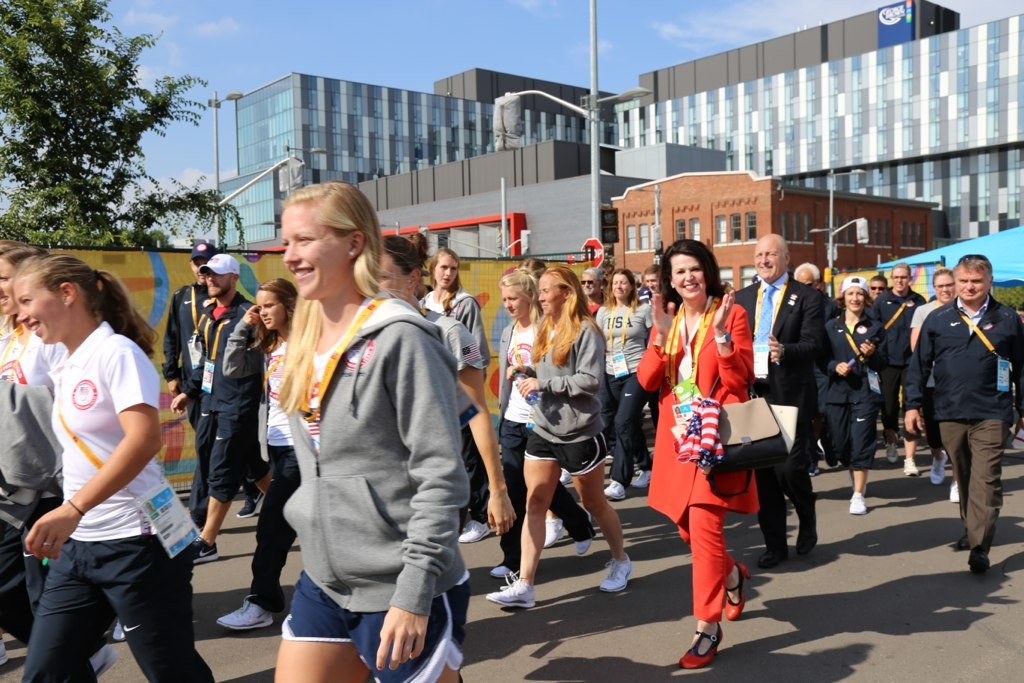
U.S. Ambassador Bruce Heyman visits the Athletes Village during the 2015 Pan-Am Games. Development of the Athletes Village in the West Don Lands was announced in 2009.

The plan was envisaged to take 12 years to develop. This changed in 2009 when it was announced that the West Don Lands would be the home of the athlete's village for the 2015 Pan American Games. Bounded by Old Eastern Avenue, Cherry Street, Mill Street and Bayview Avenue, the development now is being referred to as Canary District. To build the athlete's village in six years, Infrastructure Ontario/Ontario Realty Corporation contracted out the development of the village on a "fixed-price" contract with developer DundeeKilmer for $514 million. This included roadways, a YMCA and George Brown College student residence. The village buildings, encompassing 787 units, were completed in time for the games and individual units will be finished with kitchens and finishings for residents after the games. Two further residential buildings will be constructed by the developer.

In August 2012, Toronto Mayor Ford officially opened Underpass Park, a new public space in the West Don Lands district. The Corktown Common park to the east of Bayview was completed in 2013. It serves as open space, recreational space and a flood barrier for the development. Bayview Avenue was re-routed around the park to connect to Front Street at the west end of the park.

In 2014, Toronto Community Housing opened three new buildings in the neighbourhood. A two-building four-storey apartment complex of 115 units for families opened at St. Lawrence and River Streets. An eight-storey building of 128 one-bedroom units for seniors opened on King Street East. Two heritage buildings at the corner of Front and Cherry were preserved and will be re-purposed at a future date.

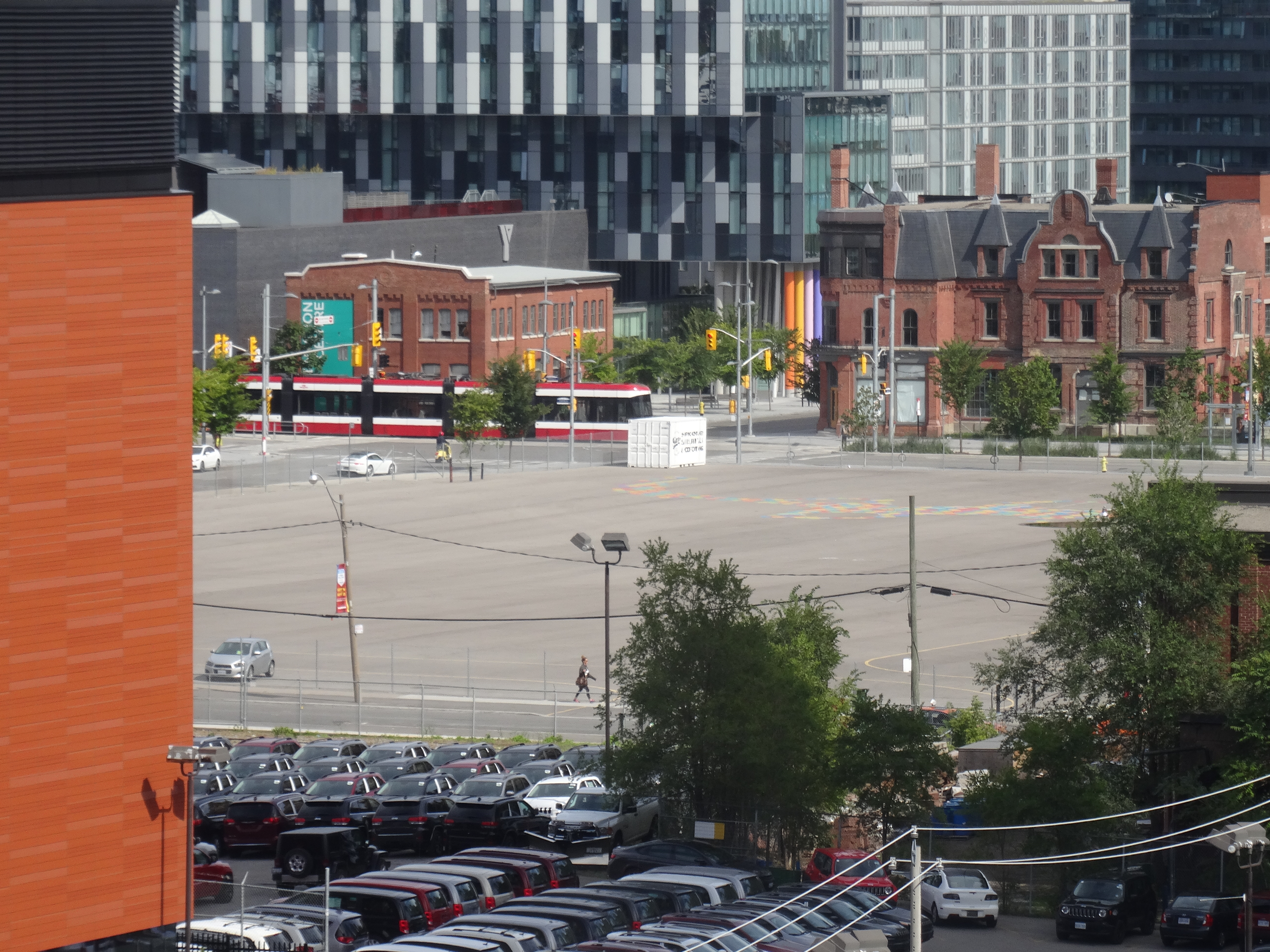
In June 2016, the 514 Cherry streetcar line began operations in the West Don Lands.

In August 2015, rails for a new streetcar line along Cherry Street were completed as far south as the Distillery District. The rails are in a right-of-way along the eastern side of Cherry and Sumach streets. The new 514 Cherry streetcar line began operation in June 2016.

In April 2016, the conversion of the Pan-Am Games village was completed. The fencing around the area was removed and residents of the Canary District development moved into their buildings in May 2016. YMCA also opened in the same month. In fall 2016, the George Brown Student Residence building opened to students.

== See also ==
- Port Lands
- Corktown
- Regent Park
- St. Lawrence Market
