= Distillery Loop and Cherry Street branch =

Streetcar loop and branch line in Toronto

Distillery Loop
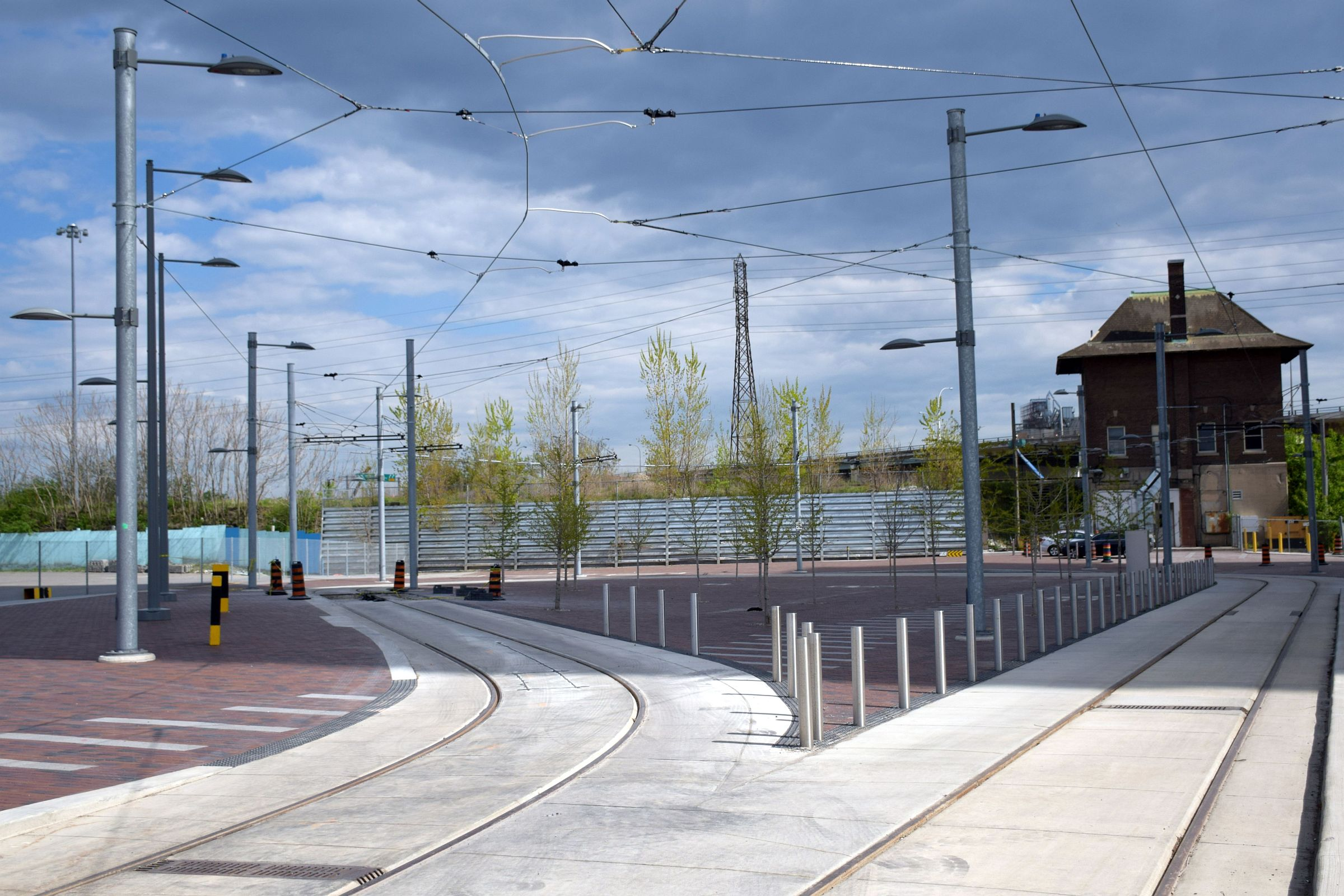

General information
- Location: Cherry Street, Toronto, Ontario; Canada
- Coordinates: 43°39′02″N 79°21′24″W
- Operated by: Toronto Transit Commission

Construction
- Structure type: Streetcar loop
- Accessible: Yes

History
- Opening: June 19, 2016
Location

Distillery Loop is a streetcar loop in the Toronto streetcar system in Toronto, Ontario, Canada that lies at the south end of the Cherry Street branch – originally dubbed the Cherry Street streetcar line – that runs from a streetcar junction on King Street East south along Sumach and Cherry Streets. The loop opened in June 2016 and is some of the newer streetcar infrastructure in the city. The Cherry Street branch is currently served by the 504A King and 508 Lake Shore streetcar routes, which have their eastern terminus at Distillery Loop.

== Distillery Loop ==
Distillery Loop is located south of Mill Street and north of the railway viaduct on the east side of Cherry Street. It lies across the street from Distillery Lane in the Distillery District. The loop runs counter-clockwise. With the junction at Sumach Street and King Street, the loop can turn streetcars coming from either direction along King Street.

Decorative features at the loop include paving blocks, a small grove of young trees, and a small flower bed between the track and the street. At the railway viaduct on the southern side of the loop stands the Cherry Street Tower which the Toronto Terminals Railway once used to control the eastern approach to Union Station. The signal tower is today a protected heritage structure.

The southbound approach to Distillery Loop has a wheel greaser that is automatically activated by GPS; however, the greaser only functions for the newer Flexity streetcars.

== Cherry Street branch ==
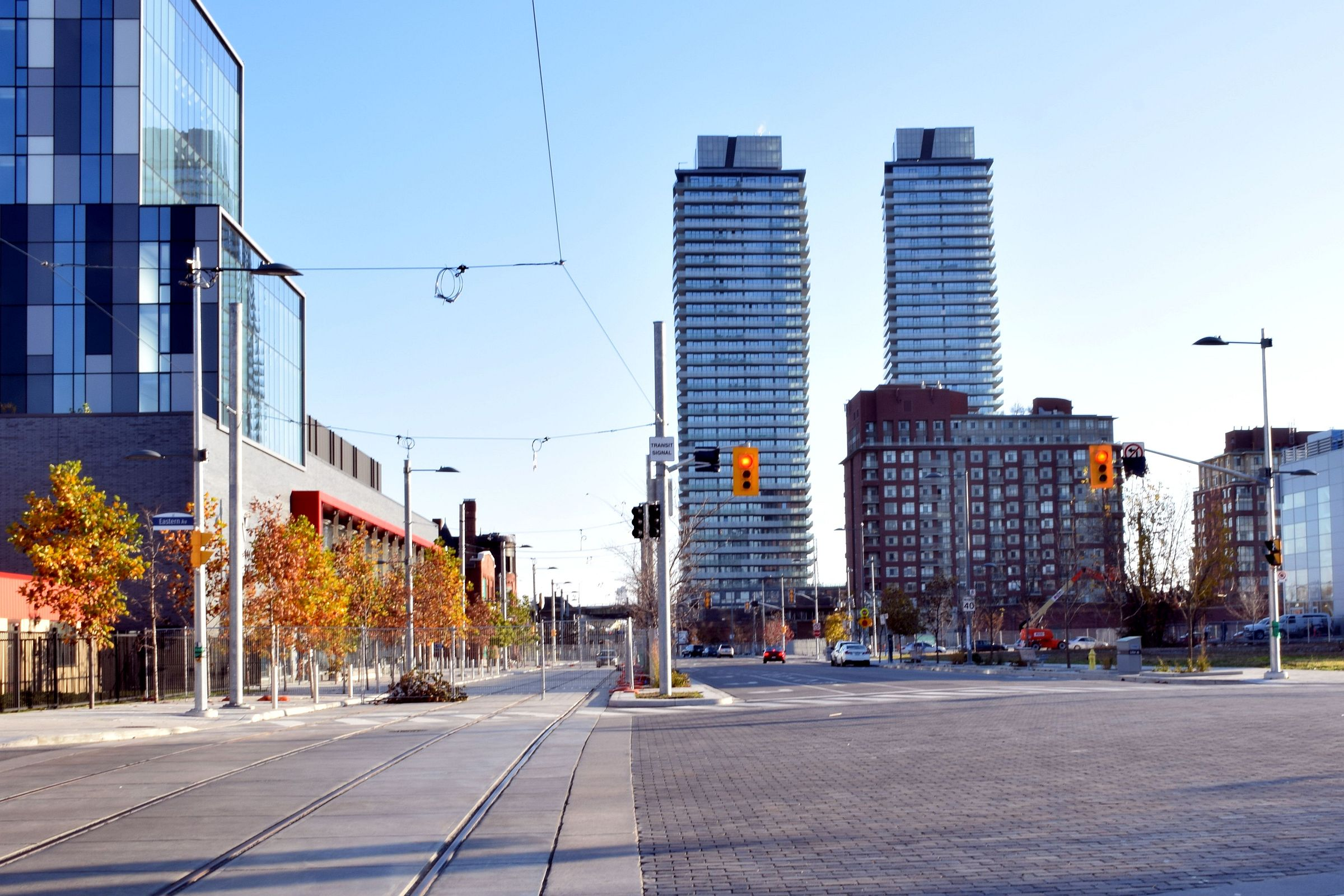
View of the full width of Cherry Street south of Eastern Avenue

Running on a separated right-of-way, the branch line is approximately 700 metres (0.43 mi) long and has three stops, each with a platform. Both streetcar tracks run on the east side of the street, with a tree-lined median separating them from two automobile lanes, and bike lanes on either side of them. The entire width is 32.5 metres (107 ft), including sidewalks 5 metres (16 ft) wide.

The branch line was built by Waterfront Toronto, in cooperation with the Toronto Transit Commission, to serve the West Don Lands neighbourhood and the Distillery District. The new West Don Lands neighbourhood was expected to have 6,000 units once opened. The projected cost of the branch line was $90 million.

== History ==
In 2007, the plan for the Cherry Street streetcar line was finalized. Construction started south of King Street in 2012. In April and May 2014, the TTC constructed the junction at the corner of King Street East and Sumach Street. Completion and opening of the branch were delayed until after the 2015 Pan American Games; the new streetcar right-of-way crossed the security zone of the competition's Athletes Village.

On June 19, 2016, the Cherry Street streetcar line opened and was originally served by the new 514 Cherry route, using Distillery Loop as the route's eastern terminal. On October 7, 2018, the 514 Cherry route was discontinued, and replaced by route 504A King running from Dundas West Station to Distillery Loop. As of September 3, 2025, Distillery Loop is also served by route 508 Lake Shore streetcars during both the AM and PM rush hours.

=== Track problems ===
A few problems were reported within several months of the line's opening. Traffic lights were poorly timed at the intersections of Cherry and Front Streets and Cherry Street and Eastern Avenue. Along Queens Quay, painted turn lane lines were not clear enough to discourage motorists from accidentally getting onto the streetcar right-of-way and then being trapped there. Because of complaints of squealing wheels at the corner of Sumach and King Streets, as well as at the Distillery Loop, streetcars were replaced by buses overnight along the Cherry Street line. Late night streetcar service was restored on July 15, 2017, as TTC riders found the transfer between the night bus and streetcar to be inconvenient. To address the reported problems, the TTC:

- Added extra signage to discourage motorists from driving on the tracks.
- Imposed a maximum speed of 10 km/h (6.2 mph) at Sumach and King.
- Use only Flexity streetcars which have an on-board wheel lubrication system.
- Enhanced the on-board wheel lubrication system for higher lubricant output.

In February 2020, city councillor Kristyn Wong-Tam reported that residents near the Cherry Street branch continued to complain about noise and vibration from streetcars turning at the corner of King and Sumach Streets. There were also complaints of a rumbling noise as streetcars passed over the eastbound trailing-point switch at the intersection. In June 2020, the TTC had made several changes to address track noise, some of which could be applied to other locations on the streetcar system:

- Retired all CLRVs, which were noisier than Flexity streetcars.
- Installed a wheel lubricator at Distillery Loop.
- Installed wheel-mounted vibration dampening rings on 10 Flexity streetcars (with installation on 60 more in 2020) to reduce side noise by 5–7 dBA.
- Installed on-board wheel lubricators on half of the fleet with plans to add them to the remainder of the vehicles.
- Adjusted curve geometry with plans for further refinement.
- Ground the bottom of switch points to sit flush and reduce the slapping sound as wheels pass over them.
- Tested a new design for flexible switch points with a trial installation at College Street and Lansdowne Avenue.

In August and September 2022, the TTC replaced tracks at the intersection of King and Sumach Streets in order to resolve the noise problem. A new westbound trailing point switch of a different design was installed to eliminate the clacking sound when streetcar wheels passed over the switch. New track lubricators were to be added to the eastbound and northbound approaches to the intersection.

== Future ==
As part of the framework for redevelopment of Toronto's Port Lands, the city is aiming to have 55 percent of all trips to the area made by public transit. As part of this initiative, it was recommended that the streetcar service along Cherry Street be extended south from Distillery Loop to the Ship Channel in a dedicated right-of-way on the east side of the street in similar fashion to the former 514 service. This would make Cherry Street the primary north–south transit route within the western Port Lands and would include stops at a re-aligned Queens Quay and Commissioners Street.

External images
- Existing Distillery Loop
- Cherry portal options
- Distillery Loop: Option 3
- Distillery Loop: Option 4

The proposed East Bayfront LRT was to have linked Union station via Queens Quay East either to a temporary loop at Parliament Street or to Distillery Loop. However, by June 2021, the plan was changed: a new Parliament loop would not be built and Distillery Loop would be bypassed; instead, the line would proceed south on a realigned Cherry Street to a new Polson Loop near the intersection of Cherry and Polson Streets. One reason for the change was the risk of conflict with construction of the planned Ontario Line, which is to run under Distillery Loop. Another reason was that a connection to Queens Quay would require that Distillery Loop be relocated to make way for a streetcar passage under the Union Station Rail Corridor. The planners for the East Bayfront LRT considered, at the time, four alternative methods of passing under the railway corridor, scheduled for a later project, preferring either option 3 or 4:

1. Rebuilding the railway bridge over Cherry Street and moving the railway signal tower
2. Using the existing bridge portal with streetcars operating in mixed traffic
3. Building a new streetcar portal under the railway corridor after moving the railway signal tower
4. Building a new streetcar portal on the east side of the railway signal tower
