= Corktown Common =

Park in Toronto, Ontario, Canada

Coordinates: 43.653965°N 79.352101°W

- Interactive map of Corktown Common
- Location: West Don Lands
- Area: 7.3 hectares (18 acres)
- Created: Waterfront Toronto
- Operator: Toronto Parks
- Open: 2013

Corktown Common is a park in the southeastern portion of the West Don Lands neighbourhood in Toronto, Ontario, Canada which opened in 2013. It borders the Don River to the east. It was built on remediated industrial lands to be the centrepiece of a new emerging neighbourhood in downtown Toronto. It also provides a barrier to flooding from the Don River.

== History ==
The West Don Lands, including what is now the Corktown Common, was once an industrialized area, notably occupied by the pork-processing plants of the William Davies Company and acres of railyards. After mergers in the packed meat industry, pork processing moved gradually away from the site. By the 1970s, much of the land was left abandoned. In 1988, the West Don Lands was expropriated by the City of Toronto in partnership with the Government of Ontario in order to build a new community known as Atatiri. The industrial history meant the soil was highly polluted and needed expensive cleanup before any residents could live there. The risk of flooding from the Don River also required a flood barrier to be erected. By 1992 the city and province had already invested some $350 million in purchasing and clearing the site, and new estimates put the final cost at more than a billion more. The real estate market had also collapsed, making any private investment unlikely. The new Ontario government of Bob Rae thus decided to cancel the project in 1993 and the West Don Lands was left deserted for the next 15 years.

In the 2000s, the site was shown renewed interest after the formation of Waterfront Toronto, a joint venture of the City of Toronto, the Government of Ontario and the Government of Canada. The agency's purpose was to reclaim the waterfront for development after decades of decay. Revitalization of the West Don Lands was identified is one of the first four priority projects for Waterfront Toronto and in 2004 the WDL Precinct Plan was created. At the same time work on an Environmental Assessment for flood protection works for the Don River mouth began which ultimately led to construction of a flood protection landform (berm) that took the WDL out of the flood plain of the Don River and cleared the way for development. The 2008 financial crisis dimmed the prospects of timely implementation of the Precinct Plan, but that changed when Toronto won the bid to host the 2015 Pan American Games. The West Don Lands was chosen to host the athletes' village for the games and a large part of the planned precinct plan was built to first house the athletes and then be turned over to condo purchasers.

The Commons site itself was located in the flood plain of the Don River and required soil remediation. The Common's berm is a flood protection landform which was started in 2007 and was necessary before any other development of the West Don Lands could occur. The berm also meant clean soil was brought to the site to make it suitable for recreation.

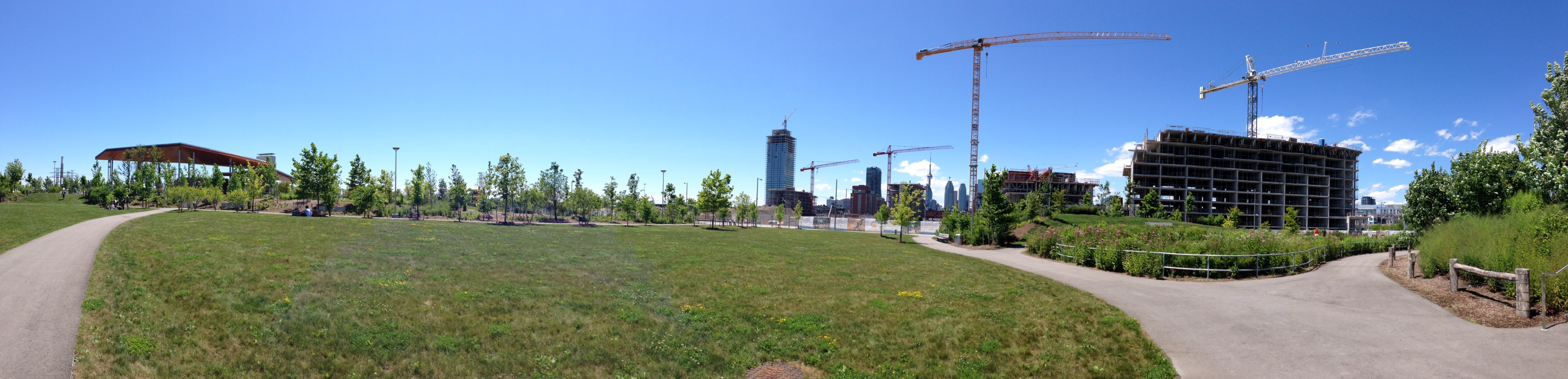
Corktown Common central lawn in July 2013

== Park description ==
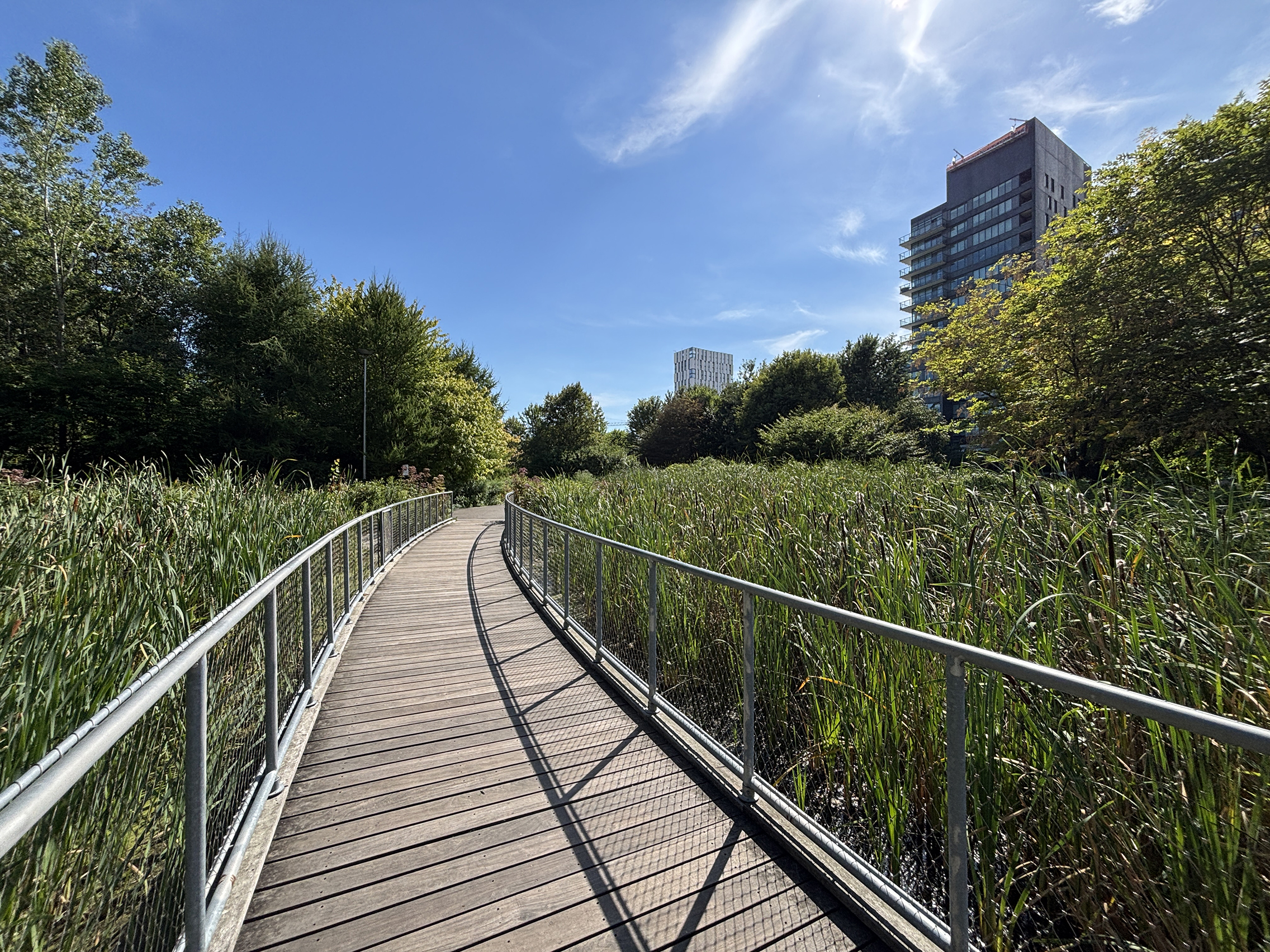
Urban Marsh

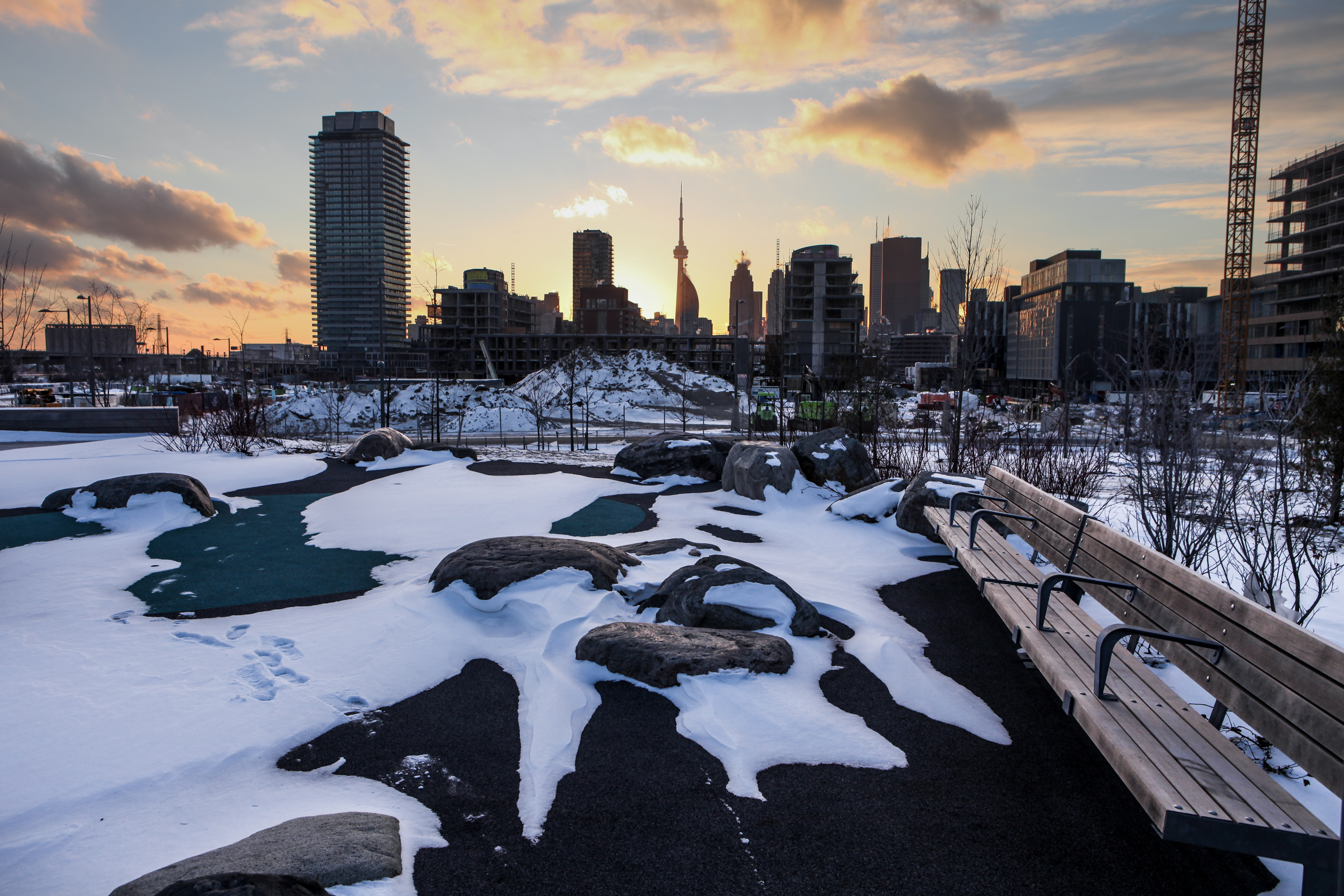
Children play area in winter

The Corktown Common was a CA$135 million project and it is a hilly park with pathways and prairie grasses, overlooking the mouth of the Don River, which doubles as a 8.5 m (28 ft)-high berm designed to protect the eastern downtown from a major flood, even a 500-year storm by shunting potential flood waters south toward the lake. Its name before it opened was the Don River Park. The park was designed by Michael Van Valkenburgh Associates, and opened with over 700 trees and thousands of shrubs and grasses that are native to Southern Ontario's Carolinian forest ecosystem.

The park contains playgrounds, a splash pad, an athletic field, open lawns, a marsh, tables, benches, a barbecue, a fireplace, bike paths, a boardwalk and an off-leash dog area. There is a public art sculpture titled No Shoes by Mark di Suvero. On the river side of the park, there is a 3.2 hectares (7.9 acres) urban prairie.

The Corktown Common is located east of Bayview Avenue, south of King Street, west of GO/CN railroad lines and the Don River to the rail corridor in the south. There is also an entrance from the Don Valley Trail.

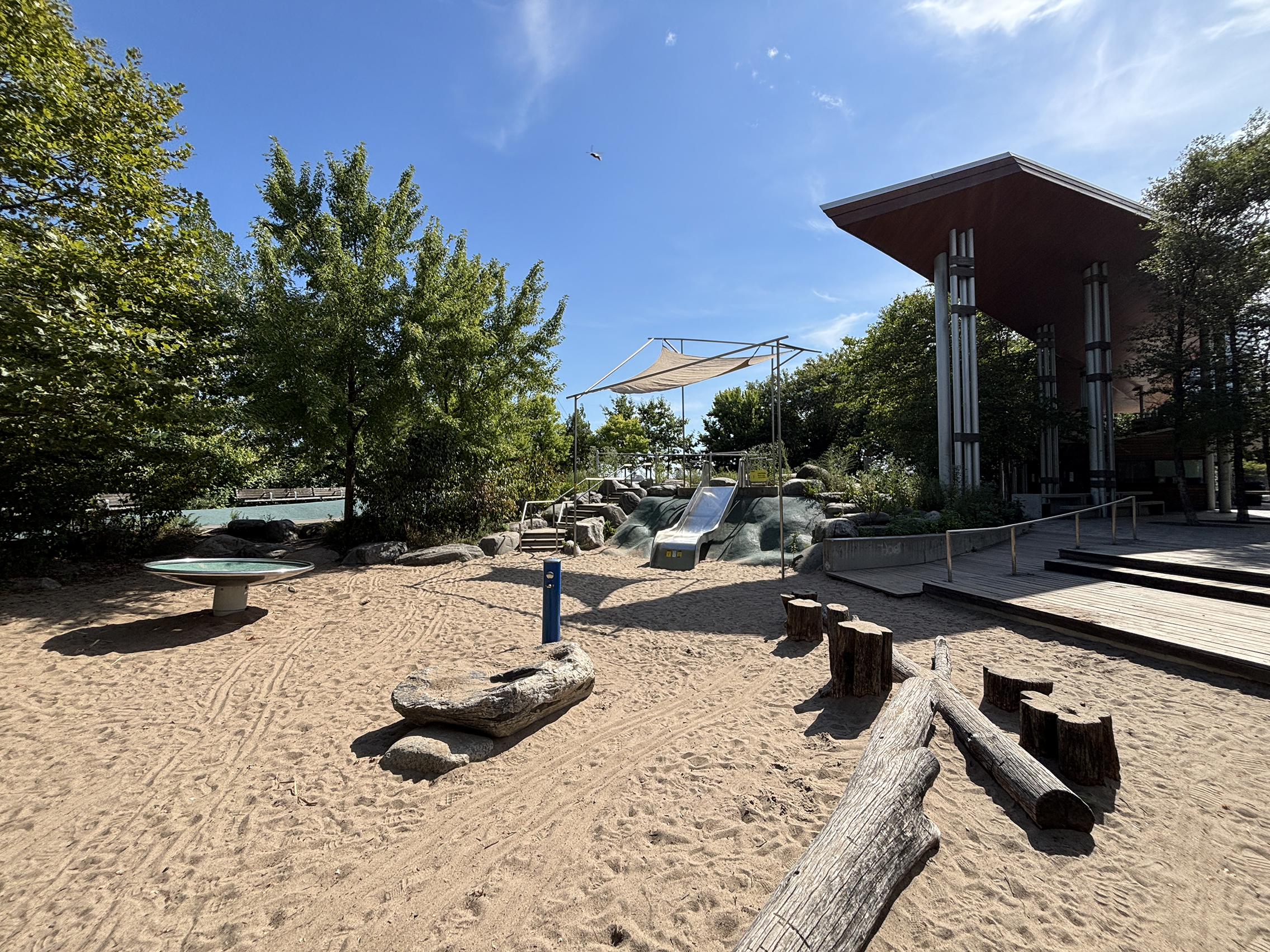
Children Play Area

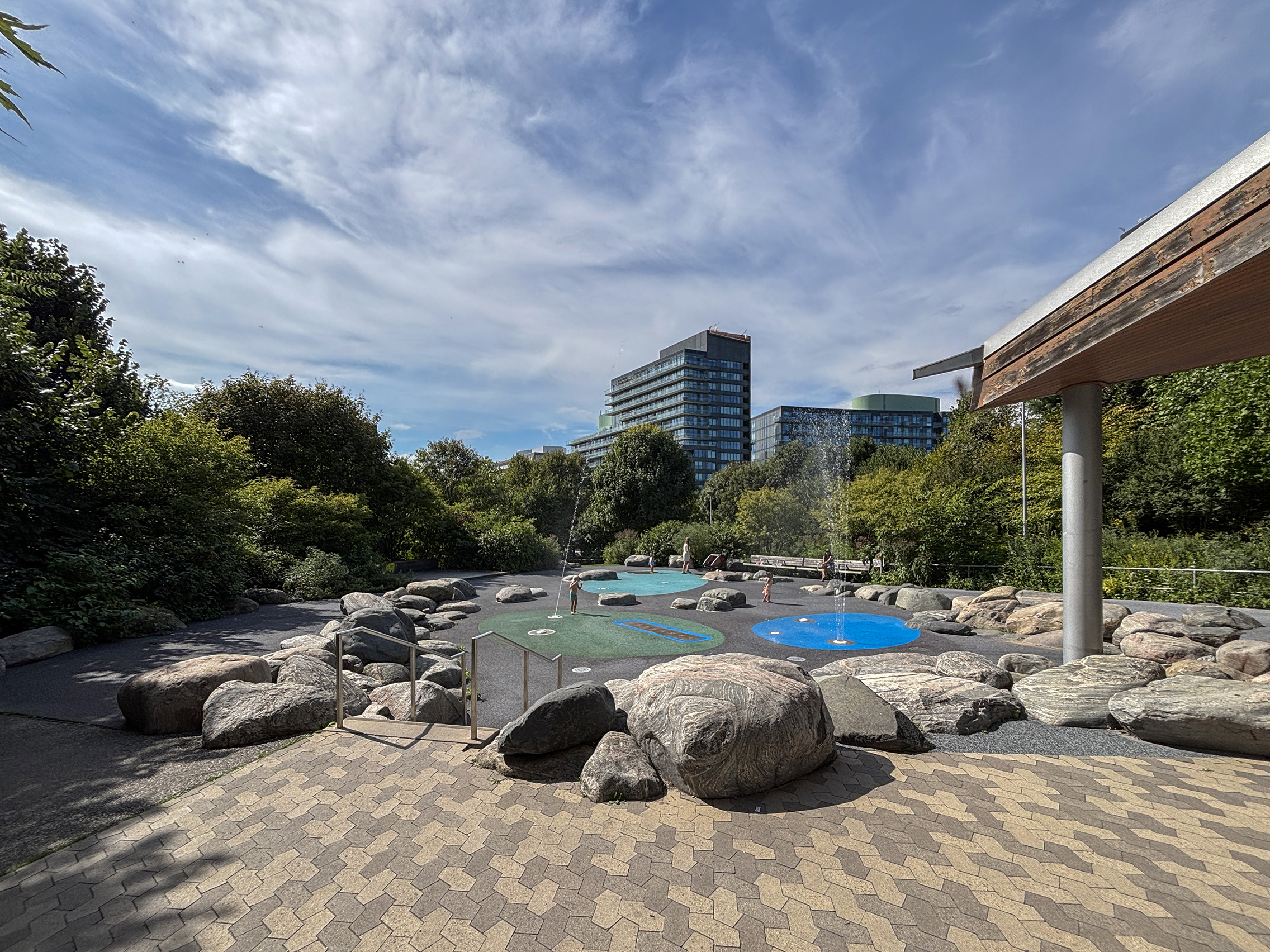
Splash Pad

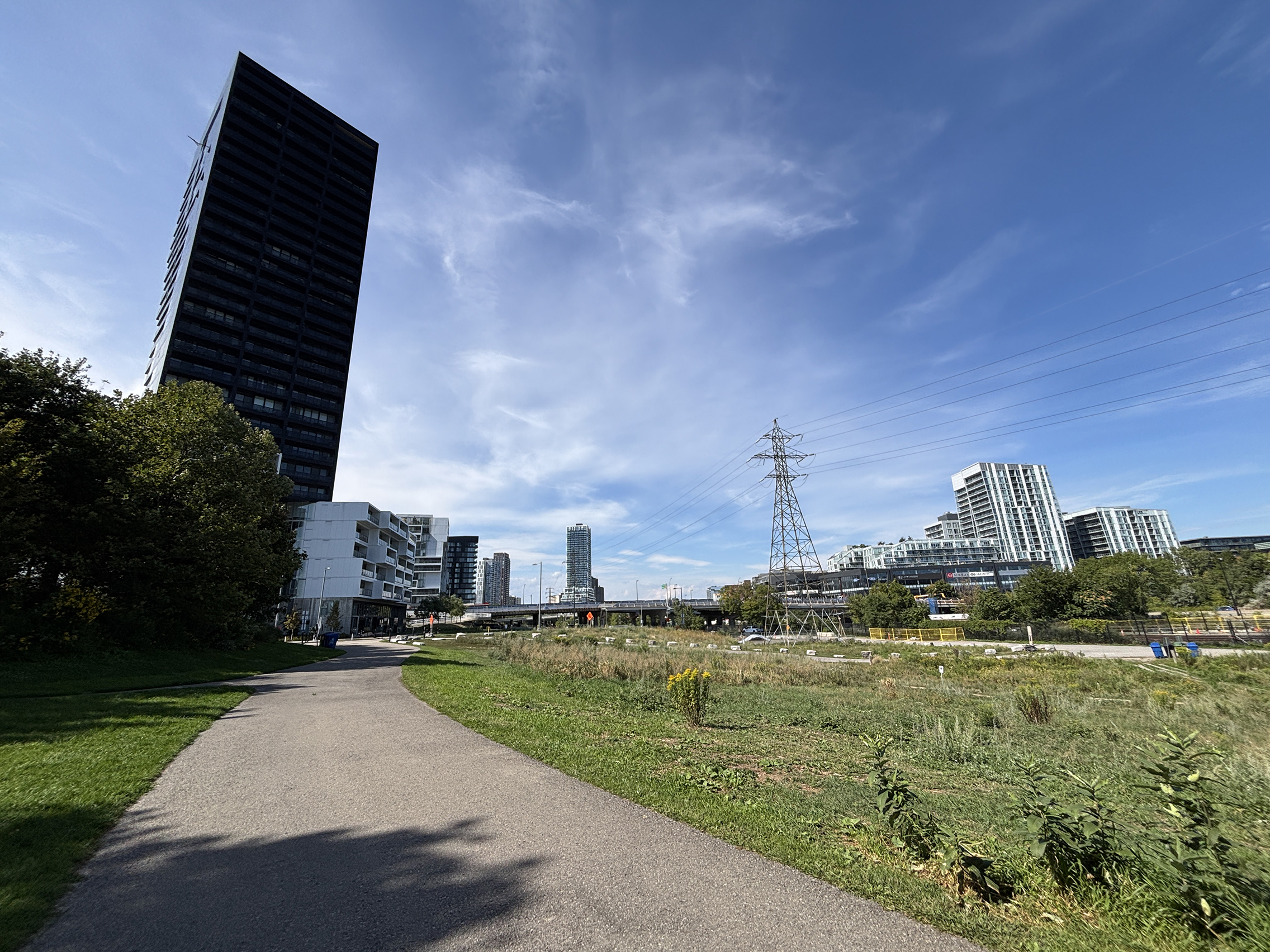
Lowland Prairi

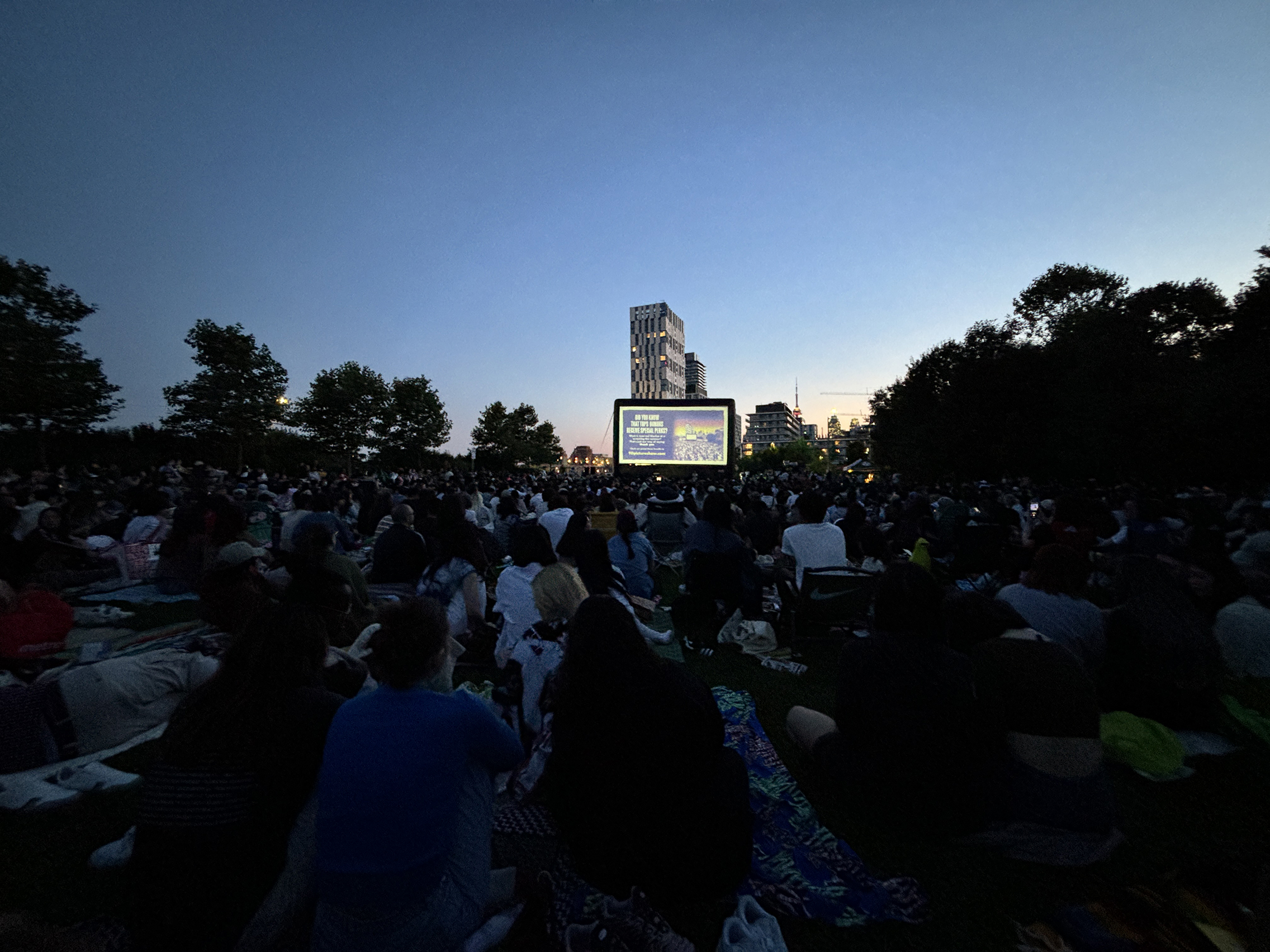
Toronto Picture outdoor show

== See also ==
- 2015 Pan American Games Athletes' Village
