= Front Street (Toronto) =

Thoroughfare in Toronto, Ontario

Coordinates: 43°38′43″N 79°22′55″W

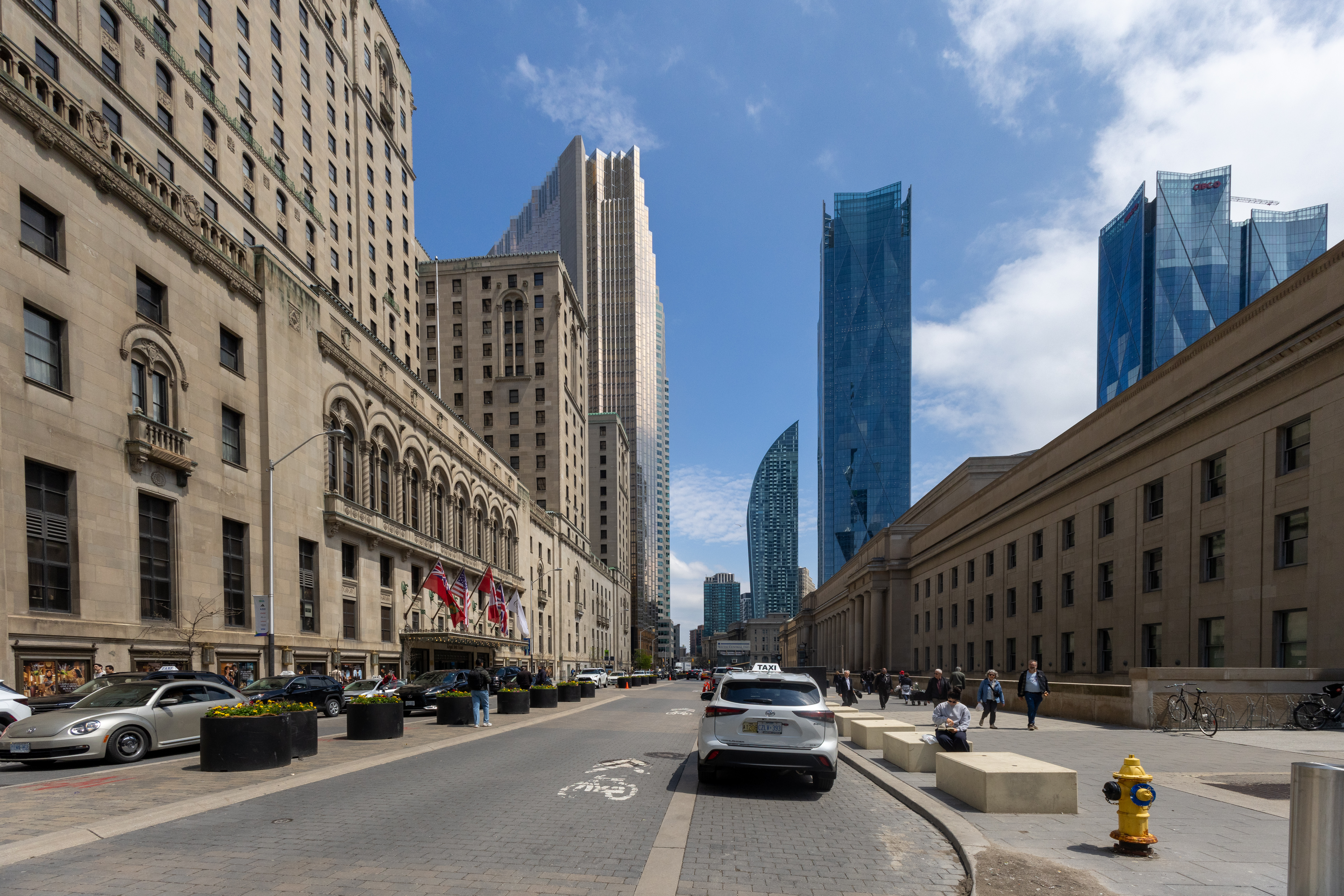
- Front Street looking east outside of Union Station

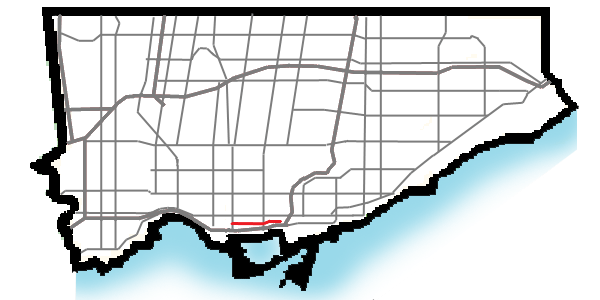
- Front Street (Toronto) in Toronto
- Maintained by: City of Toronto government
- Location: Toronto
- West end: Bathurst Street
- Major junctions: Spadina Avenue; University Avenue; Yonge Street; Jarvis Street; Parliament Street
- East end: Bayview Avenue

Other
Nearby arterial roads in Toronto
← Gardiner Expressway	King Street →

Front Street is an east–west road in Toronto, Ontario, Canada. First laid out in 1796, the street is one of the original streets of the Town of York. The street was laid out along the shoreline of Lake Ontario as it existed during that time. It remains an important street with many important landmarks, including the St. Lawrence Market, Meridian Hall, Union Station, and the Metro Toronto Convention Centre. The eastern section of Front Street, in the West Don Lands, east of Cherry Street, is being rebuilt as a broad tree-lined boulevard, intended to be the pedestrian-friendly commercial spine of the new neighbourhood.

== Description ==
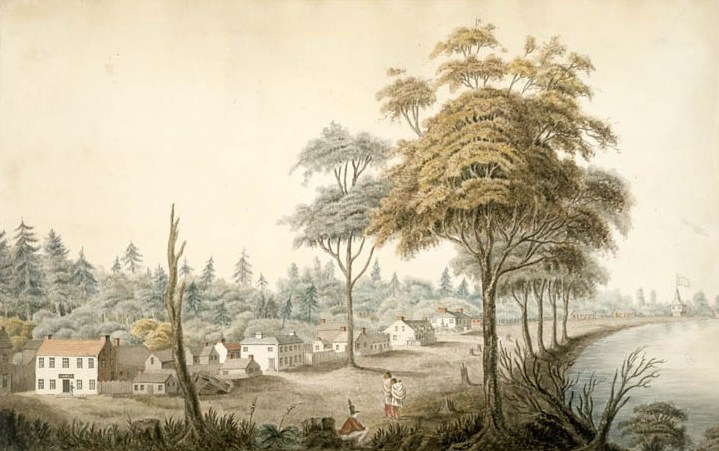
Front Street, 1804

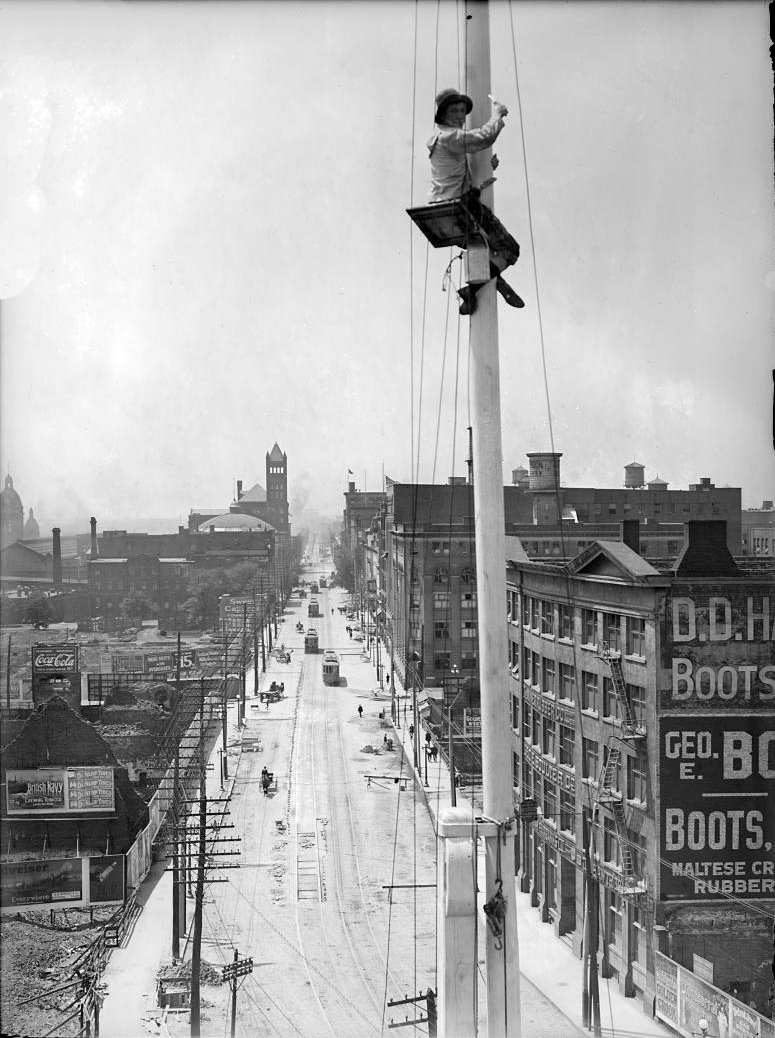
Flagpole painter looking west on Front Street from Yonge Street, 1907. Photo by William James.

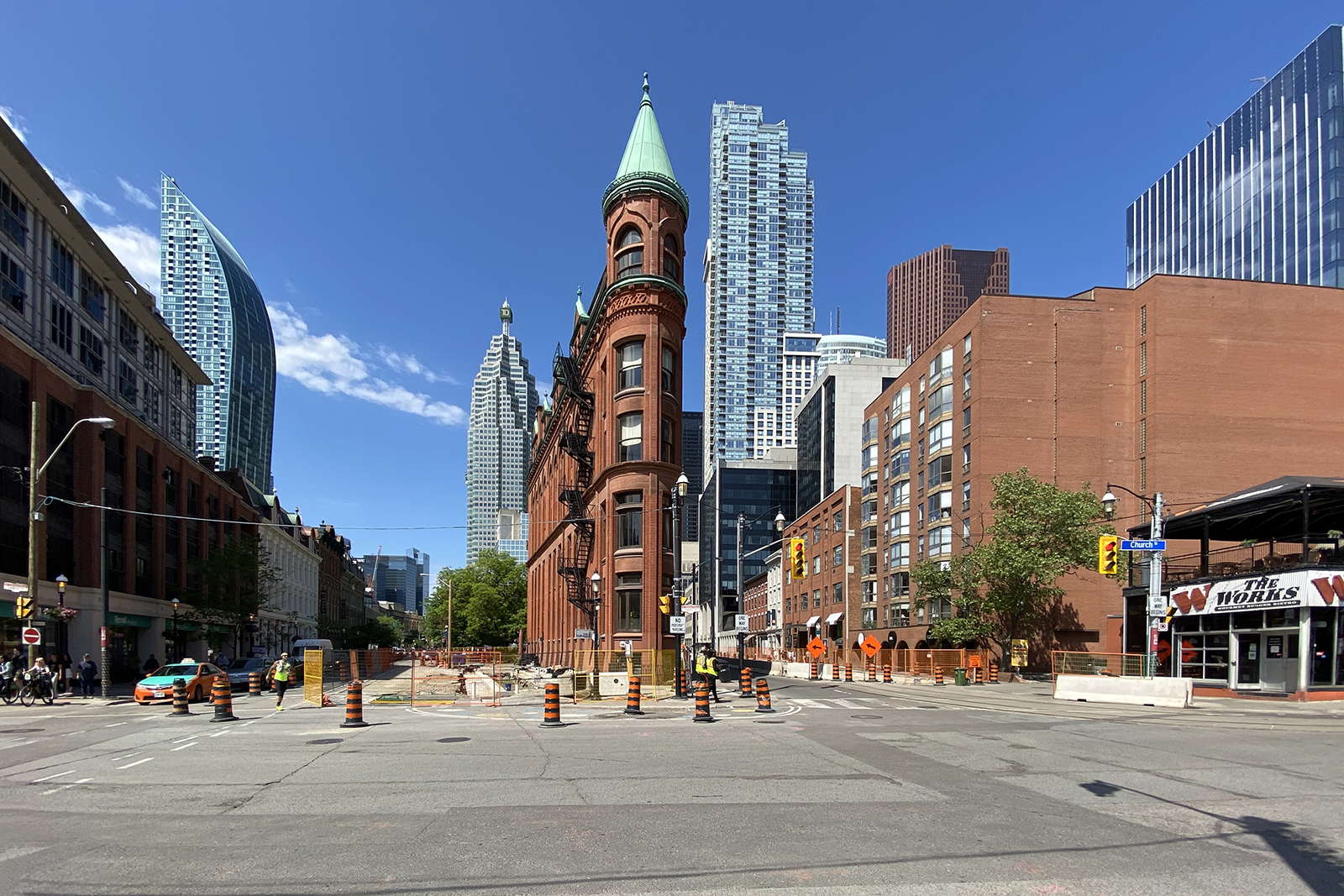
Looking west along Front Street towards the intersection of Front and Church Streets, with the Gooderham Building in the foreground and Brookfield Place behind it

Front Street runs from Bathurst Street in the west, east to Bayview Avenue to the east. From Bathurst Street, the street is four lanes wide. On the south side are the large downtown rail yards. From Bathurst to Spadina, the north side is a mix of residential apartments and commercial development. West of Spadina Avenue, 444 Front St. West was the site of The Globe and Mail's offices for over 40 years until 2017. Front Street diverges from the rail line. Along this stretch, which at one time was industrial with many rail sidings, the street has many high-rise buildings. These are mostly residential with ground and lower floors given to retail and commercial uses. East of Blue Jays Way (the extension of Peter Street south), the area becomes commercial. On the north side of the street are office buildings, including the headquarters for the Canadian Broadcasting Corporation (CBC). Along the south side is a low-rise office building to the north of the Rogers Centre stadium. From John Street east to nearly Simcoe is the Metro Convention Centre. From Simcoe East are a few remnant industrial buildings, repurposed for office and retail uses. 151 Front Street West is a carrier hotel that houses more than a hundred telecommunication companies, as well as the Toronto Internet Exchange.

Between York and Bay Streets, the south side is the Union Station railway and subway station, the north side is the large Fairmont Royal York Hotel and the RBC Bank building. In this stretch, both sides of the street are reserved for parking for cabs and passenger drop-offs, and there is a center divider. East of Bay, the north side is the TD Canada Trust tower, while whole south side from Bay to Yonge is the Dominion Public Building, housing offices of the Government of Canada. The road curves to the north-east here to meet at Yonge. On the north-east corner is the Brookfield Place office complex, which incorporates some heritage buildings along Yonge Street. One of the houses the Hockey Hall of Fame.

East of Yonge Street, the street is for a few blocks a two-lane one-way east street angling further to the north. The corner here is the site of the Sony Centre for the Performing Arts theater. The north side is the Altius Group office building, with ground-floor retail. One block east is the St. Lawrence Centre for the Arts theatre building on the south side, with a park along the north side. Along the south side to the east of the theatre are 19th Century commercial low-rise heritage buildings. At Church Street, the street intersects at an angle with Wellington Street (formerly Market Street). The intersection is notable for the Gooderham Building a wedge-shaped brick building between Wellington and Front. From Church Street, the road continues as a four-lane street of two-way traffic, with a central divider. The north side are recent low-rise condominiums, the south side a collection of 19th-century commercial buildings.

At the intersection of Jarvis Street is the St. Lawrence Market complex. This area was first laid out around 1800 to hold the commercial heart of the Town of York. A public market was first originated in 1803 to serve the Town at this location, the original "Market Square". The large St. Lawrence Market south building incorporates part of the 1845 Toronto City Hall building in its Front Street facade. The north side of the street is the St. Lawrence Market north building, the original market location, which was originally the Market Square.

East of Jarvis Street, the street continues as a four-lane two-way street. This stretch, parallel to King Street, from George to Parliament, is the southern border of the original York town site, although no buildings along this street date from the time of the Town of York. From here east to Parliament Street, the area is mixed retail and commercial, mostly low-rise. The buildings are mostly 20th Century buildings with a few heritage buildings dating back to the second half of the 19th Century.

East of Parliament Street, the street intersects with the Eastern Avenue Extension which crosses over the Don River to connect to the Don Valley Parkway expressway. Front Street itself continues to the east as a two-lane street. The area here is a district in transition. This area was primarily industrial, and was connected to the railways east of Cherry Street. The area is now vacant and partly filled with the new buildings of the West Don Lands development. The area east of Cherry Street to the south was the site of the 2015 Pan American Games Athletes' Village, which will become the Canary District housing development. A new George Brown College residence and a YMCA were built here. The street continues east, although it is under development and closed to traffic. At Bayview, the street ends at the Corktown Common park, once the site of the William Davies Company meat packing factory complex.

== History ==
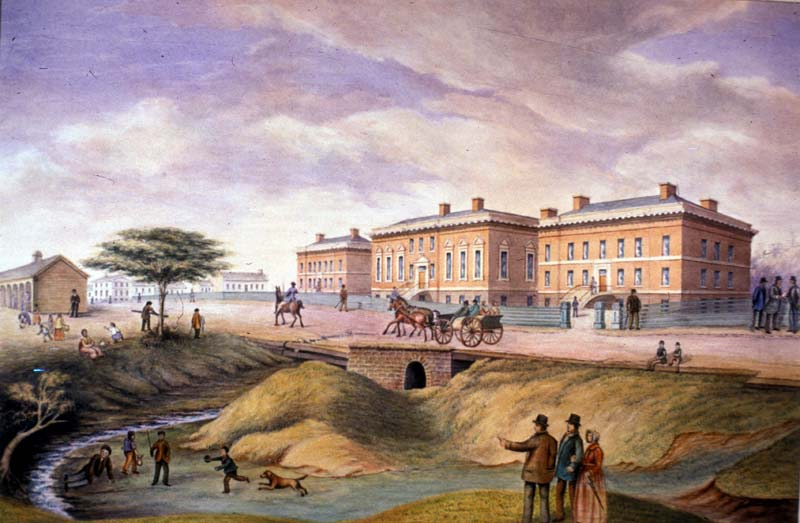
The third Parliament Building in York, built between 1829 and 1832 on Front Street

The original 1796 York town plan, as approved by Lieutenant Governor Simcoe was a ten-block town site west of Taddle Creek, just west of the Don River. This part of the street which would in future become part of today's Front Street, was first named King Street. In the 1797 plan extending the town to the west, Front Street appeared to the west of Yonge, and extended west to York Street. The streets in the original site were changed and the original King Street was changed to Palace Street, and the original Duke Street, one block to the north, became King Street. In 1798, a further enlargement of the plan extended Front Street to the west to Peter Street, interrupted by the mouth of Russell Creek. Russell Creek was filled in by 1842 and the area of the mouth became the site of the third Upper Canada Parliament Buildings. By 1816, Front Street was extended to the east to connect to Palace Street. A stub of Front Street to the east of the bay is shown on an 1834 plan of York. This would align today with Mill Street in the Distillery District. On an 1894 map of Toronto, Palace Street has become part of Front Street, and the street has been extended to the east to the Don River. The Esplanade is shown connected to Mill Street. And in the west, Front Street is extended to Bathurst Street.

A proposal to extend Front Street was made in 1999 as part of efforts to develop the waterfront by the City of Toronto. The plan would have extended the road west to Dufferin Street, adding connections to the Gardiner Expressway. The entire cost of the extension, once estimated at $120 million, grew to $245 million and in May 2008, Toronto Mayor David Miller announced its cancellation and that funds budgeted for the road would go to other projects on the waterfront. While the plan was in development, two local entrepreneurs, Fred Dominelli who later became a city councillor, and Dale Martin, purchased some land on the extension's right-of-way for $280,000. The two had stood to make a profit of nearly $7 million, had the expected expropriation gone through.

== Crossroads ==
- Bayview Avenue
- Parliament Street
- Sherbourne Street
- Jarvis Street
- Church Street
- Yonge Street
- Bay Street
- York Street/University Avenue
- Spadina Avenue
- Bathurst Street
