= 2015 Pan American Games Athletes' Village =

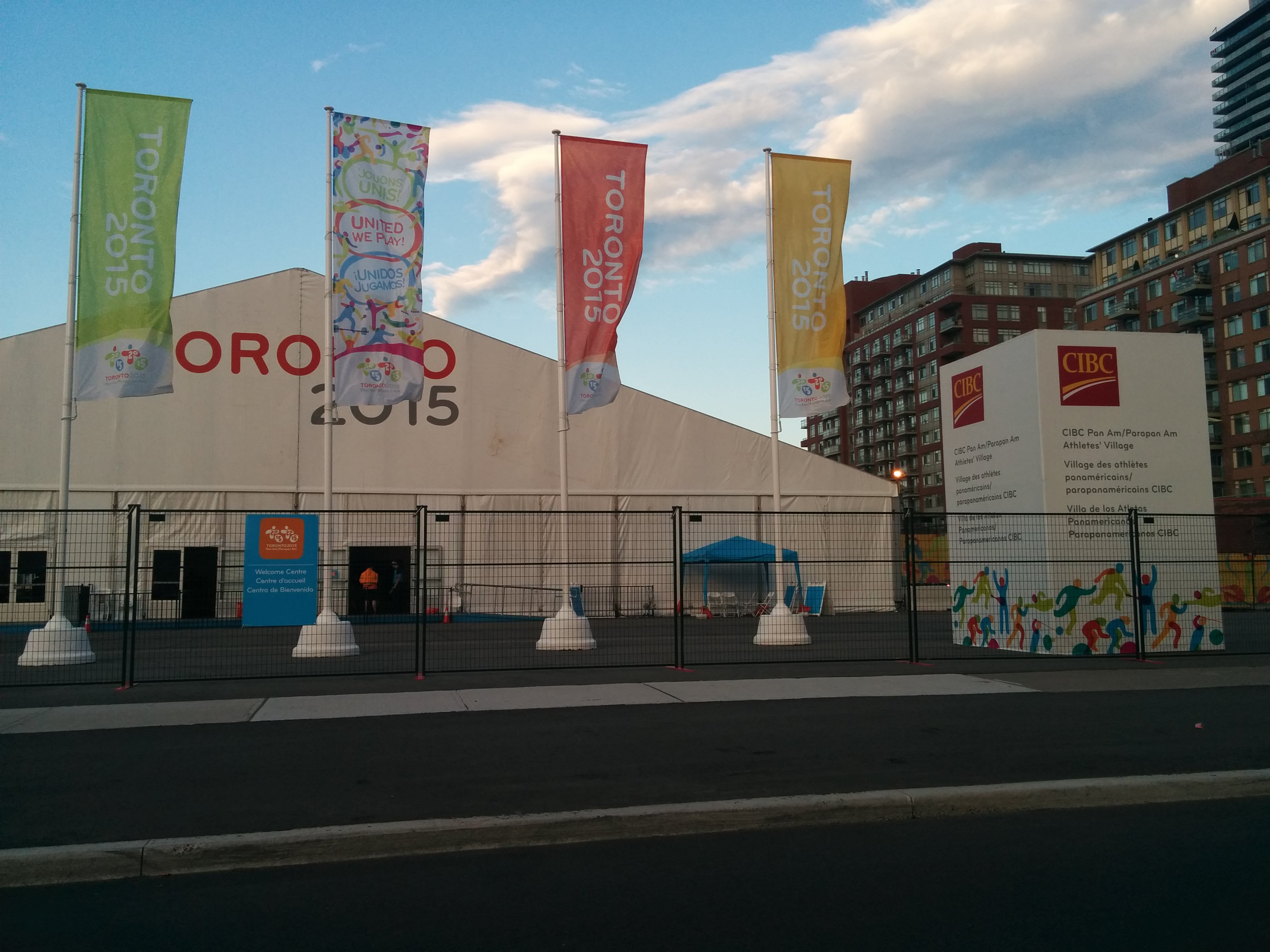
The Welcome Centre of the Pan-Am Athlete's Village

The Athlete's village for the 2015 Pan American Games and 2015 Parapan American Games cost $735 million CAD and had the capacity to hold up to 7,200 athletes and officials. After the games the village was converted to 746 market priced condos, 41 market-priced town homes, 250 affordable-rent apartments, 257 student dormitory units for George Brown College, office and retail units, and a YMCA recreation centre. The Athlete's Village was located in the West Don Lands along Front Street between Bayview Avenue and Cherry Street in Toronto. The development was certified LEED Gold. Five satellite villages (all hotels and university residences) were also used to house athletes that were competing in venues far from the main village.

== Layout ==
Six buildings compose the Athletes Village, five are residential mid-rise buildings and the sixth is a training facility. After the Pan Am/Para Pan Am Games, four residential towers became a Canary District housing development. The fifth became a dormitory for students of nearby George Brown College, and training facility became a YMCA, and serve as a men's hostel. The village was completed in February 2015, and cost $709 million CAD. As well, the village includes the Corktown Common park which was built a year before.

Like the Olympic Villages provided for other games, the Athletes' Village provided in Toronto for the 2015 Pan American Games was a new construction. However, learning a lesson from the Athletes' Village provided for the 2010 Winter Olympic Games in Vancouver, British Columbia, developers decided the units would not be fully completed before athletes moved in. Since the athletes were going to eat in central cafeterias the room that would eventually become the units' kitchens could serve as an additional bedroom. Hardwood, tile and carpet flooring are to be installed after the games are over. Painted concrete floors was seen as more appropriate for housing for athletes, who could mar the surface of more expensive flooring, with spiked shoes or other athletic gear.

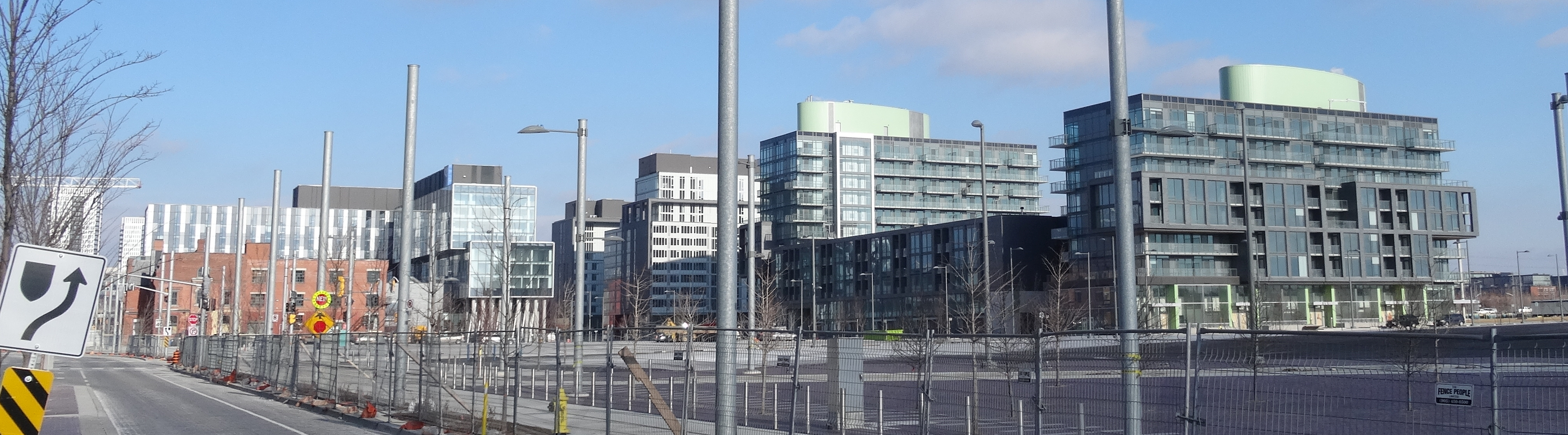
The 2015 Pan American Games Athlete's Village in January 2015

The village is built on the site of former railway and industrial lands, including the William Davies Company, at one time the world's largest pork processing facility. After the meat industry moved out in the 1980s, the area was taken over by government to build a public housing project. The "Ataratiri" project failed in the 1990s, leaving the site mostly vacant for over ten years before the Waterfront Toronto agency was created to speed up the redevelopment of harbour lands in Toronto. The project was fast-tracked once Toronto was awarded the games, changing a twelve-year plan for redevelopment into a six-year plan.

== Satellite villages ==
Village	Location	Sports
Horseshoe Resort	Oro-Medonte	Cycling (mountain biking)
Pinestone Resort	Haliburton	Canoeing (slalom)
Nottawasaga Inn Resort	Alliston	Equestrian; Shooting
McMaster University student residences	Hamilton	Football
Brock University student residences	St. Catharines	Canoeing (sprint); Rowing

== See also ==
- Olympic Village
