= Queens Quay =

Queens Quay or Queen's Quay may refer to:

- Queen's Quay, Belfast, a district in Belfast
- Queens Quay (Toronto), a street in Toronto
  - Queens Quay station, an underground streetcar station in Toronto
  - Queen's Quay Terminal, a building in Toronto
