= Harbour Square Park =

Park in Toronto, Canada

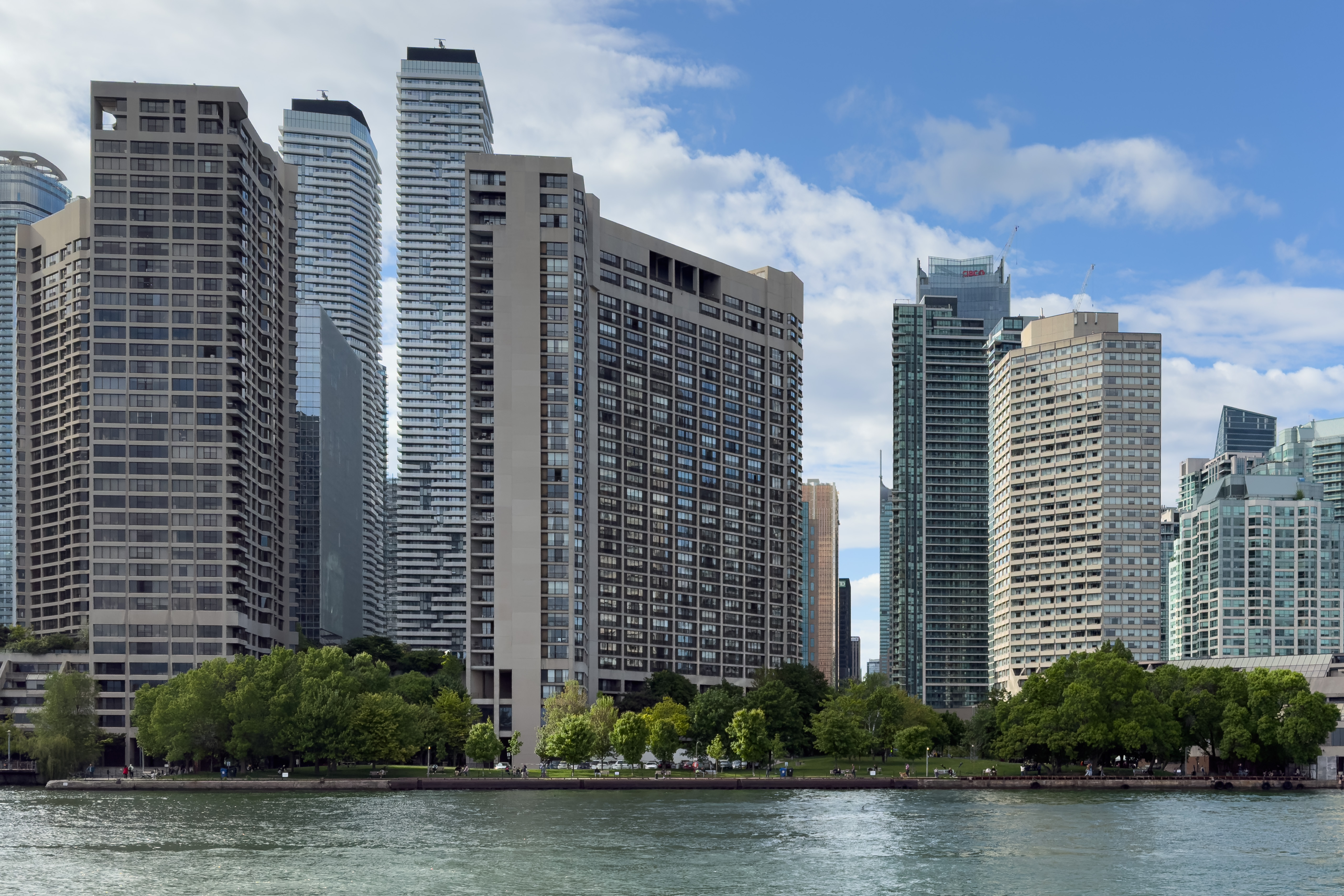
- Harbour Square Park viewed from Toronto Harbour
- Interactive map of Harbour Square Park
- Location: Toronto waterfront
- Coordinates: 43°38′23″N 79°22′35″W
- Operator: Toronto Parks
- Open: 1970s
- Website: Harbour Square Park Lands

Harbour Square Park is a park in Toronto, Ontario, Canada right on the Toronto harbour. It is next to the Harbour Square condos, the Jack Layton Ferry Terminal and the Westin Harbour Castle. It is south of Queens Quay and adjacent to the Queens Quay streetcar station. It contains a boardwalk and a permanent public art installation.

== History ==
The park opened as part of a planned 85 million dollar waterfront project started in 1964, and completed in the early 1970s at the cost of 250 million dollars that would also see the Bay Street shipping slip filled, the Harbour Castle Hilton and Harbour Square condos built. The park is where the ferry terminal used to be before it was shifted to the east side of the park for this redevelopment. This complex and park, a predecessor to the Harbourfront project (today Harbourfront Centre), was one of the first redevelopments of the waterfront, after its deindustrialization. The Park was designed by Fleisher Ridout Partnership Inc., Landscape Architects.

Development of the site was governed by a tripartite agreement between Campeau Corporation, the Toronto Harbour Commission, and the City of Toronto. The development evoked "vociferous" criticism, based on size and isolation of the water's edge.

In 2014, trees were planted in memory of the victims of the Khojaly massacre.

== Public art ==
The Sundial Folly is a concrete sphere that you can go inside. It was created by John Fung and Paul Figueiredo and installed in 1995.

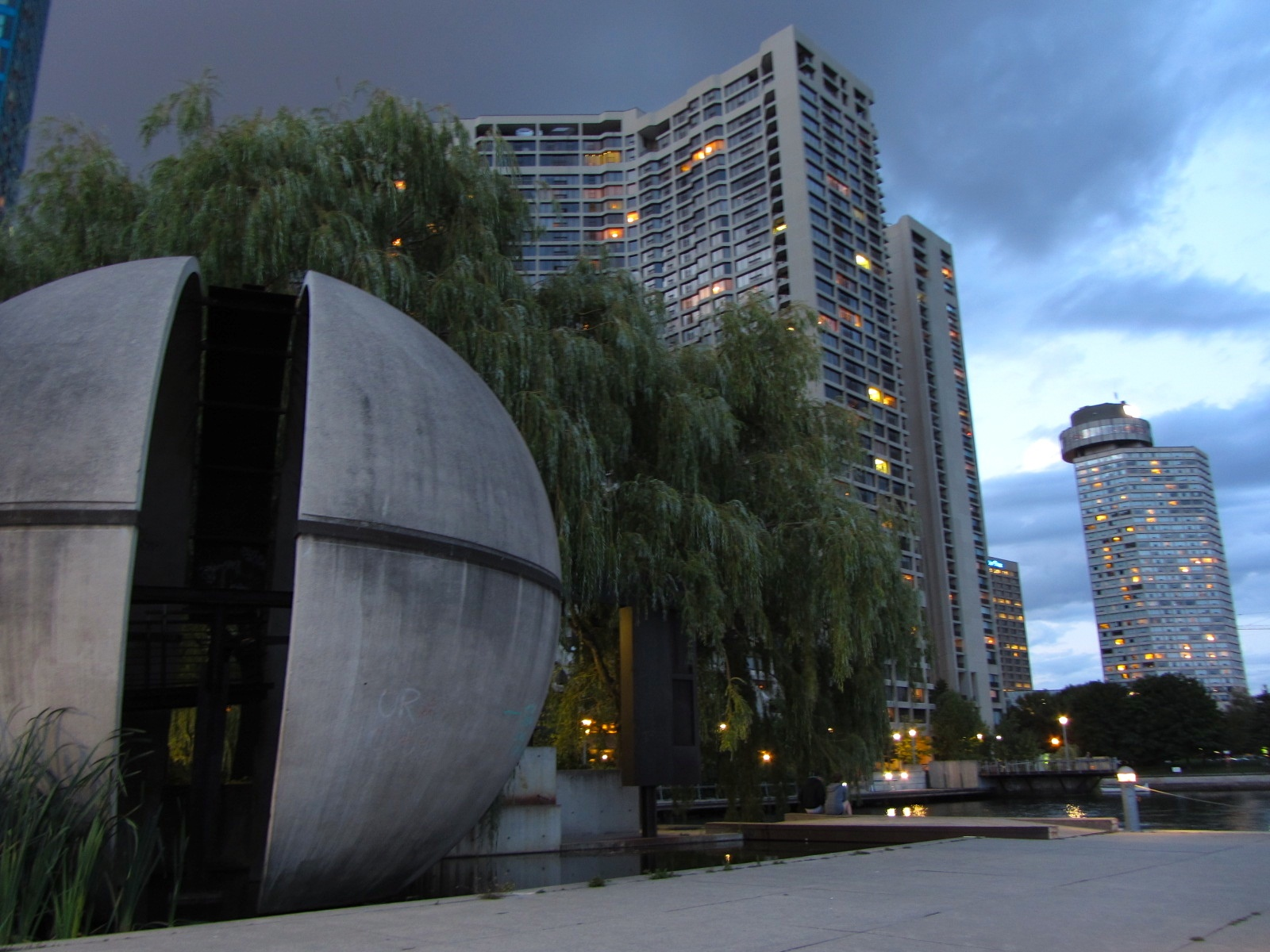
The Sundial Folly on the boardwalk in Harbour Square Park. Harbour Square condos, One Yonge Street, and the Westin Harbour Castle can be seen in the background (left to right).

== Location ==
The park is located near the foot of Bay Street, just south of Queens Quay.
