= Queens Quay (Toronto) =

Street in the Harbourfront neighbourhood of Toronto, Canada

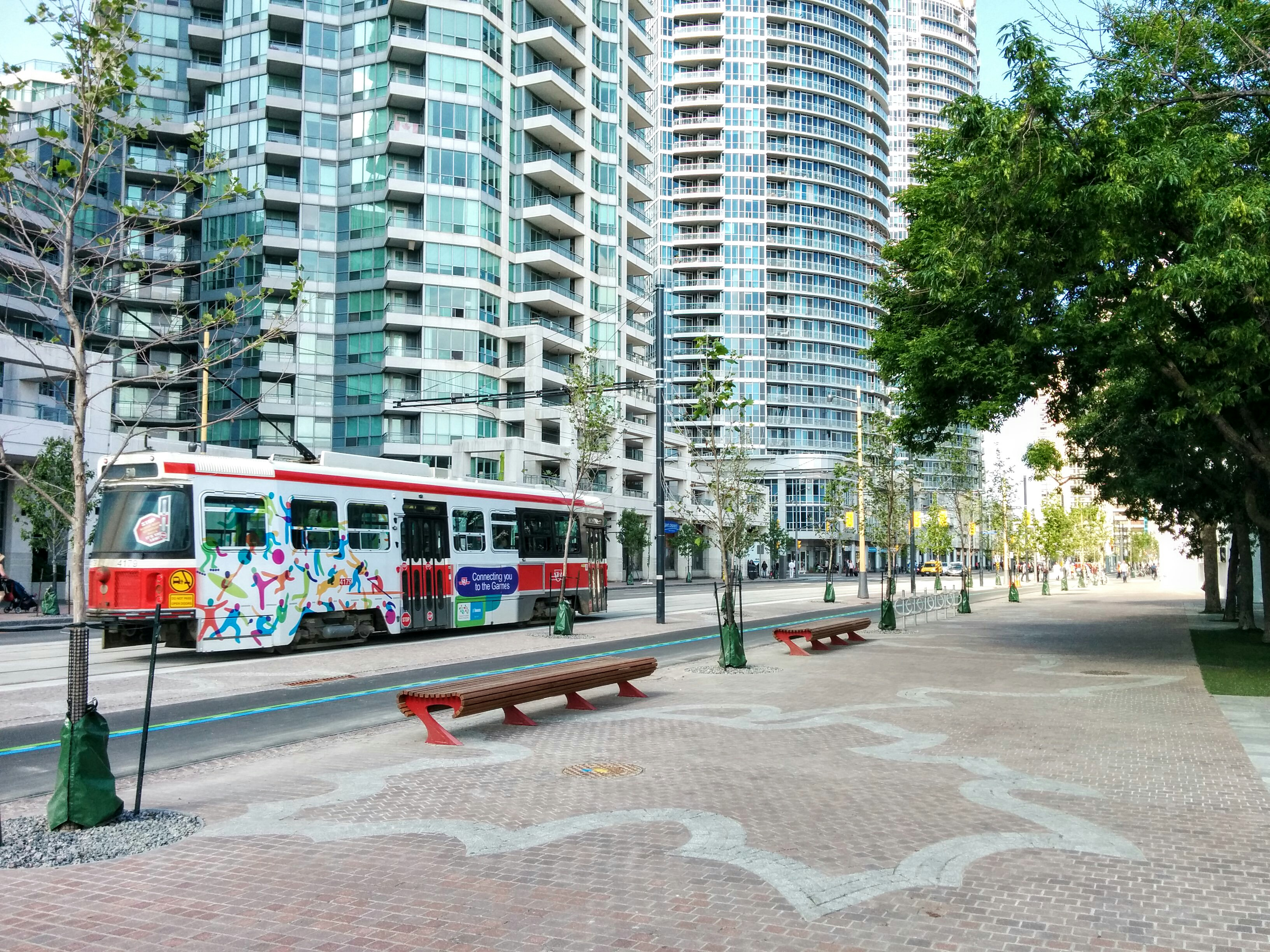
- Looking east down Queens Quay, next to Ann Tindal Park.
- Location: Toronto
- West end: Stadium Road
- East end: Parliament St

Other
Nearby arterial roads in Toronto
Lake Shore Boulevard →

Queens Quay is a prominent street in the Harbourfront neighbourhood of Toronto, Ontario, Canada. The street was originally commercial in nature due to the many working piers along the waterfront; parts of it have been extensively rebuilt in since the 1970s with parks, condominiums, retail, as well as institutional and cultural development.

== History ==
The road supplanted both Front Street and Lake Shore Boulevard as the most southerly east–west corridor in the city when it was created on reclaimed land in the inner harbour. Sometime after 1919 to the early 1920s the inner harbour was filled in and new slips were created.

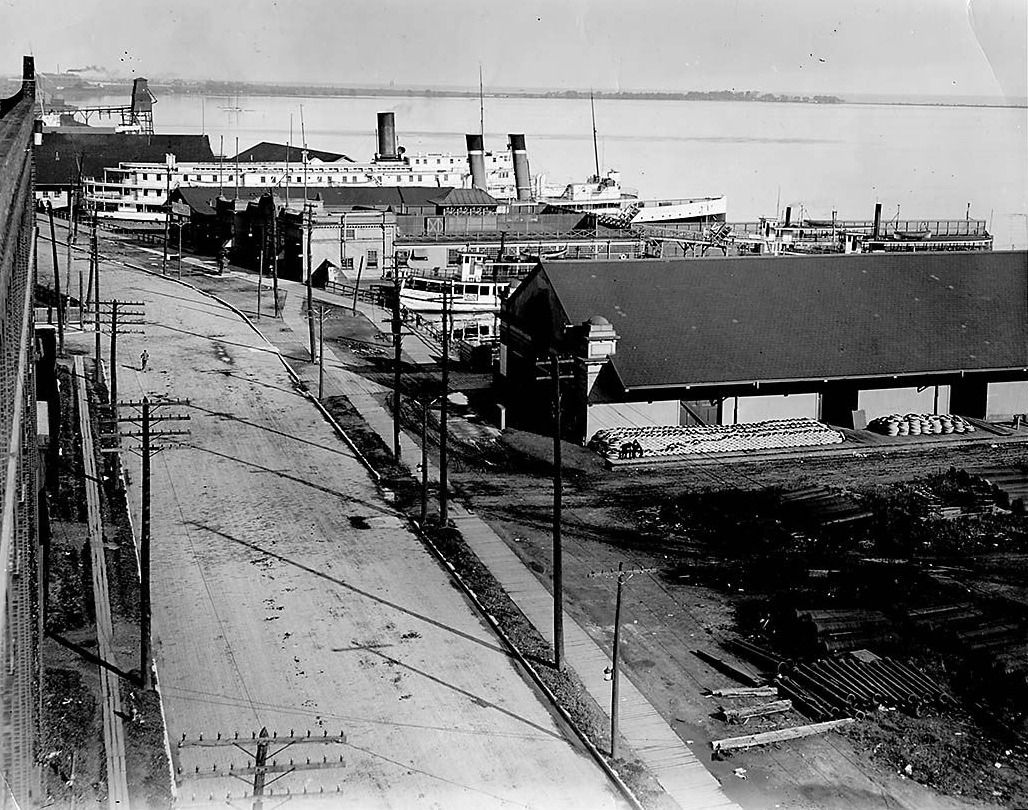
Queens Quay in 1910

Queens Quay continues to go through a significant transformation. Originally, it served as an access road for the various ports and slips in the inner harbour. The street between Yonge Street and Parliament Street was home to storage buildings devoted to trade on the Saint Lawrence Seaway, major industries such as the Redpath Sugar Refinery and Victory Mills, as well as small commercial enterprises. However, the mainly industrial uses along Queens Quay were slowly replaced by commercial and residential uses, mainly high-rise condominiums. Between 1975 and 1979, a cluster of large, concrete towers were erected at the foot of Bay Street, south of Queens Quay; these included the Westin Harbour Castle and Harbour Square. In 1990, the 40-storey York Quay towers were built and remain the tallest buildings on Queens Quay. The scale and density of these and subsequent high-rise development along Queens Quay were criticized for blocking the lake and failing to provide a welcoming realm for visitors. In 1997 City School (Toronto) relocated to 635 Queens Quay West. In 1999, the Toronto Transit Commission opened a dedicated streetcar right-of-way in the median from Bay Street to Bathurst Street.

In 2001, the city planners set out to improve Queens Quay by reclaiming public space for pedestrians and cyclists. This resulted in the Waterfront Toronto Central Waterfront Public Realm International Design Competition, which was completed in 2006. In August 2006, the city closed the two eastbound lanes, replacing them with bike lanes as part of the Martin Goodman Trail and additional pedestrian space. The experiment resulted in an improved public realm and more visitors to the overall waterfront area.

In 2009, Waterfront Toronto announced its plans to turn Queens Quay into a grand lakefront boulevard by placing streetcar lanes in the centre, traffic only on the north side and a pedestrian-focused space on the south side. The plan would restrict Queen's Quay to two traffic lanes, on the north side of the streetcar tracks, similar to the design of the 2006 experiment. Additionally, the plan calls for the beautification and extension of the Harbourfront streetcar line along Queen's Quay East between Yonge and Cherry Street. The transit right-of-way will be grass-covered.

In 2013 Ontario Square and Canada Square opened. The former is an open public space and the latter a green area. Both replace the former parking lot, which is now underground.

== Transportation ==
=== Streetcars and Street Layout ===
Queens Quay West is served by two TTC Streetcar routes, operating on a dedicated right-of-way (ROW): 509 Harbourfront and 510 Spadina both originate at Union Station and run south in a tunnel under Bay Street to serve Queens Quay station. Streetcars then emerge onto the Queens Quay ROW to continue westward. At Lower Spadina Avenue, the 510 turns north and heads towards Spadina station while the 509 continues west, bound for Exhibition Loop.

Originally, Queens Quay Station was planned as an underground station in front of the Westin Harbour Castle Hotel and the Jack Layton Ferry Terminal, with underground access to the hotel. This plan was cancelled when the hotel's management declined to contribute to construction costs, and in 1990 the current station was opened instead. Streetcars previously operated in a dedicated ROW in the central median of Queens Quay West, with 2 general traffic lanes in each direction, running either side of the ROW. The street, between the Toronto Music Garden (west of the intersection with Lower Spadina Avenue) and the Bay Street tunnel portal, was re-built and re-opened in 2015 featuring a new layout (north to south):

- A north-side pedestrian sidewalk
- Two general traffic lanes, plus turning lanes at major intersections
- A new dedicated streetcar ROW
- An extension of the Martin Goodman multi-use trail, effectively adding bicycle lanes in both directions
- A south-side pedestrian sidewalk

With the development of former industrial lands on Queens Quay East into numerous residential neighbourhoods, a college campus, and various commercial uses in the 2010s and 2020s, planning progressed to extend the streetcar system east in a similar street rebuild of Queens Quay East, to better match the new land use and meet demand for higher-order transit. Bus services and infrastructure in the area also evolved considerably during this period, with dedicated, red-painted bus lanes spanning much of the street between Bay Street and Parliament Street. Numerous new services were added while others were re-routed:

=== Bus services ===
- 114 Queens Quay East travels south from Union Station along Bay Street before running the entire length of Queens Quay East to Parliament Street. It then follows Lake Shore Boulevard, Cherry Street, and Commissioners Street before terminating past Carlaw Avenue at the TTC Lakeshore Garage.
- 65 Parliament and 365 Parliament Blue Night operate from the George Brown Waterfront Campus at Lower Sherbourne Street/Dockside Drive to Parliament Street, and onwards to Castle Frank Station.
- The seasonal 202 Cherry Beach operates from Bay Street to Parliament Street and onwards to Cherry Beach via Lake Shore Boulevard and Cherry Street.
- The 75 Sherbourne runs west from Lower Sherbourne to Jarvis Street as part of its turnaround loop.
- 320 Yonge Blue Night runs west from Bay Street to Yonge Street as part of its turnaround loop.

=== Previous bus services ===
- The southern leg of route 19 Bay ran from Union Station to the George Brown Waterfront campus via Bay Street and Queens Quay. This service was replaced by routes 114 and 202 in 2024.
- 72C Pape ran from Union Station to Pape Station via Bay Street, Queens Quay, Lake Shore Boulevard, Cherry Street, Commissioners Street, Carlaw Avenue and Pape Avenue. As of 2024, consolidated 72 Pape service terminates at the intersection of Saulter Street and Commissioners Street, where it interfaces with route 114.

=== Other services ===
The Billy Bishop Airport shuttle connects the Airport (which is accessed via Eireann Quay at the western end of Queens Quay) to Union Station and the Fairmont Royal York hotel. While this service has no fixed routing and no intermediate stops, it often runs along Queens Quay West between York Street and Bathurst Street.

== Landmarks ==
Landmark	Cross street	Notes	Image
Little Norway Park	Bathurst		
Canada Malting Silos	Bathurst	Storage silos abandoned since the 1980s; germination and kiln buildings demolished 2010	
Toronto Music Garden	Spadina		
Walter Carsen Centre	Spadina	headquarters of the National Ballet of Canada	
Empire Sandy	Spadina		
HTO Park	Spadina		
Toronto Waterfront WaveDecks	Spadina, Rees, Lower Simcoe		
Harbourfront Centre	Lower Simcoe	a cultural centre built by the federal government as part of the Harbourfront Park development	
Queen's Quay Terminal	York	Built in 1926 as a cold storage warehouse facility turned into condos in the 1980s	
Queens Quay station	Bay	Underground LRT station	
Westin Harbour Castle Hotel	Bay	Built in 1975 as Harbour Castle Hilton and became a Westin hotel in 1987	
World Trade Centre	Yonge		
Captain John's Harbour Boat Restaurant (1975–2015)	Yonge	Restaurant on a permanently docked boat (Restaurant closed 2011 and ship was removed from dock on May 28, 2015, for recycling in Port Colborne, Ontario)	
One Yonge Street	Yonge	The former Toronto Star headquarters from 1971 to 2022.	
Redpath Sugar Refinery	Jarvis	Last active industrial site along the quay	
The Guvernment	Jarvis	Night club opened in 1980s and closed 2015; demolition began in 2015 as property sold to condo developer Daniels Corporation	
Sugar Beach	Jarvis		
Corus Quay	Jarvis	Home of Corus Entertainment and first major development in the East Bayfront District	
Victory Soya Mills Silos (Central Soya Mills)	Parliament	Built 1943 and abandoned industrial silos since 1991; designated historic site	

== Quays and slips along Queens Quay ==
Listed from west to east

- Bathurst Quay (Éireann Quay) - see Ireland Park and Canada Malting Silos
- Spadina Quay
- Peter Street Slip
- Maple Leaf Quays - former site of Maple Leaf Mills Silos
- Rees Street Slip
- John Street Quay
- Simcoe Street Slip
- York Quay
- York Street Slip
- Harbour Square
- Yonge Street Slip
- Pier 27
- Jarvis Street Slip - now Corus Quay
- Redpath Slip
- Parliament Street Slip
