= The City School =

City School can refer to:

- The City School (Pakistan) in Pakistan
- City School (Vancouver), an alternative program in King George Secondary School in Vancouver, British Columbia, Canada
- City School (Toronto), Canada
- The City School (Sheffield), former name of Outwood Academy City
