= Jack Layton Ferry Terminal =

Ferry terminal in Toronto, Ontario, Canada

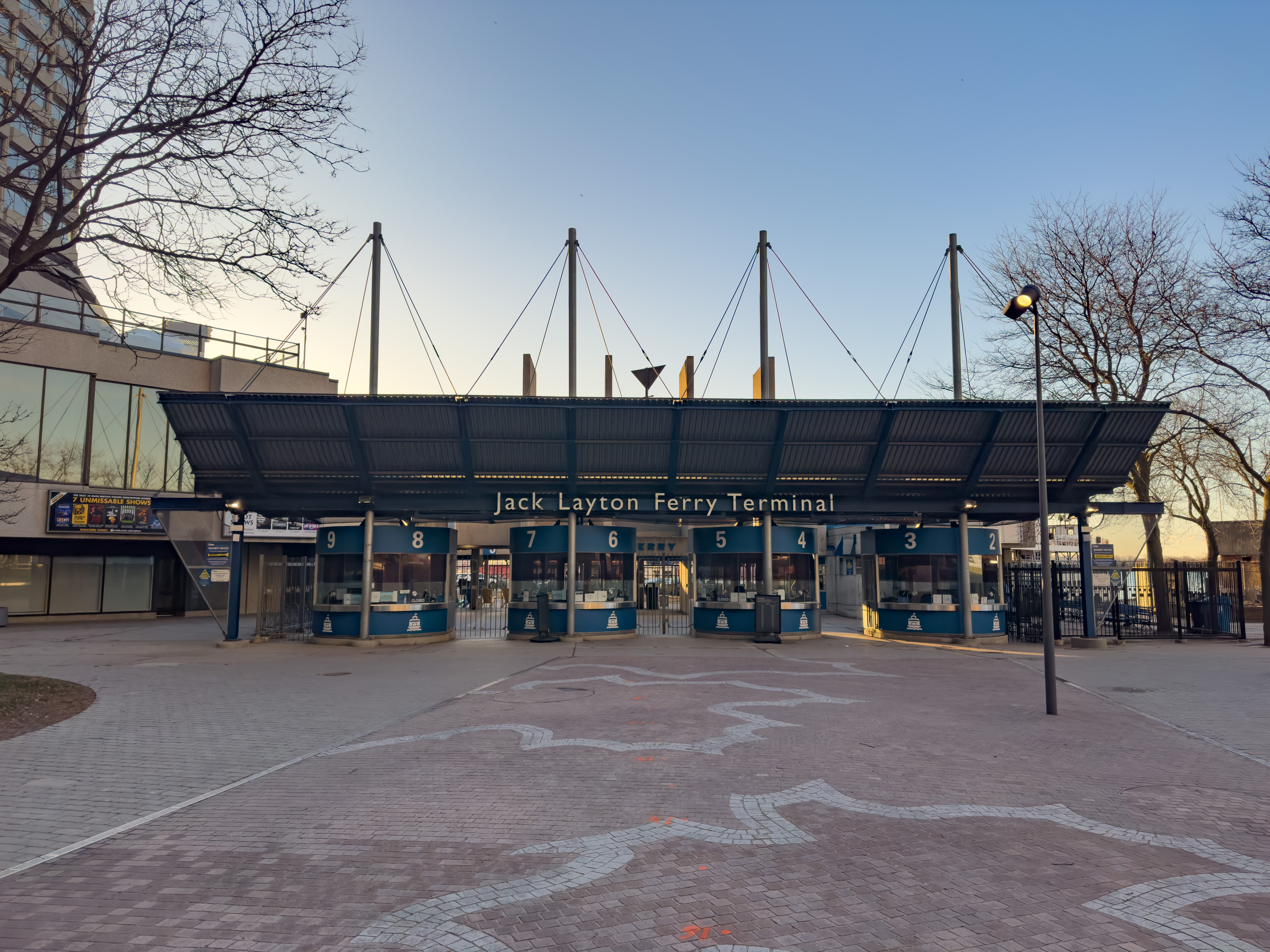
- Jack Layton Ferry Terminal main passenger gates

General information
- Location: 9 Queens Quay West; Toronto, Ontario; Canada
- Coordinates: 43°38′25″N 79°22′31″W
- Owner: City of Toronto
- Operator: Toronto Ferry Company (1892–1926); Toronto Transit Commission (1926–1961); Toronto Parks, Forestry and Recreation Division (1961–present)
- Line: Toronto Island ferries
- Connections: at Queens Quay; TTC buses

Construction
- Accessible: Yes

Other information
- Website: City of Toronto webpage

History
- Opened: 19th century
- Rebuilt: 1972

Passengers
- 2009: 1.2 million per year

Services
Preceding station	Toronto Island ferries	Following station
Terminus	Ward's Island Ferry	Ward's Island Terminus
Terminus	Centre Island Ferry	Centre Island Terminus
Terminus	Hanlan's Point Ferry	Hanlan's Point Terminus
Location

The Jack Layton Ferry Terminal (formerly called the Toronto Island Ferry Docks) is the ferry slip for Toronto Island ferries operated by the City of Toronto Parks, Forestry and Recreation Division. Three ferry routes provide transportation between mainland Toronto and Centre Island, Hanlan's Point and Ward's Island in the Toronto Islands, with levels of service to each destination differing depending on time of year. The terminal is located in the Toronto Harbour, behind the Westin Harbour Castle Hotel and adjacent to Harbour Square Park. It is south of Bay Street and Queens Quay in Toronto, Ontario, Canada.

The Toronto Island Ferry Docks were renamed the Jack Layton Ferry Terminal in 2013 to honour Jack Layton, who served as a Toronto city councillor, and was later leader of the New Democratic Party (NDP) and leader of the Official Opposition.

== History ==
The main departure point from the city to the Island has been at the foot of Bay Street since the 19th century.

=== First terminal location (19th century–1918) ===
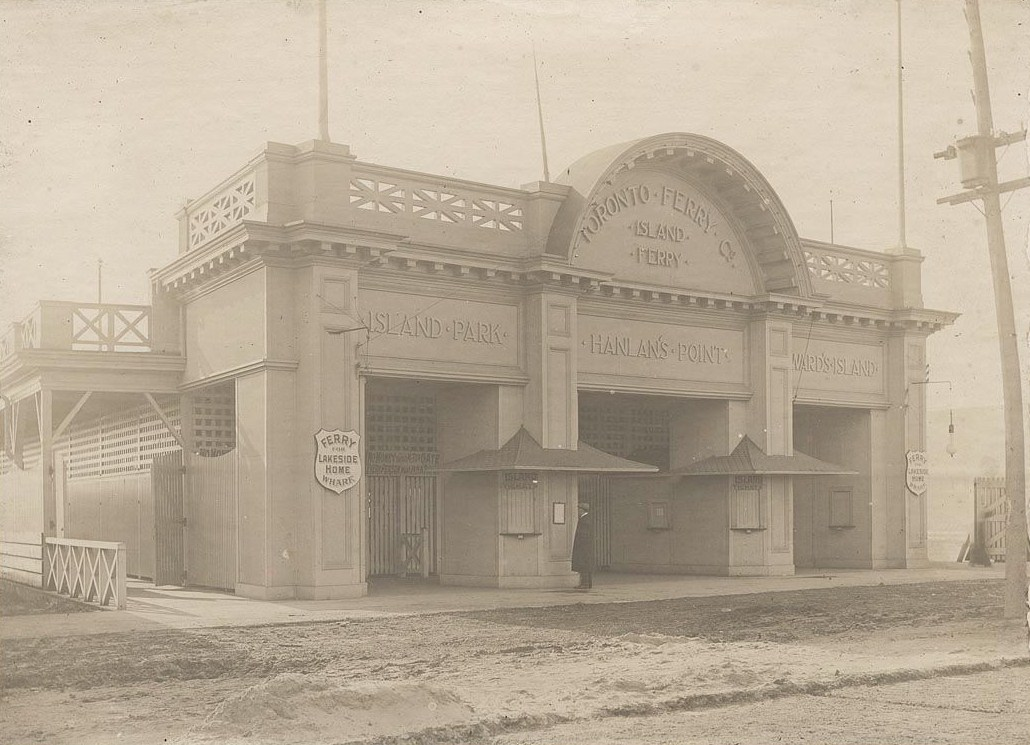
The first ferry terminal at the Toronto Harbour, c. 1899.

The original terminal was located on the east side of the Toronto Harbour Commission Building at Bay and Harbour Streets. The terminal in the picture was destroyed by fire in 1907 and was rebuilt. A steamship terminal and berth areas was added to the east side. The site is now filled in and occupied by a parking lot.

=== Second terminal location (1918–1972) ===
When the infilling of the harbour took place after 1918 the docks moved to Queen's Quay west of Bay Street. It had a waiting room and was heated in the wintertime. This terminal would be there until it was demolished during the redevelopment of the Toronto waterfront that began in the 1960s when Leslie Marlow's company, Marvo Construction Company got the approvals for the site from the Ontario Municipal Board in late 1964. Marlow sold his rights to the development to Robert Campeau's group in the late 1960s, and they went on to finish the development that included the Harbour Square condos on the site of the second terminal.

=== Third terminal location (1972–present) ===
The third terminal was inaugurated in January 1972, situated approximately 100 meters to the east of the previous terminal. This new terminal was an integral component of a comprehensive waterfront development project initiated in 1964, with an initial budget of 85 million dollars. The project culminated in the early 1970s, resulting in the construction of the Harbour Castle Hilton and Harbour Square condominiums, as well as the filling in of the Bay Street shipping slip. The project's total cost amounted to 250 million dollars.

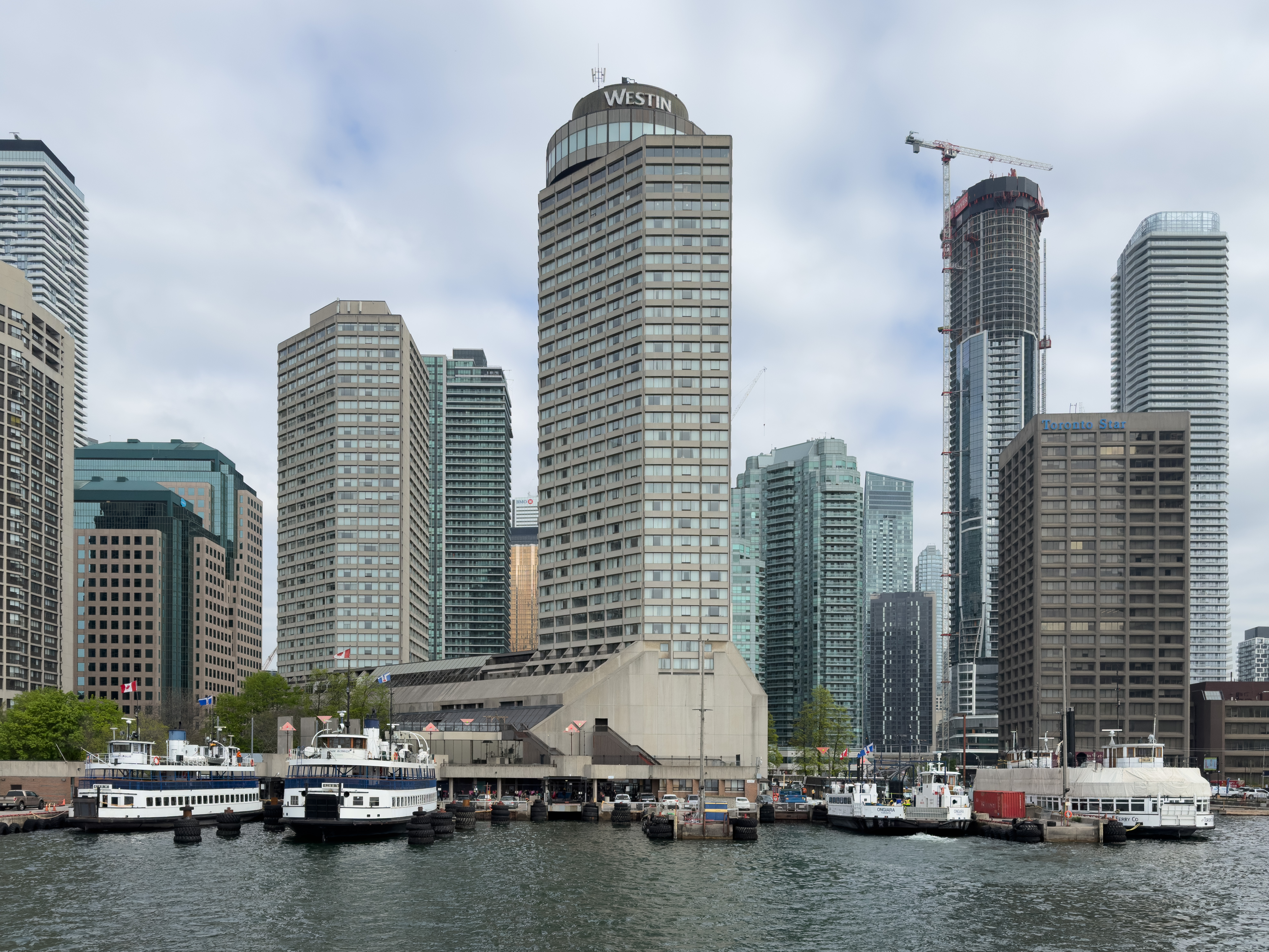
The ferry docks viewed from the harbour

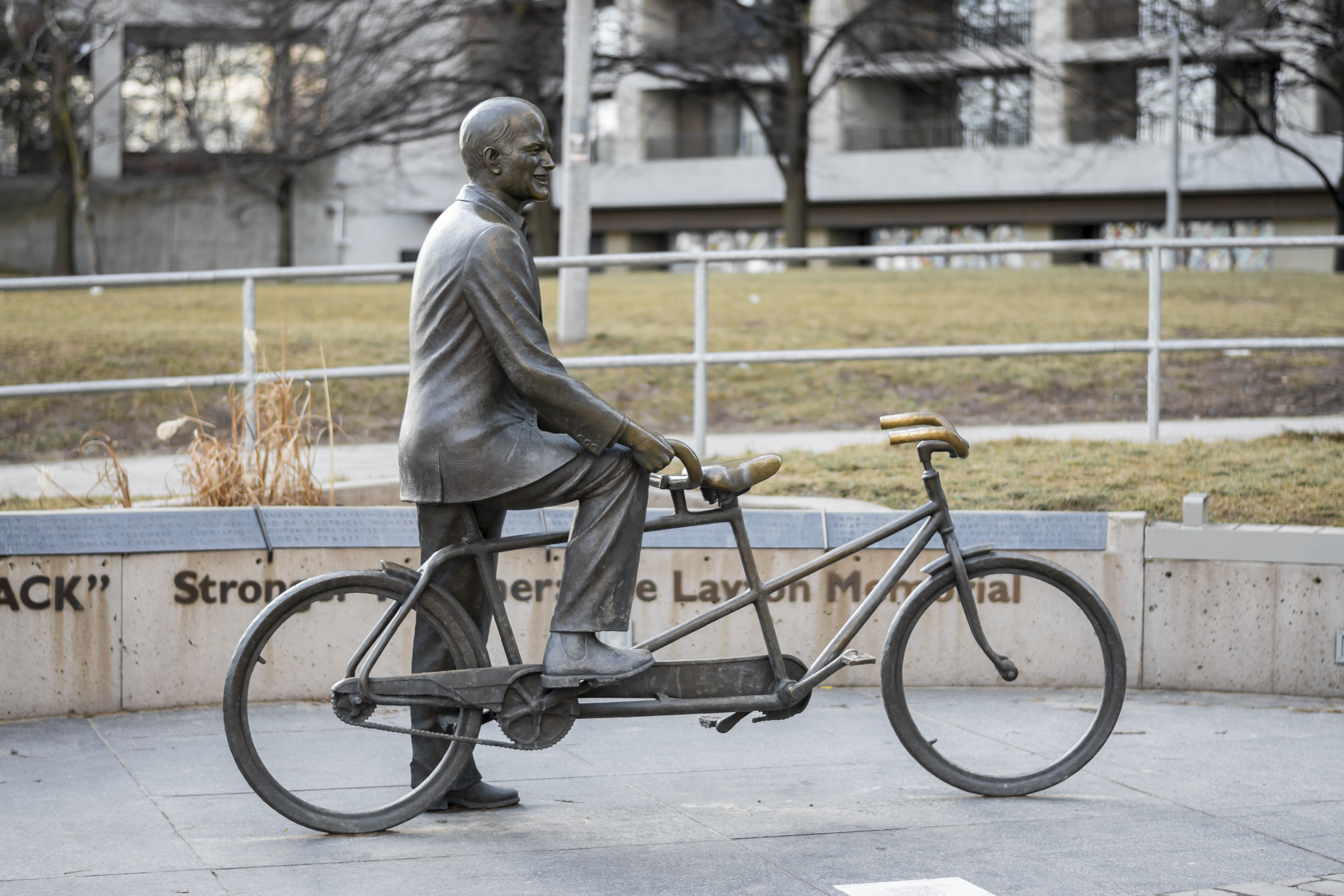
Statue of Jack Layton at the terminal. The terminal was named in honour of Layton in 2012.

The new terminal was constructed at a cost of CA$519,000. However, unlike its predecessor, it lacked a waiting room due to the temporary suspension of ferry operations during the winter months. Consequently, it encountered significant crowding issues during its inaugural season. Metro Parks Commissioner Tommy Thompson expressed dissatisfaction with the terminal's location and layout.

To address the access to Bay Street, a new service road/pedestrian walkway was constructed, incurring a cost of approximately one million dollars for Metro and the City of Toronto. This road was completed after the terminal's opening in 1972 and served the condominium-hotel complex surrounding the terminal.

Minor upgrades have been implemented to replace the original ticket booths with newer and larger ones situated north of the original entrance, partially covered by a canopy.

In 2012, the Toronto City Council voted unanimously to rename the terminal in honour of the late Jack Layton, who served as a Toronto city councillor, and led the NDP and Official Opposition. In 2013, on the second anniversary of Layton's death, the terminal was formally renamed and a bronze statue of Layton riding on a tandem bicycle was installed at the site.

=== New Terminal ===
In 2015, a winning design was announced for a renovation and redesign of the terminal building. The first phase of construction is expected to be complete in April, 2019.

== Usage ==
There is an estimated 1.2 million passengers to the station per year, mostly in the summer months.

The three larger ferries are stored here during the winter months. The ferries' exposed decks are covered by a white tarp.

== See also ==
- Queens Quay station
- Toronto Ferry Company
