= Union station (TTC) =

Toronto subway station

Union
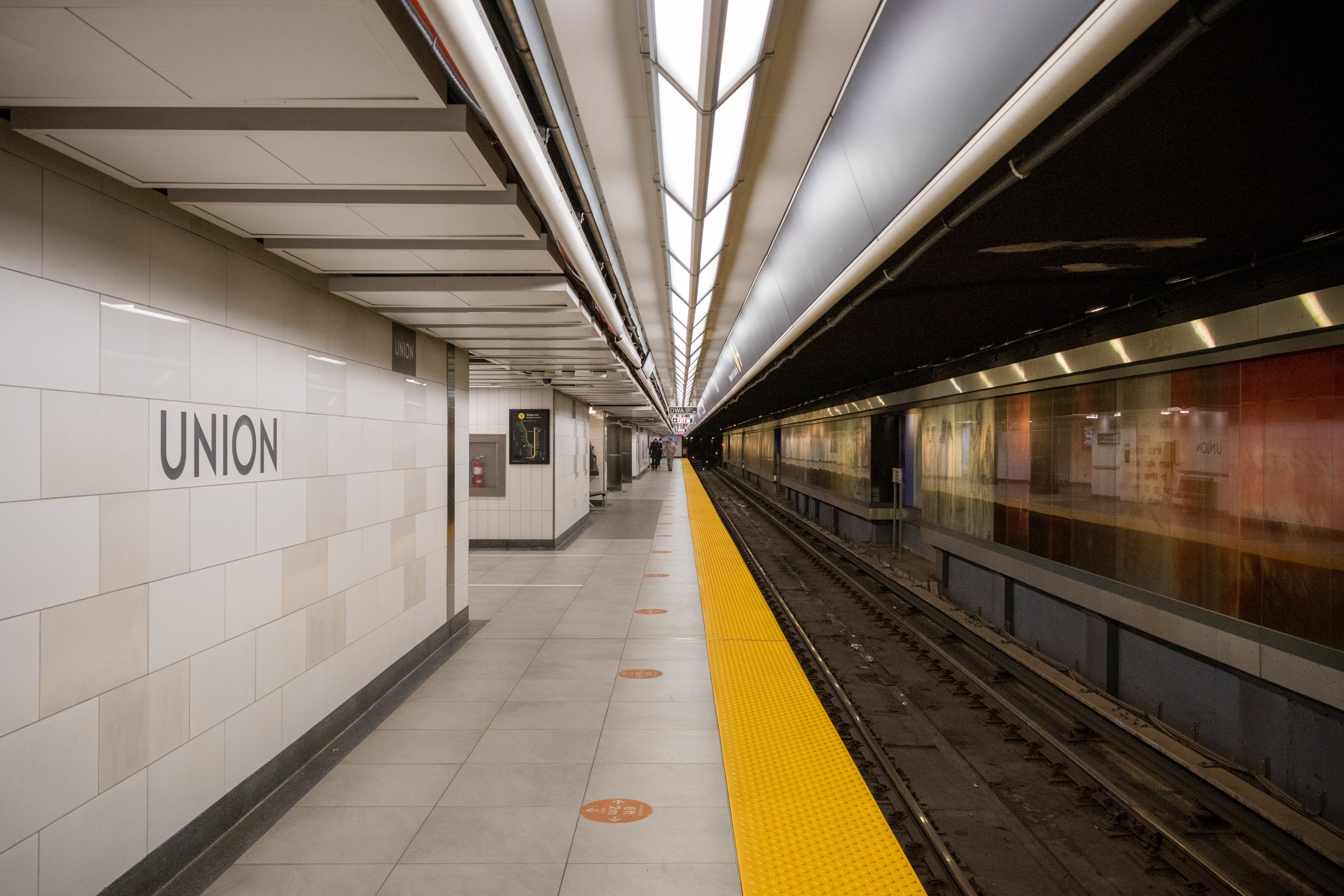
- Union station Yonge-bound platform

General information
- Location: 55 Front Street West, Toronto, Ontario; Canada
- Coordinates: 43°38′44″N 79°22′49″W
- Platforms: Side platforms
- Connections: at Union Station Union Station Bus Terminal TTC buses: 19 Bay; 72B Pape; 97 Yonge; 114 Queens Quay East; 121 Esplanade–River; 202 Cherry Beach; 320 Yonge

Construction
- Structure type: Underground
- Accessible: Yes

Other information
- Website: Official station page

History
- Opened: Line 1: March 30, 1954; 72 years ago; Streetcar: June 22, 1990; 36 years ago
- Rebuilt: 2011–2015

Passengers
- 2023–2024: 136,515
- Rank: 3 of 70

Services
Preceding station	Toronto Transit Commission	Following station
St. Andrew towards Vaughan	Line 1 Yonge–University	King towards Finch
Queens Quay towards Exhibition Loop	509 Harbourfront	Terminus
Queens Quay towards Spadina	510 Spadina	Terminus
Track layout
Subway
Streetcar
Location

Union is a rapid transit station on Line 1 Yonge–University of the Toronto subway in Toronto, Ontario, Canada. It opened in 1954 as one of twelve original stations on the first phase of what was then called the Yonge Subway, the first rapid transit line in Canada. It was the southern terminus of the line until the opening of the University line in 1963, and today, is the inflection point of the U-shaped line. Along with Spadina station and Queens Quay station, it is one of three stations open overnight to support late-night streetcar routes.

Union station is located on Front Street between the Yonge Street and University Avenue sections of the line. It is named for and directly connects to the railway station and regional bus terminal of the same name, serving all GO Transit train lines and bus services along with Via Rail (including Amtrak's Maple Leaf service to New York City), Ontario Northland and other intercity bus service providers. It connects to the Union Pearson Express (UPX), a dedicated rail link to Toronto Pearson International Airport. It is the only subway station with a direct connection to Via services.

Based on Toronto's street grid, Union is the southernmost subway station and the closest to Lake Ontario; however, using standard compass directions, Kipling and Islington stations are further south. It serves approximately 100,000 people a day, ranking it as the fourth-busiest station in the system, after Bloor–Yonge, St. George, and Sheppard–Yonge, and the busiest served by only one line. Adjacent to the subway station is an underground terminal loop for the 509 Harbourfront and 510 Spadina streetcar.

In 2007, Union subway station became the first location on the TTC where Presto cards could be used, as part of a trial. Wi-Fi service has been available at this station since 2014.

== History ==
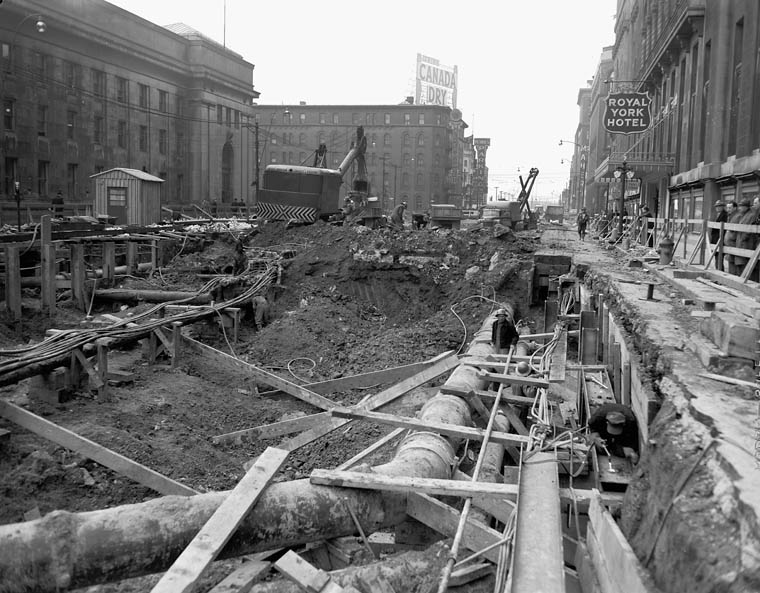
Station excavation circa 1949

The station opened as the southern terminus of the original Yonge subway line on March 30, 1954.

On February 28, 1963, Union became a through station with the opening of the University section of the Yonge–University line.

On June 22, 1990, Union became the terminus of route 604 Harbourfront LRT, now part of the 509 Harbourfront and 510 Spadina streetcar routes. A new underground streetcar platform was built south of the subway tracks, connected to the station concourse by a 30-metre pedestrian tunnel and a flight of stairs.

Elevators were installed in 1996, making Union one of the first wheelchair-accessible subway stations in Toronto. An elevator was added to the streetcar platforms, even though streetcars were not accessible themselves. By the time accessible streetcars began serving the station in 2014, the elevator had been replaced as a part of the station expansion.

On August 18, 2014, a second subway platform was opened to serve Yonge line trains, leaving the existing platform to serve only University line trains.

=== Station expansion ===
In 2003, planning began on a station expansion to address overcrowding in the station. Despite being one of the busiest stations in the system, the station had only one narrow island platform serving both the University and Yonge lines, and a small concourse area.

The plan was to build a new subway platform on the south side of the tracks to serve the Yonge portion of the line, leaving the existing island platform to serve only the University portion. This new platform would feature a step-free connection to the streetcar platform. The project also included an expansion of the concourse level, the replacement of all finishes and signage, installation of public art, as well as improved connections to the adjacent Union Station and the Path network.

At a cost of CA$137 million, construction began in February 2011, with the new second platform opening on August 18, 2014. The project was completed in 2015 with the completion of the station renovation.

In 2019, as part of the rebuilding and expansion of the adjacent Union Station, large glass canopies were installed in the "moat" that connects the subway station to the rest of the Union station complex. This weather-protected route connecting to the main concourses at Union Station ensures that commuters do not need to go outside when entering or leaving the TTC station.

== Station decor ==
When the station opened in 1954, the wall coverings were glossy yellow Vitrolite tiles with red lettering and trim, and the station name on the walls was in the TTC's unique Toronto Subway Font. During renovations in the 1980s, the yellow Vitrolite tiles were replaced with brown ceramic tiles and vinyl siding, and the station font was changed to Univers.

The 2011 to 2015 station expansion replaced these tiles and panels with white tiles and black trim, and the font used to render the station name was returned to its original Toronto Subway typeface.

As part of the second platform project, a glass wall was built to block off the southern side of the old platform, since it now only serves the University line. It features the art piece "Zones of Immersion" by Stuart Reid, a professor at the OCAD University The work comprises 166 large glass panels, each measuring more than one by two metres, extending 170-metre (560 ft) along the length of the platform. Mostly transparent, it is visible from both the Yonge and University platforms. Each panel contains images or words, many based on sketches that Reid drew while riding the subway. Public reaction towards the art piece has been mixed, with some users of the station finding it "tragic" or "dark and depressing".

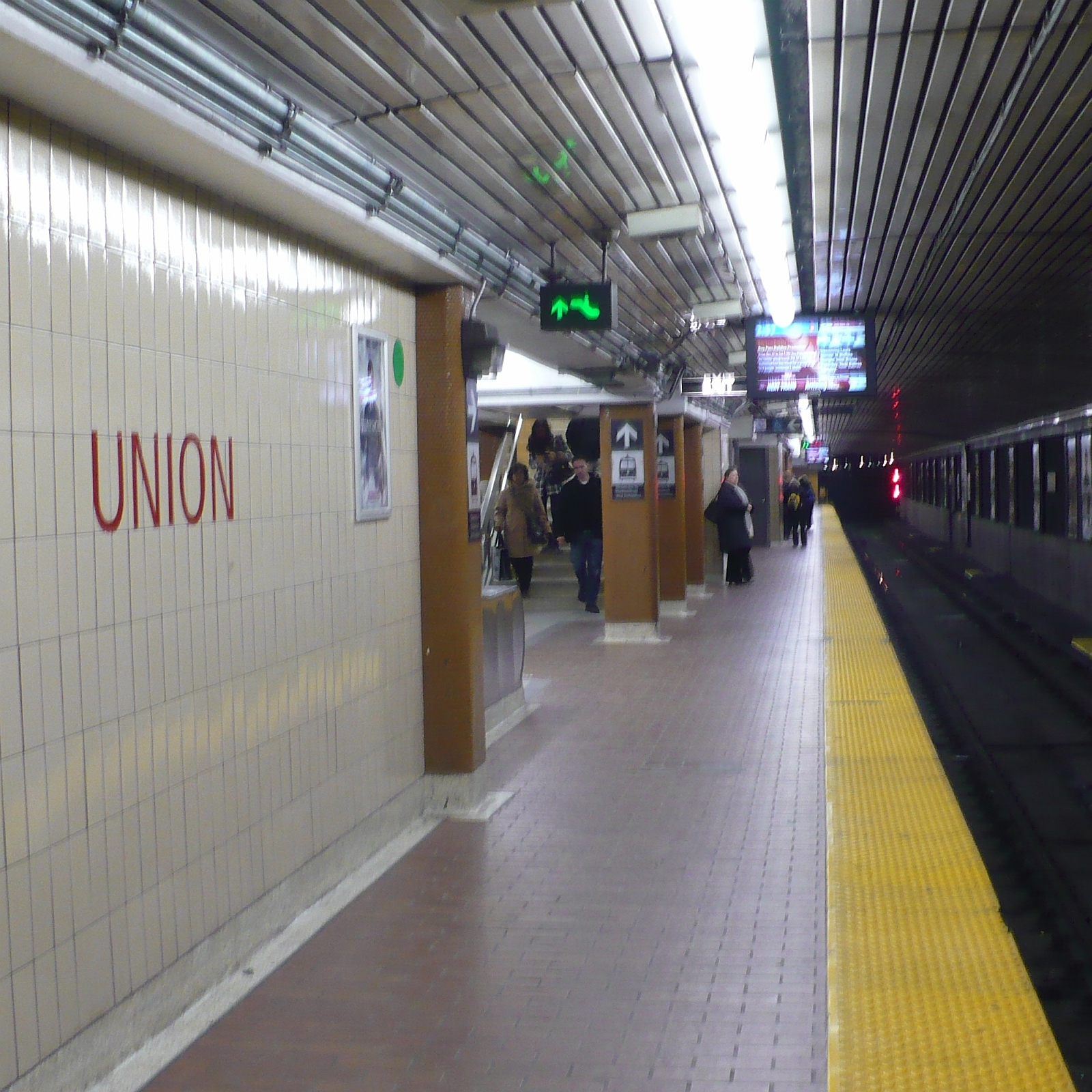
Station platform in 2009 with white and brown ceramic wall tiles from the 1980s

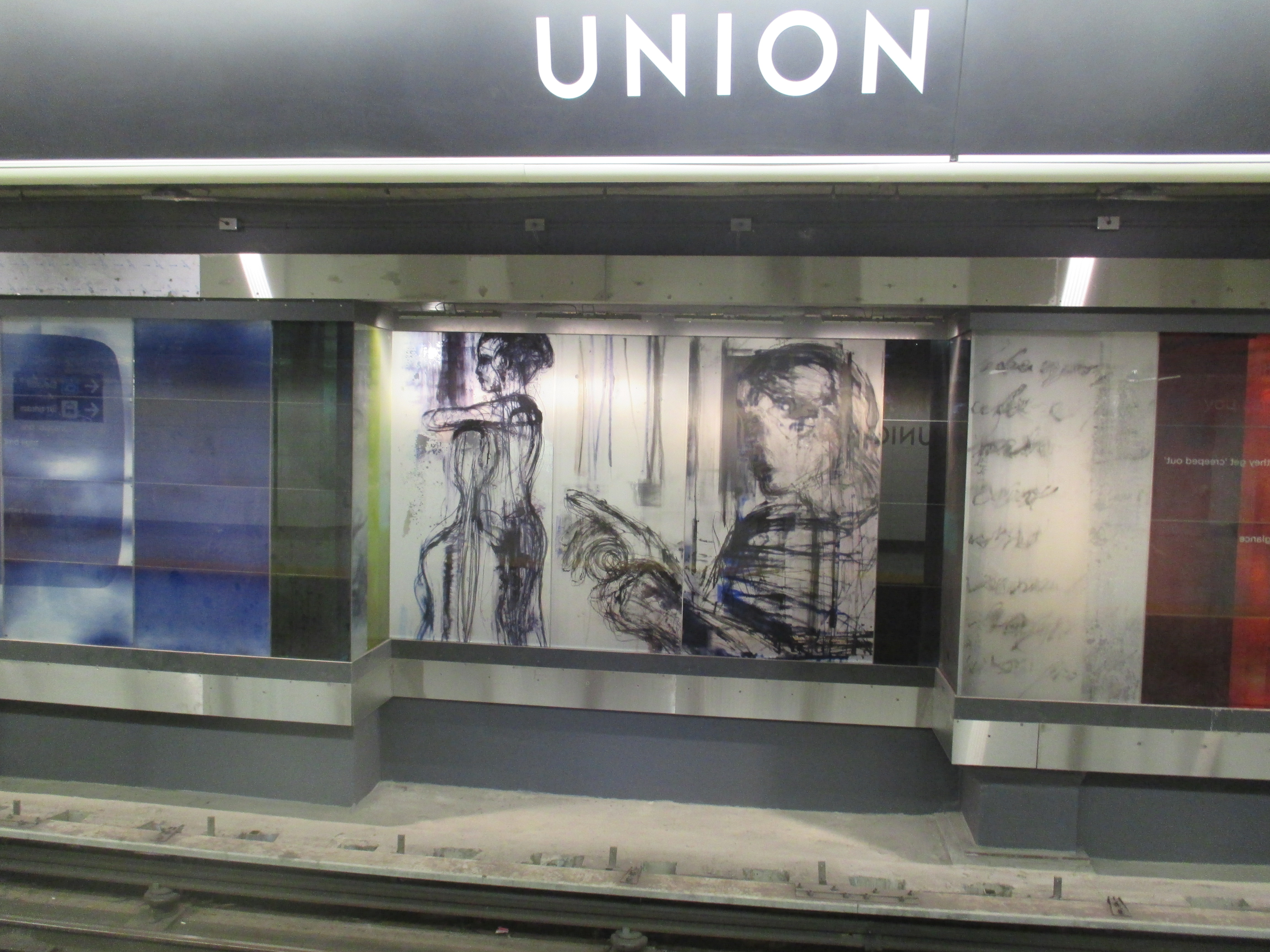
Panel from Zones of Immersion by Stuart Reid opposite the new platform after the 2015 station expansion

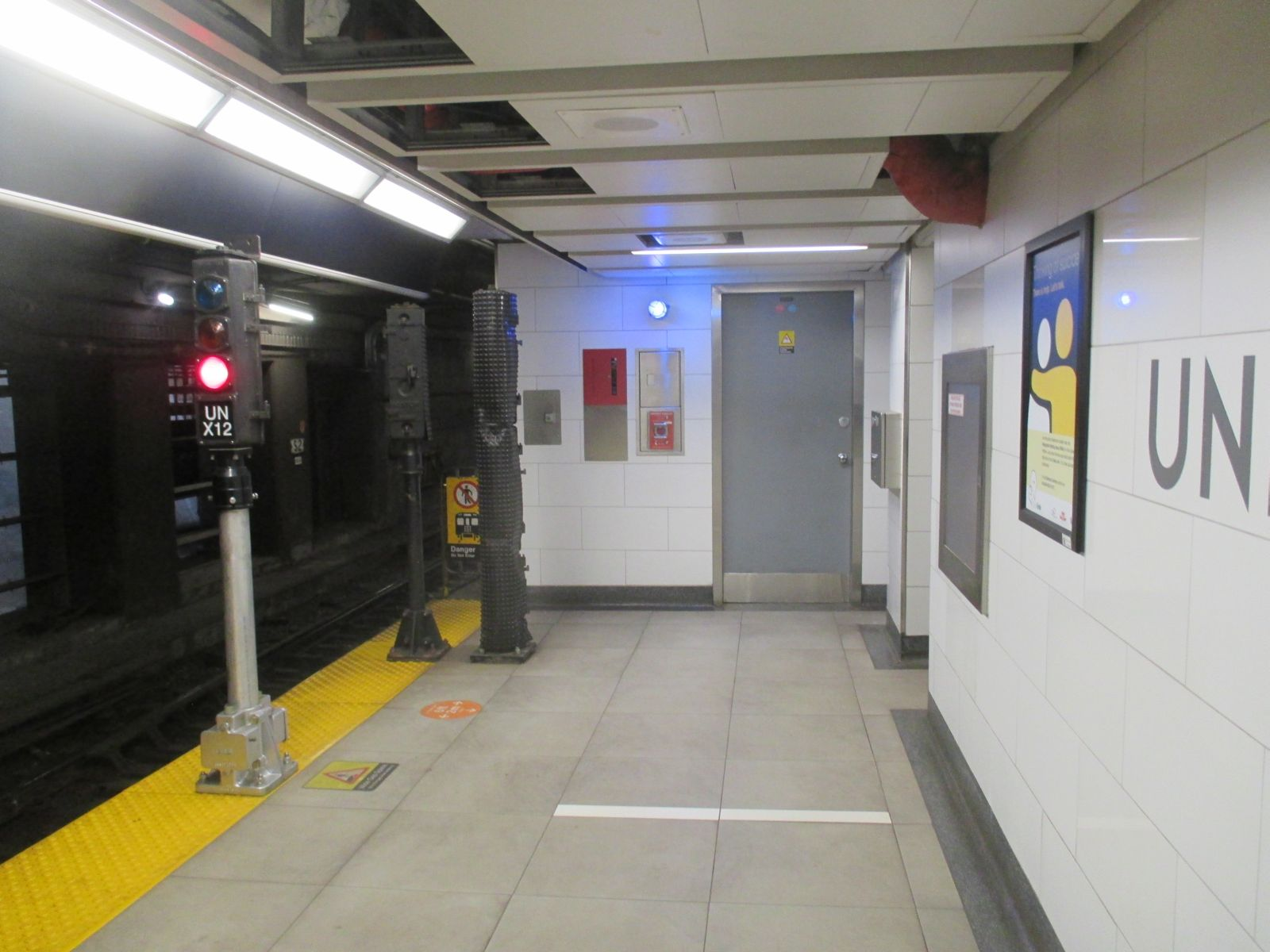
Signal at east end of University line platform

== Subway infrastructure in the vicinity ==
The station lies on an east–west axis along Front Street. It is one of three stations on Line 1 with an east–west orientation, the others being St. George and Downsview Park. Leaving the station eastbound, the Yonge leg of the line runs briefly under Front Street and turns 90 degrees north to run under Yonge Street; leaving westbound, the University leg also runs under Front Street, and shortly after turns 90 degrees north to run under University Avenue.

=== Entrances ===
North side entrances:

- Street-level stairs on north side of Front Street
- Underground connection from Royal Bank Plaza
- Underground connection from Brookfield Place

South side entrances:

- 2 street-level staircases on south side of Front Street
- Connections via the "moat" to the Union railway station

== Streetcar loop ==
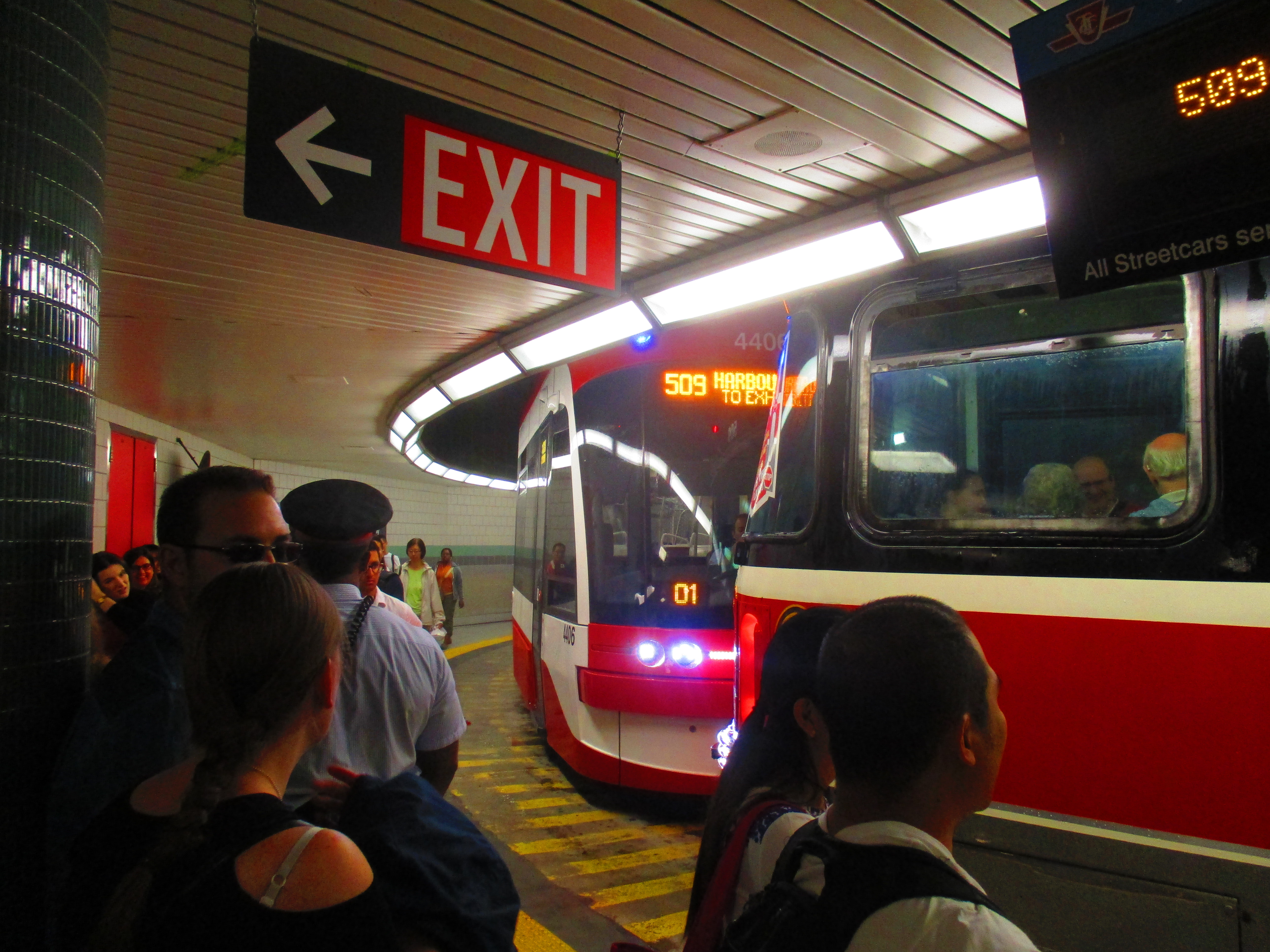
A Flexity streetcar behind a CLRV in the Union station loop

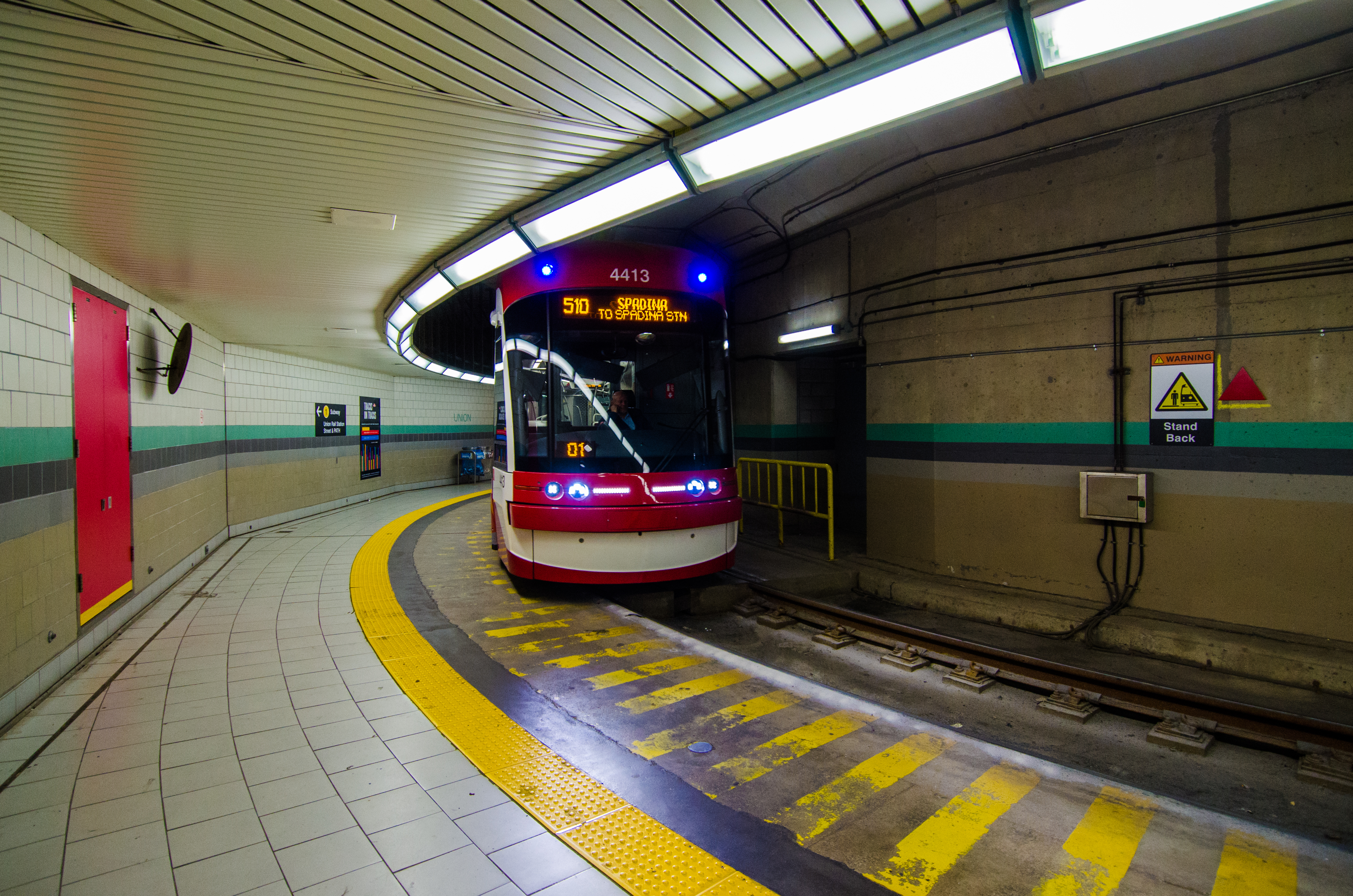
510 Spadina streetcar at Union streetcar platform

Union Station Loop is located underground at the north end of a 500 m (1,600 ft) tunnel running under Bay Street through the underground Queens Quay station from the street Queens Quay. The loop runs anticlockwise on a single track along a curved platform. An underground passage connects the streetcar platform to the Yonge subway platform. Union Station Loop is the eastern terminus of the 509 Harbourfront and southern terminus of the 510 Spadina streetcar route. The loop has a minimum radius of curvature of 14.5 m (48 ft).

A 2017 TTC report stated that the streetcar loop would become inadequate for the volume of customers it handled because of its single track and its curved, narrow platform. The loop would not be able to handle the peak demand of 3700 people per hour projected for 2041. A 2010 environmental assessment for the East Bayfront LRT (a proposed streetcar line) approved rebuilding the existing streetcar loop plus the construction of a connection from the streetcar tunnel to the East Bayfront LRT on Queens Quay East. The LRT design would have rebuilt the loop to have four platforms, each with a bypass track, so that a streetcar could bypass other streetcars loading or unloading. Expansion of the loop's capacity would be needed in order to support an East Bayfront LRT. In 2017, conversion of the tunnel under Bay Street to operate a funicular shuttle to Queens Quay station instead of streetcars was considered but ultimately rejected. As of 2021, the conversion of the streetcar loop into a four-platform configuration is in the design stage.

== Nearby landmarks ==
Nearby landmarks include the Union Station railway station, the Royal York Hotel, Scotiabank Arena, CIBC Square, the Rogers Centre stadium, the Metro Toronto Convention Centre, the CN Tower, Royal Bank Plaza, Brookfield Place, the Hockey Hall of Fame, and the Meridian Hall.

== Surface connections ==
A direct connection between the subway and streetcars within the fare-paid zone is provided for these routes:

Route	Name	Additional information
509	Harbourfront	Westbound to Exhibition Loop
510	Spadina	Northbound to Spadina station via Harbourfront
310	Spadina Blue Night	Northbound to Spadina station via Harbourfront

Access to these routes is also available while the subway is not running, as the station is open overnight.

A transfer is required to connect between the subway or streetcars and these bus routes at curbside stops:

Route	Name	Additional information
19	Bay	Northbound to Dupont Street and southbound to Queens Quay and Sherbourne Street
72B	Pape	Northbound to Pape station via Queens Quay and Commissioners Street
97C	Yonge	Northbound to Eglinton station (Rush hour service)
114	Queens Quay East	Eastbound to Carlaw Avenue via Ookwemin Minising
121	Esplanade–River	Eastbound to Bridgepoint Active Healthcare
202	Cherry Beach	Eastbound to Cherry Beach (Seasonal service)
320	Yonge Blue Night	Northbound to Steeles Avenue East and southbound to Queens Quay
