= Queens Quay station =

Streetcar station in Toronto, Canada

Queens Quay
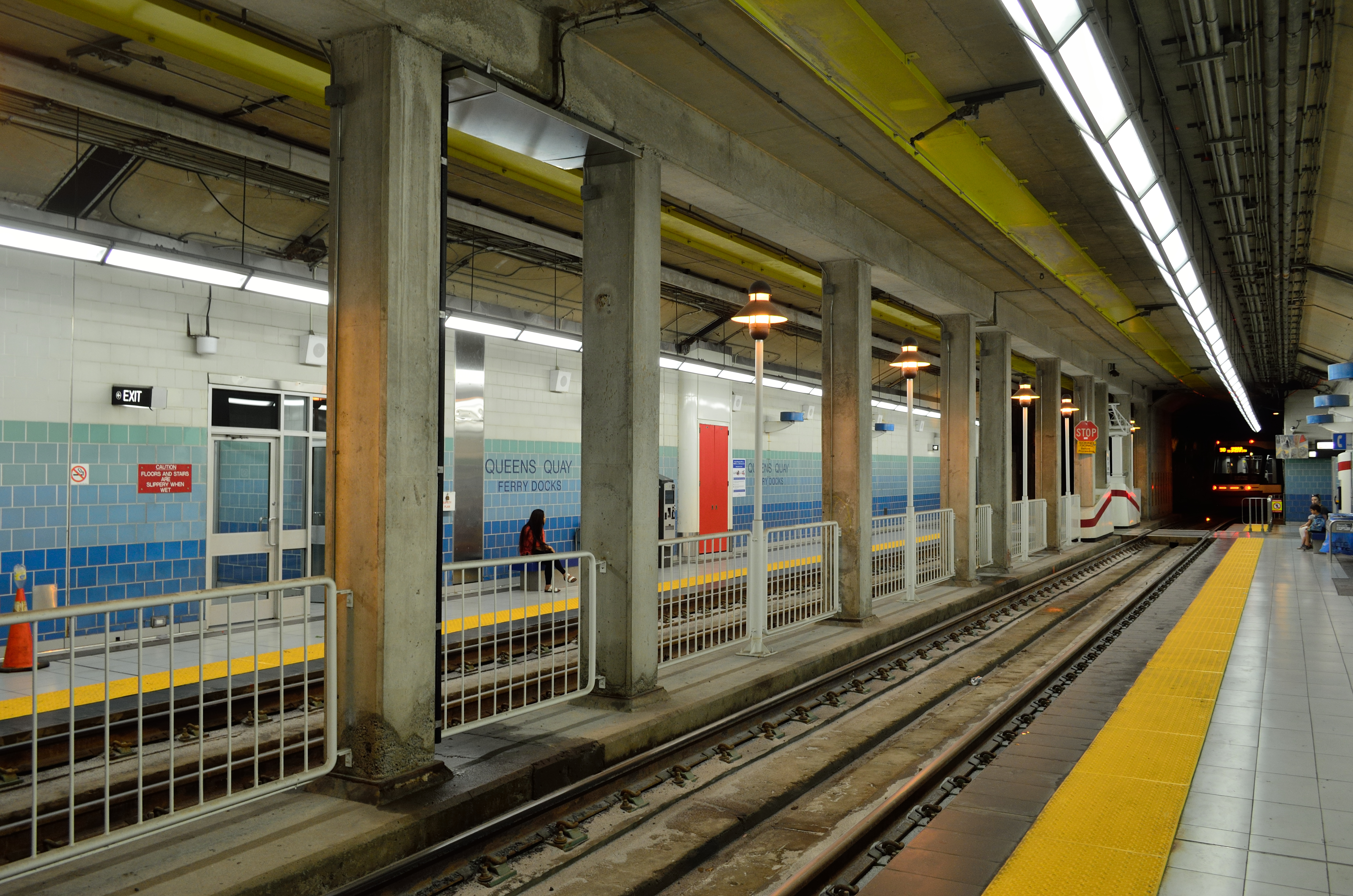
- Station platforms looking south, with the pedestrian crossing visible at the far end

General information
- Location: 10 Bay Street, Toronto, Ontario; Canada
- Coordinates: 43.64151°N 79.37704°W
- Platforms: Side
- Connections: Jack Layton Ferry Terminal; TTC buses

Construction
- Structure type: Underground

History
- Opened: 1990; 36 years ago

Services
Preceding station	Toronto Transit Commission	Following station
Harbourfront Centre towards Exhibition Loop	509 Harbourfront	Union Terminus
Harbourfront Centre towards Spadina	510 Spadina	Union Terminus
Location

Queens Quay is an underground streetcar station of the Toronto streetcar system in Toronto, Ontario, Canada. Along with Spadina station and Union station, it is one of three stations open overnight to support late-night streetcar routes. It is the only underground streetcar station that is not part of or connected to a Toronto subway station (Union, Spadina, and St. Clair West subway stations have underground stations for streetcars as well). It was opened in 1990 as part of the former Harbourfront LRT route. The station is now served by the 509 Harbourfront, 510 Spadina daytime routes and the 310 Spadina night route.

The station is named after Queens Quay, an adjacent street skirting Toronto's waterfront. The station's internal signage bears the subtitle "Ferry Docks", a reference to the nearby Jack Layton Ferry Terminal for the Toronto Island ferries that provide pedestrian access to the Toronto Islands.

This station did not open at the same time as the rest of the Harbourfront line it served, due to disputes regarding direct access to nearby businesses that eventually fell through. Additionally, after the station did open, the "FERRY DOCKS" subtitle was not yet present.

== Design ==
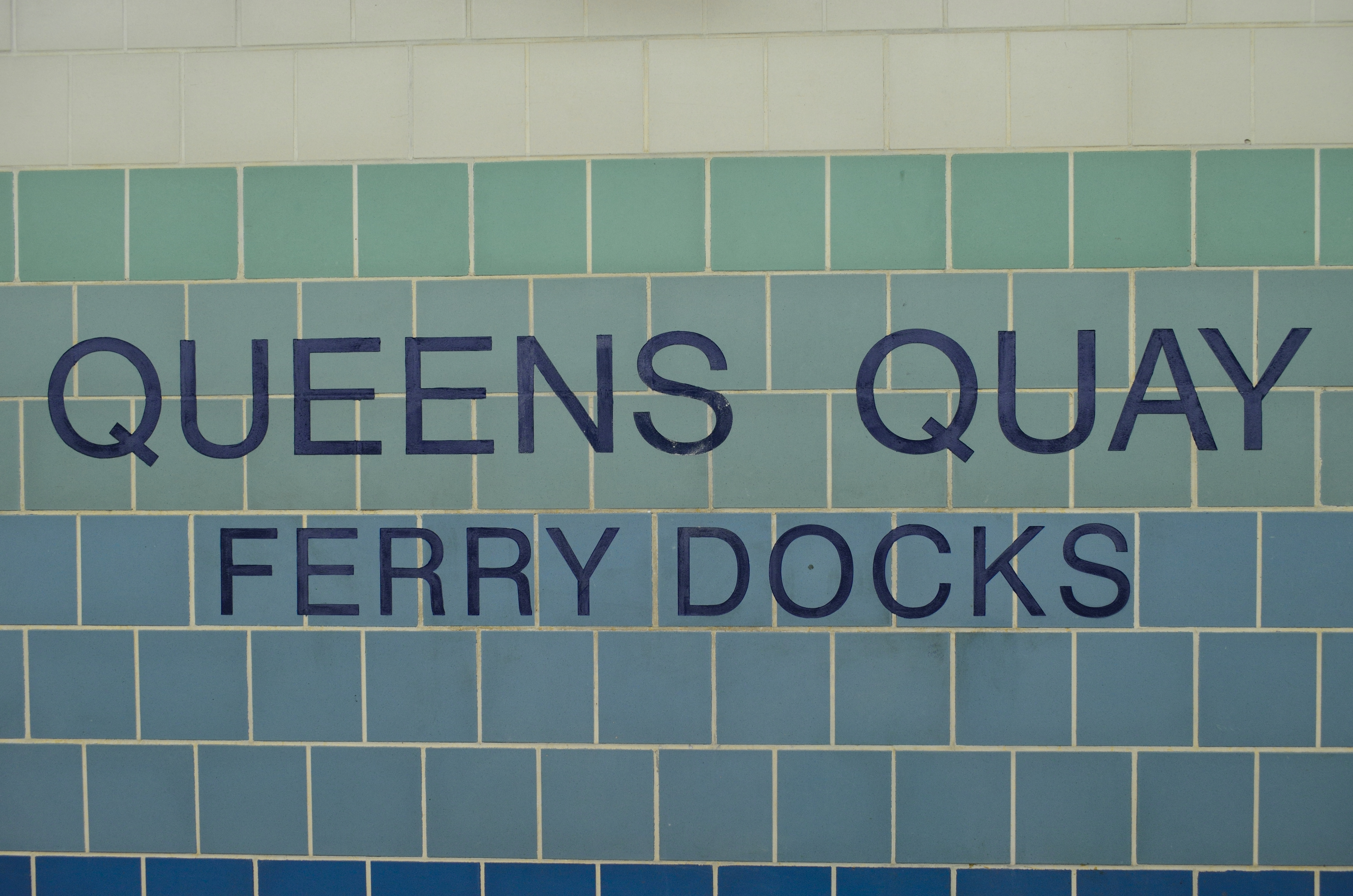
Tiles showing station name and Ferry Docks destination

Queens Quay is a unique station in Toronto because it is served by streetcars rather than subways. It is the only station to have a pedestrian crossing between platforms at track level, as there is no electrified third rail to contend with. Streetcars crossing the pedestrian walkway must stop and sound their gong before proceeding; Union-bound streetcars stop immediately after rounding a sharp curve, ring their gong, and proceed into the stopping zone to load and unload passengers. Exhibition- and Spadina-bound streetcars enter the station, load and unload passengers, ring their gong, then proceed out of the station.

Originally there was to have been an underground station in front of the Westin Harbour Castle Hotel and the Jack Layton Ferry Terminal. Patrons of the hotel were to have had underground access to the station. Plans for the station were cancelled when the hotel changed its mind about sharing in the station's cost. This meant that the fallback location on Bay would require ferry passengers to cross a busy street on foot.

Queens Quay is also the only station in Toronto that does not have permanent staff or faregates, as the streetcar platform is not a fare-paid zone. Passengers pay their fare upon boarding streetcars.

The station was closed from July 2012 to October 2014 due to Waterfront Toronto's project to rebuild Queens Quay West and reconstruction of the Harbourfront streetcar line, during which time there was a replacement bus service. As of the station's reopening on October 12, 2014 a proof-of-payment ticket vending machine is present on the northbound platform.

== Streetcar infrastructure in the vicinity ==
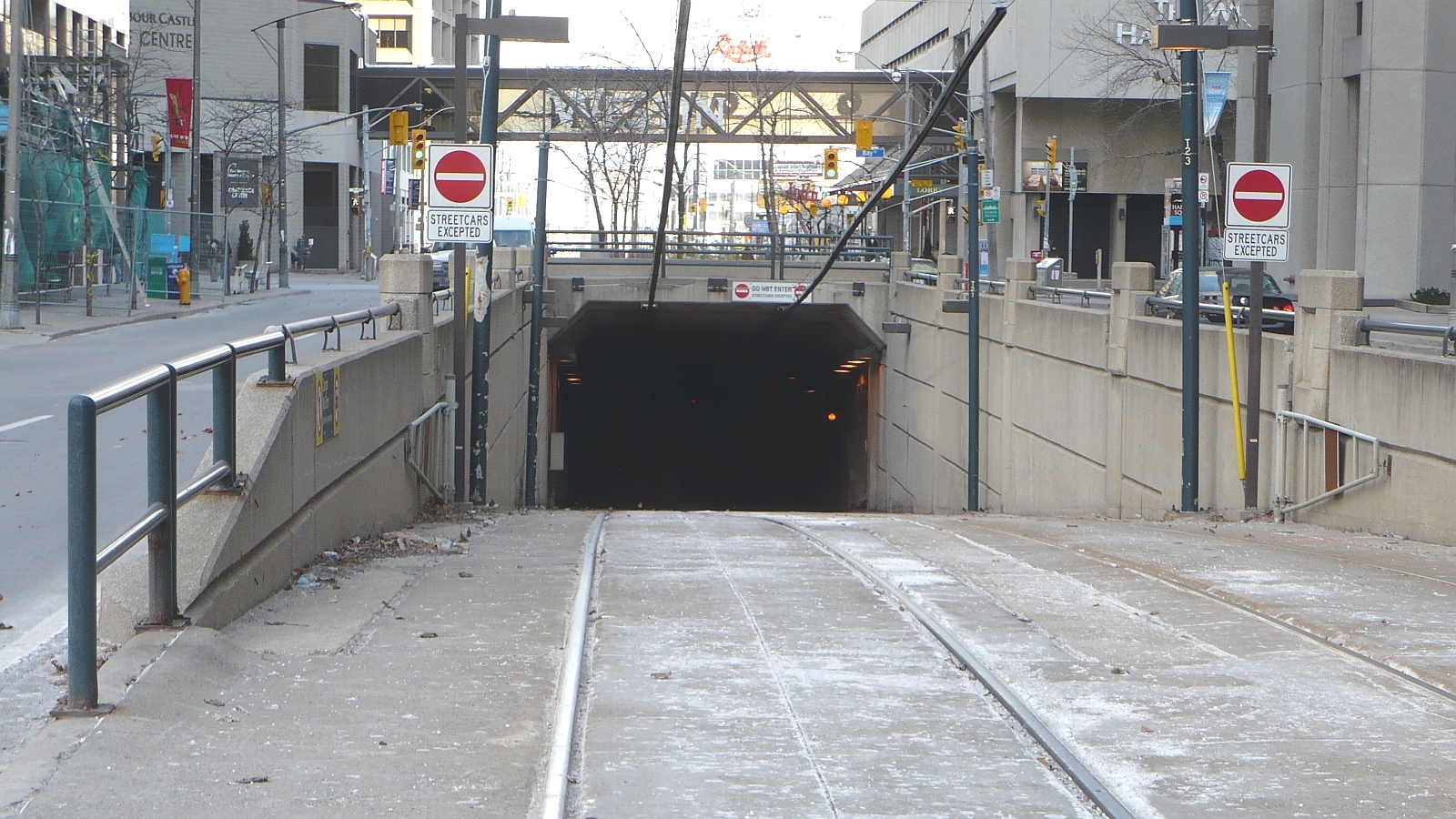
Ramp between Queens Quay West and the station level in 2009

North of this station, the lines enter an underground loop at Union subway station, below Union Station, the city's main railway station; to the south, they emerge from the tunnel onto Queens Quay, where they run west in a dedicated right-of-way as far as Spadina Avenue, where the two routes diverge; the 509 continues west to Exhibition Place, while the 510 turns north towards Spadina station.

=== Tunnel intrusions ===
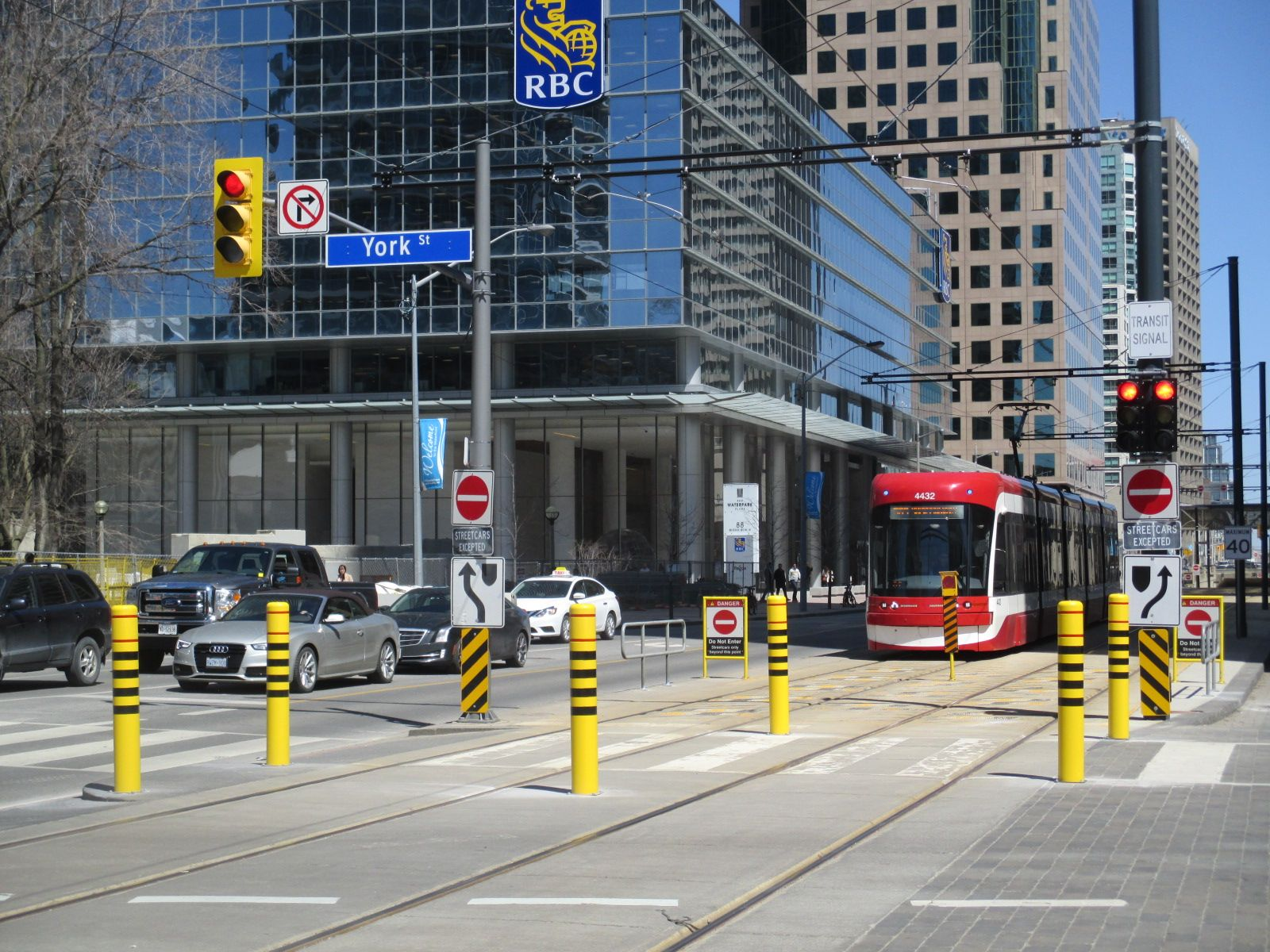
Queens Quay & York Street: Bollards and signage to discourage automobiles from entering the streetcar tunnel

Between 2014 and 2018, 26 motorists inadvertently drove through the Queens Quay tunnel portal via the streetcar ramp on Queens Quay West between York and Bay streets and became trapped in the tunnel. It took the TTC anywhere from 15 minutes to 5 hours to extract trapped vehicles. In 2016, one automobile reached Union station despite the tunnel having no provision for rubber-tire vehicles, with streetcar tracks protruding from a shallow trench. In April 2017, to prevent motorist invasions, the TTC made changes at the tunnel entrance by lowering warning lights closer to driver eye level, by placing a flashing light on a pole between the tracks, by adding rumble strips and by adding signs on posts that also narrow the passage to the tunnel. However, despite these efforts, another motorist drove down the ramp on October 18, 2017, and became trapped in the trench at the bottom. The 24th incident of automobile intrusion occurred on March 17, 2018, spurring the TTC to take further precautions. On April 22, 2018, the TTC added 6 new bollards at the east side of the intersection of Queens Quay West and York Street to obstruct drivers from driving onto the right-of-way and into the tunnel. Further, in late July 2018, the TTC installed two gates at the top of the ramp to the tunnel which can be opened in 3 seconds by a transponder on an approaching streetcar.

On January 22, 2020, a 27th motorist bypassed all the barriers at the tunnel entrance and travelled all the way to Union station before becoming stuck. The intruding SUV passed through the bollards and went past the lights and gates installed in 2018. On December 11, 2023, another motorist tailed a streetcar before the gates were lowered, also getting stuck in the tunnel. On February 3, 2026, a motorist fled the scene on foot after getting their vehicle stuck on the streetcar platform, resulting in a four-hour service delay.

== Future expansion ==
An expansion of Queens Quay station is planned as part of the Waterfront East LRT project, which plans to bring streetcar service in a dedicated right-of-way along Queens Quay East to serve the developing districts of the Portlands, West Don Lands, and East Bayfront. A new entrance and exit on the south side of Queens Quay is planned, along with improvements to the existing entrance. Additionally, a tunnel under the streetcar tracks for passengers to move between the two platforms, replacing the current level crossing, is also planned.

== Nearby landmarks and attractions ==
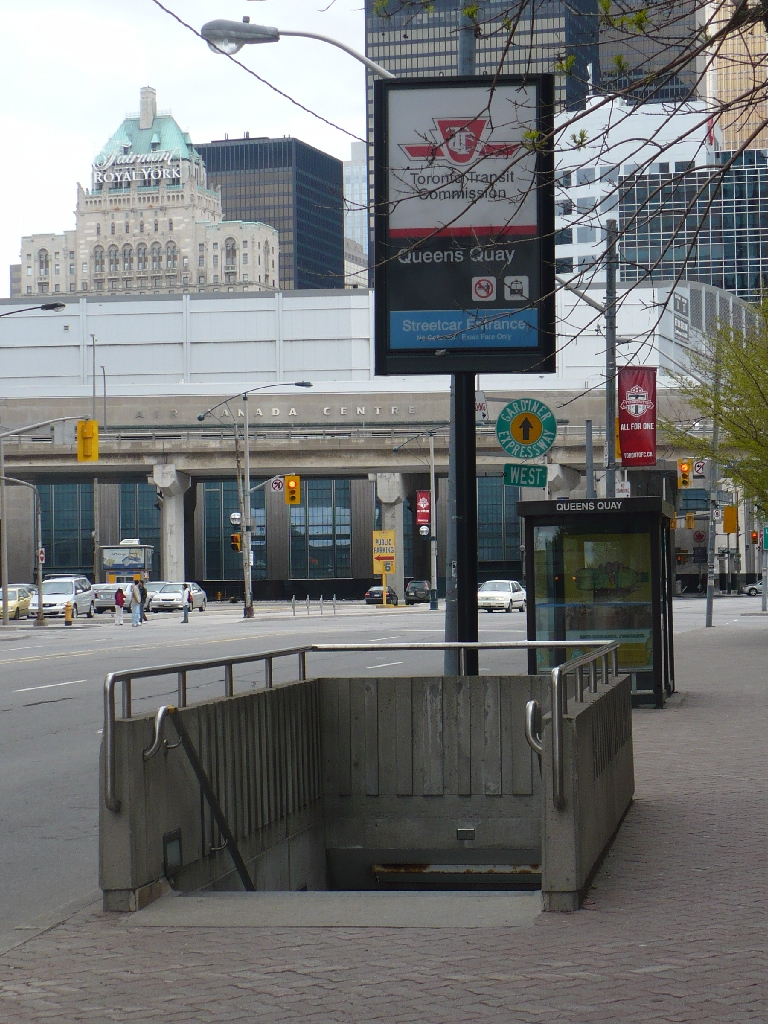
Passenger entrance on the east side of Bay St. The Fairmont Royal York hotel, Scotiabank Arena and TD Centre are in the background

- Scotiabank Arena
- Queen's Quay Terminal
- Jack Layton Ferry Terminal
- One Yonge Street
- RBC WaterPark Place
- Westin Harbour Castle

== Former landmarks ==
- Captain John's Harbour Boat Restaurant (scrapped in 2015)

== See also ==
- Waterfront East LRT
