= Toronto Music Garden =

Park in Toronto, Ontario, Canada

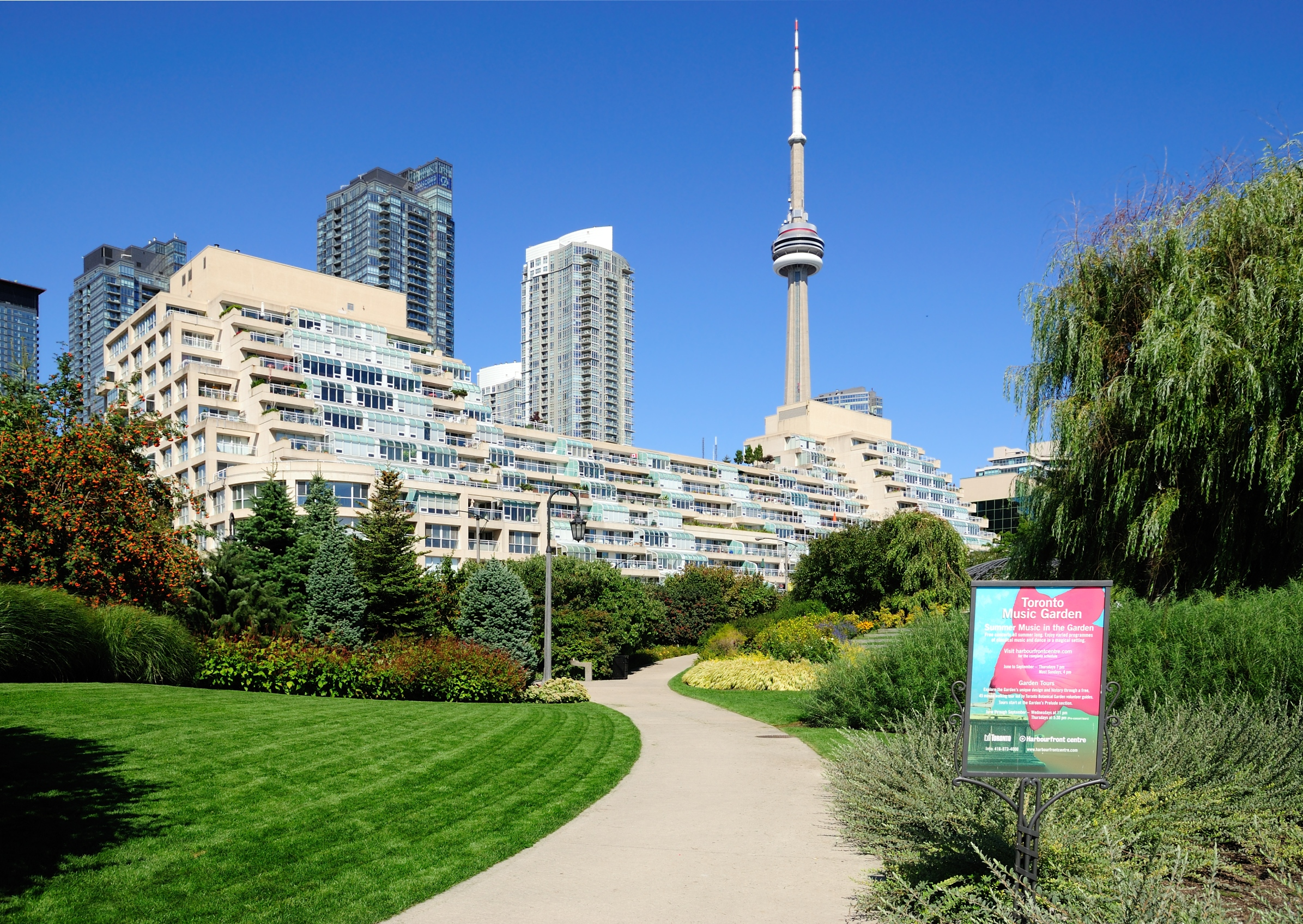
- Part of the park in 2008
- Interactive map of Toronto Music Garden
- Location: Toronto, Ontario, Canada
- Coordinates: 43°38′13″N 79°23′39″W

Toronto Music Garden is a park in Toronto, Ontario, Canada.
