= City School (Toronto) =

High school in downtown Toronto

Coordinates: 43°38′09.2″N 79°23′49.7″W

City School is an alternative high school in Toronto, Ontario, Canada. Founded in the late 1970s, it offers classes from grades 9 to 12 with smaller class sizes and a focus on subjects like Humanities, Mathematics, Arts, and Sciences. The student population for the 2017-2018 school year was 146.

The school is on the third floor at 635 Queens Quay West in shared space with a preschool, elementary school and community centre, which they relocated in 1997.

== See also ==
- Education in Ontario
- List of secondary schools in Ontario
