= Queen's Quay Terminal =

Coordinates: 43.63901°N 79.380641°W

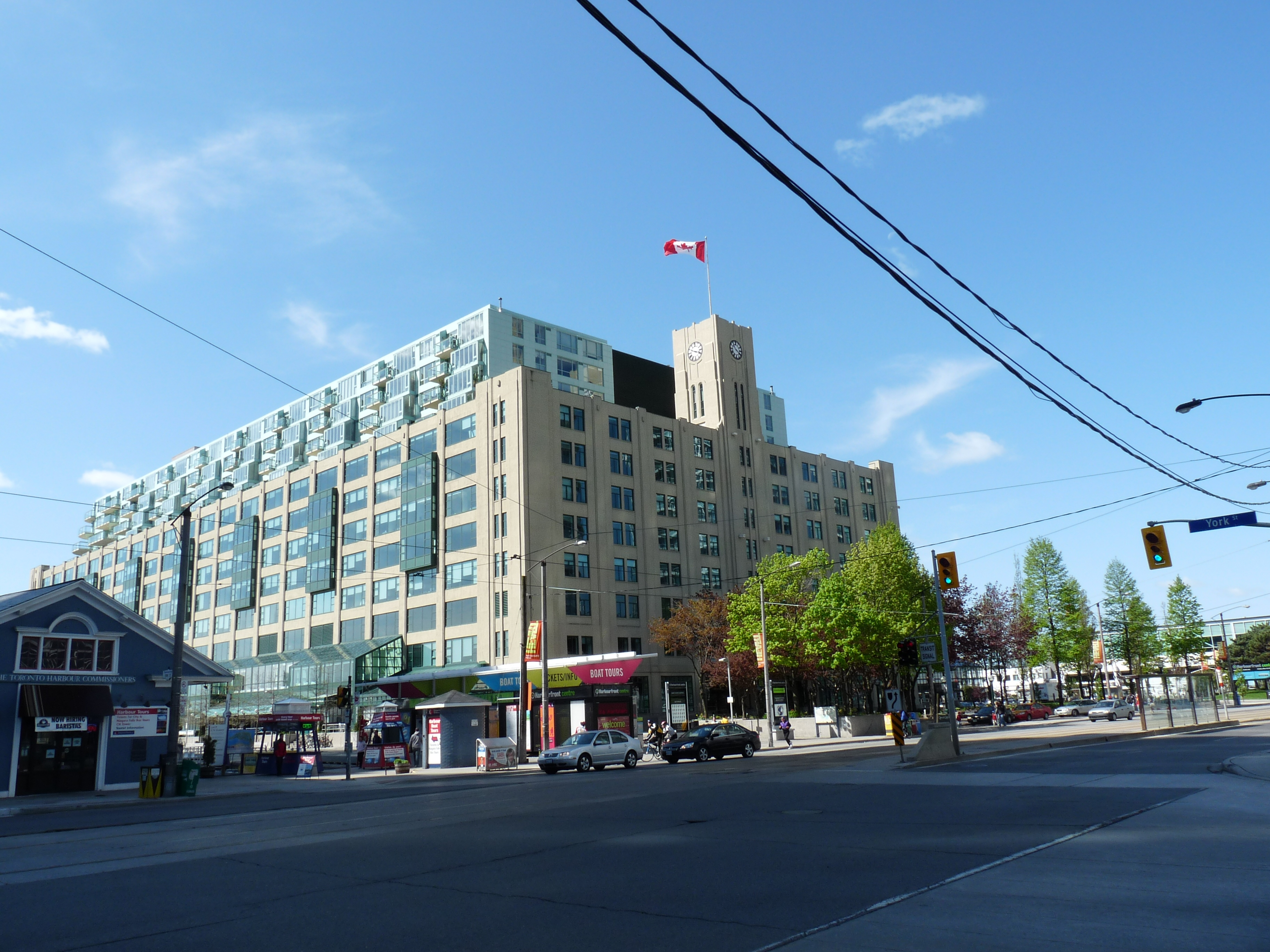
- The Marine Quay Terminal of heritage preservation status with its north face facade having been preserved when remodelled in 1982 as seen in 2009
- Former names: Canadian Rail and Harbour Terminals Warehouse; Toronto Terminal Warehouse

General information
- Type: Mixed-use residential and commercial
- Location: 207 Queen's Quay West, Toronto, Ontario, Canada
- Groundbreaking: April 6, 1926
- Completed: 1927
- Renovated: June 23, 1983
- Cost: CA$7 million
- Renovation cost: CA$60 million
- Owner: Northam Canadian Commercial Property Fund (50%); Industrial Alliance Financial Group (50%)

Height
- Height: 43 metres (141 ft)

Dimensions
- Diameter: 500 ft × 210 ft (152 m × 64 m)

Design and construction
- Architecture firm: Moores & Dunford
- Main contractor: Park-Lap Inc.

Renovating team
- Architect: Zeidler Roberts Partnership
- Awards: 1986- Governor General's Medal for Architecture; 1989- OAA Architectural Excellence Award

Queen's Quay Terminal is a condominium apartment, office and retail complex in the Harbourfront neighbourhood in Toronto, Ontario, Canada. It was originally built in 1927 as a marine terminal with office, warehouse and cold-storage facilities. When shipping to Toronto declined in the 1960s and 1970s, the building was bought by the Government of Canada to be repurposed along with a section of the industrial waterfront. The Terminal Building itself was rebuilt in the 1980s with the addition of four floors of residential above the original facility, which was converted into retail and office uses. The cold storage wing was demolished (became open public space called Canada Square) and its plant building became The Power Plant gallery and Harbourfront Centre Theatre.

== History ==
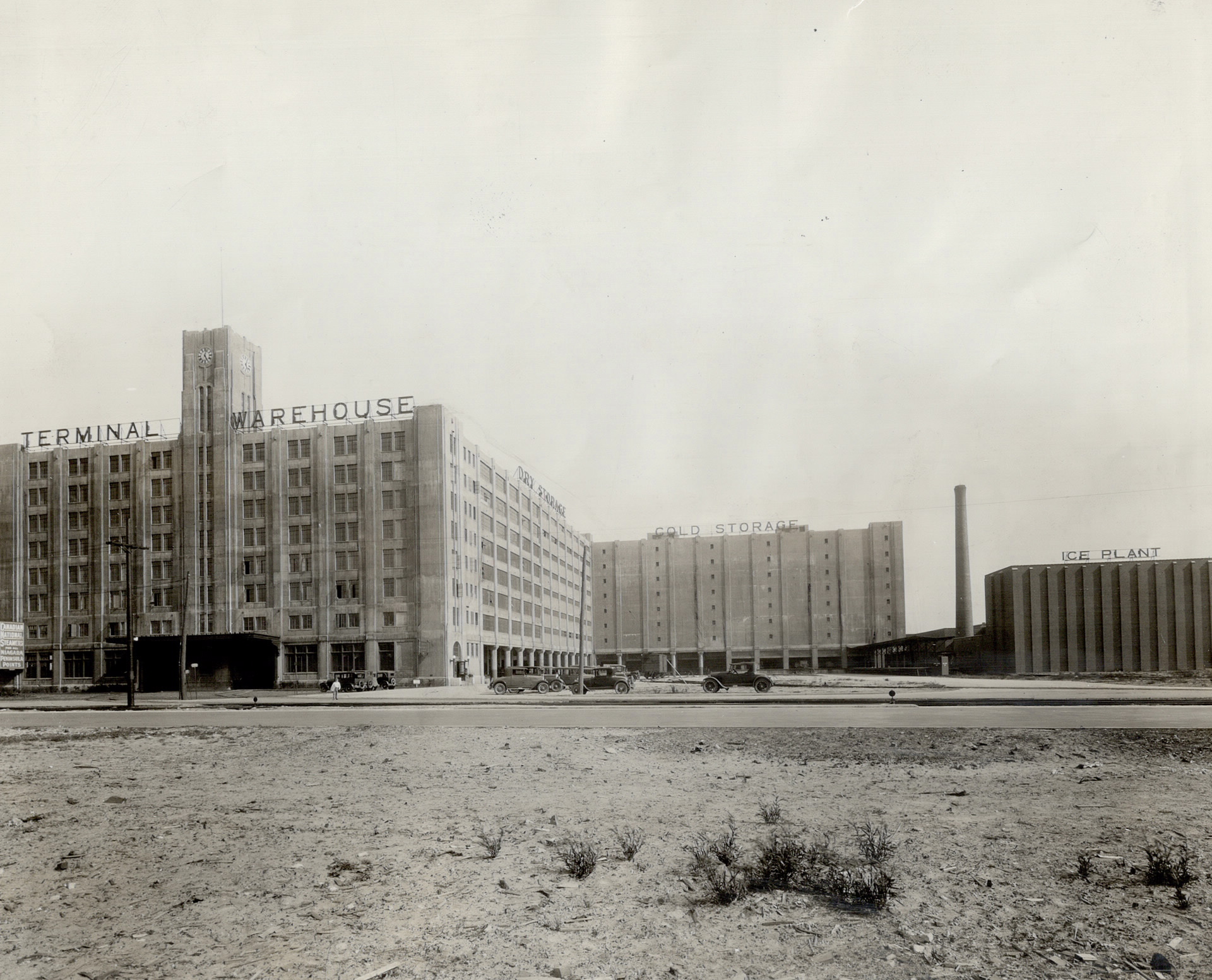
Image of Terminal Warehouse from the north in 1929

The building was originally a cold storage warehouse facility, known as the Toronto Terminal Warehouse. It was built by Moores & Dunford of New York City. The first sod was turned in April 1926 and it opened in February 1927. The building was accessible to both CN and CP rail lines and Great Lakes steamships. It was the first poured concrete building in Canada and one of the largest buildings in the country. It had over 1,000,000 square feet (93,000 m^{2}) of floor space. The main storage building was 420 by 200 feet (128 m × 61 m) and the cold-storage wing was 140 by 220 feet (43 m × 67 m), both eight stories in height. The floors were designed overly strong to hold 800 pounds (360 kg) per square foot. The ice, heating, and power plants were in a separate building to the west. The building had a state-of-the-art ice plant, ventilation and sprinkler system, and rail sidings right into the building to eliminate trucking. The building was adorned with a neon "Terminal Warehouse" sign and each wing ("Dry Storage", "Cold Storage" and "Ice Plant") also had a rooftop neon sign.

The CA$7 million ($126 million in 2025 dollars) structure was built on a 14.5 acres (5.9 ha) site. The site was a former water lot land-filled by the Toronto Harbour Commission and was sold at $55,000 per acre. It was supported by 10,000 wooden piles driven 10 metres (33 ft) through landfill to the bedrock of Toronto Harbour. 500 workers were employed in its construction. One worker, Duncan Murray, died during construction from a fall at the site.

The building was used for offices, cold storage, bonded storage and light manufacturing. Among its tenants was the Minister of Customs & Excise, the Canadian Doughnut Company Ltd., Elizabeth Arden and Black and Decker. Its use as a marine terminal declined in the 1960s as container facilities opened in the east part of the harbour. Also, although the St. Lawrence Seaway had opened in 1959, shipping to Toronto declined as container shipping ports in Montreal and Halifax took over as ports of entry for international shipments to Canada. According to the renovation architect Eberhard Zeidler, the building had fallen into disrepair, its roof and concrete in poor condition. Its clock tower had not worked in several years due to a rusted clock face.

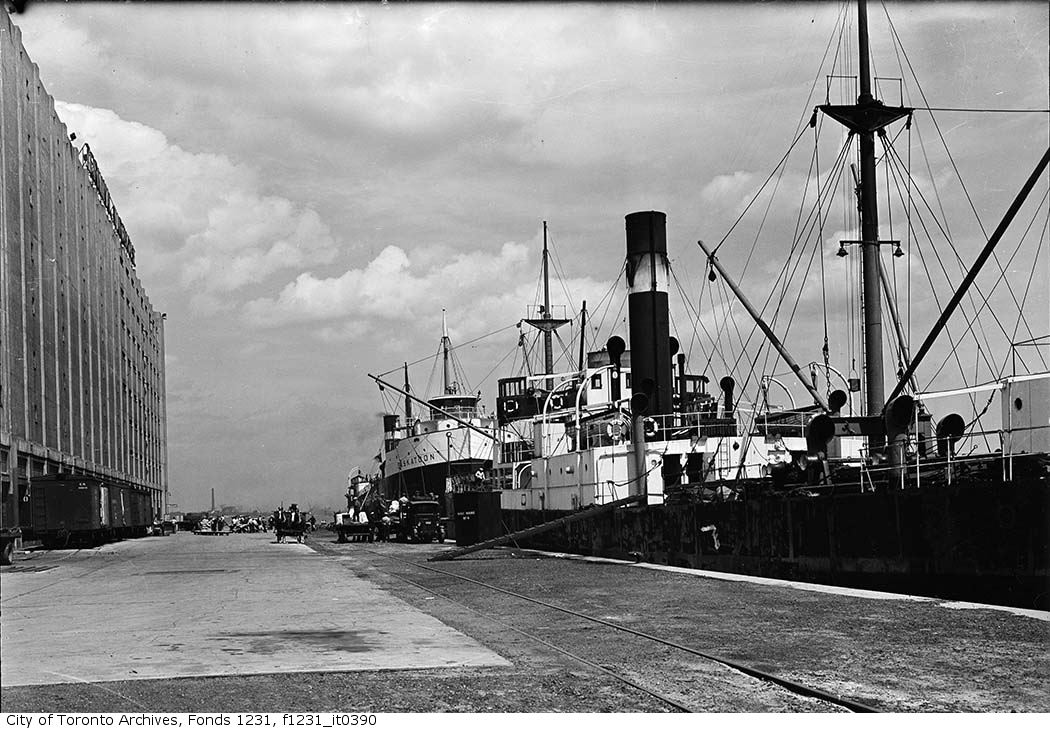
View of freighters at dock and terminal building, 1936

In 1972, the Government of Canada created the Harbourfront Corporation to repurpose 86 acres (35 ha) of industrial harbourfront lands west of York Street for cultural, recreation, parkland and residential uses. In 1973, it purchased the Terminal Warehouse property for CA$9.725 million from the Pittson Co. of New York City. Metro Toronto's Parks Commissioner Tommy Thompson called for the demolition of the building, calling it a "monstrosity on the waterfront".

The southwest cold storage wing was demolished. The area is now Canada Square between Queen's Quay Terminal and the Harbourfront Centre Theatre. The terminal's plant building was converted to house The Power Plant gallery and Harbourfront Centre Theatre. The neighbouring Direct Winters Building, built by early owners of Terminal Warehouse, became the main complex for Harbourfront's recreational activities. It is now known as Harbourfront Centre. A rail siding along the south facade of the building was converted to a public promenade that is also the location of the docks for sight-seeing boat cruises of Toronto Harbour.

The remaining building was converted to a residential, office and retail complex in 1983. The CA$60 million building rebuild was developed by Olympia and York who negotiated a 99-year lease with the government. The renovations by Zeidler Roberts added four floors to the original eight-floor structure, for a total of 750,000 square feet (70,000 m^{2}) of space with 72 condominium apartments.

The renovation recoated the exterior with new concrete and new glass and added new Art Deco-styled entrances for the office and residential tenants. A feature of the renovation of the interior were several new atriums including the Arcade at the south-east corner, which reaches the full height of the building. The residential section has a garden with a bridge and a swimming pool on the roof. The roof itself has a green patina metal cladding that is similar to the roofs of the nearby Toronto Union Station and Royal York Hotel.

The renovation added the CA$3.9 million, 450-seat, Premiere Dance Theatre, which is rented by Harbourfront for CA$1 per year. The stage has a sprung wood floor to be less harsh on dancers. In 2008, the Premiere Dance Theatre was renovated and reopened as the Fleck Dance Theatre. although the concept design was by Zeidler

The renovation was awarded a Governor General's Medal for Architecture in 1986 and awarded the Ontario Association of Architects' Architectural Excellence Award in 1989. The New York Times mentioned it as an example of successful revitalization efforts in Toronto during the 1980s.

The property was purchased by Brookfield Properties in October 1997 for CA$40 million. Brookfield renovated the retail floors in 2017. The building is now owned by Northam Canadian Commercial Property Fund and Industrial Alliance Financial Group and managed by Northam Realty Advisors Limited.

== Facilities and tenants ==
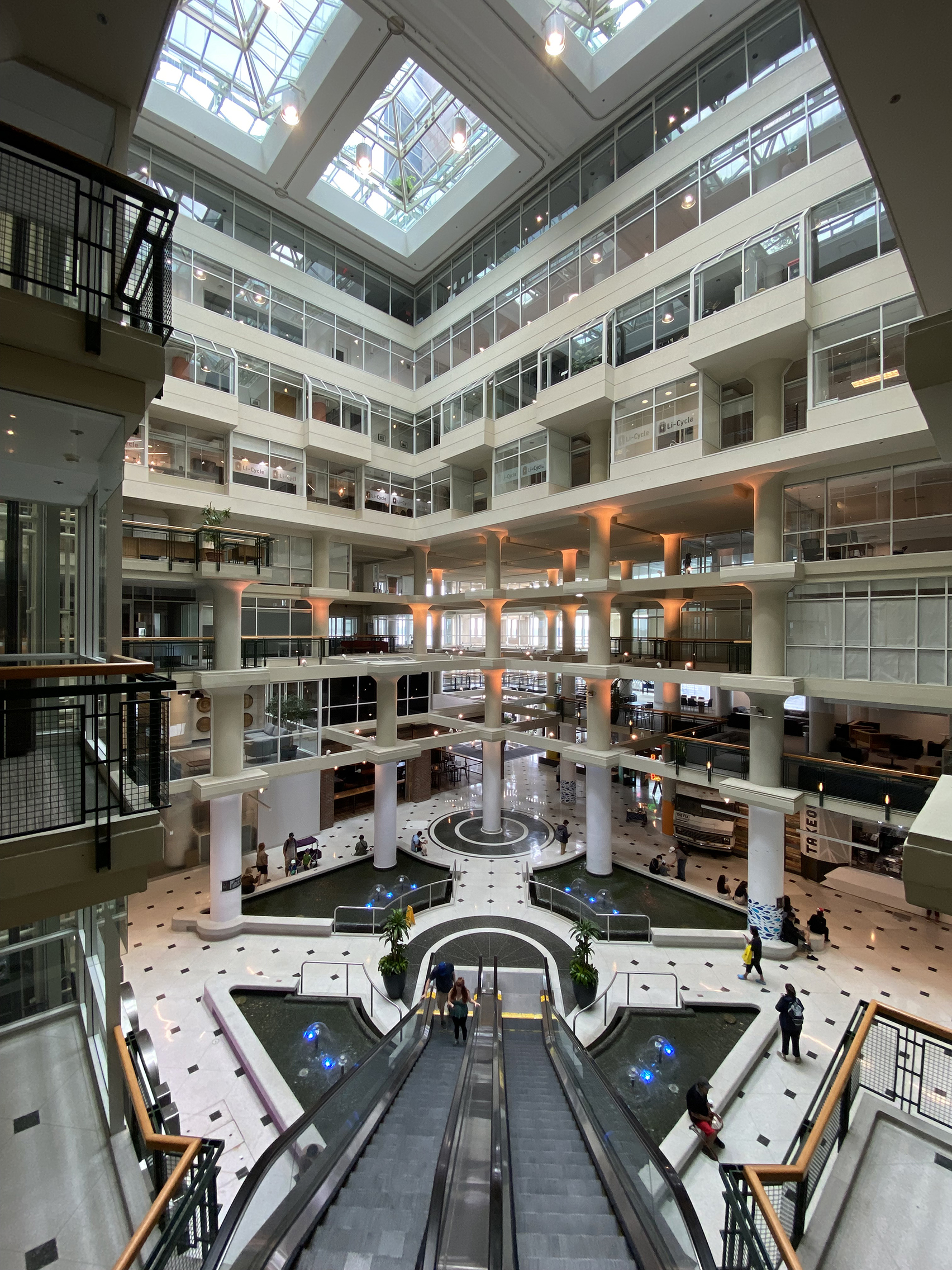
Atrium

The facility has 494,901 square feet (45,977.8 m^{2}) of retail and office space on eight floors. Yahoo! Canada, Anheuser-Busch InBev's Canadian unit Labatt and PortsToronto have offices in the building. The first floor has a grocery store, some shops and several restaurants. The second floor has offices and the Pearl Harbourfront Restaurant. The third floor is home to the Fleck Dance Theatre. The Terminal formerly was the site of the Museum of Inuit Art.

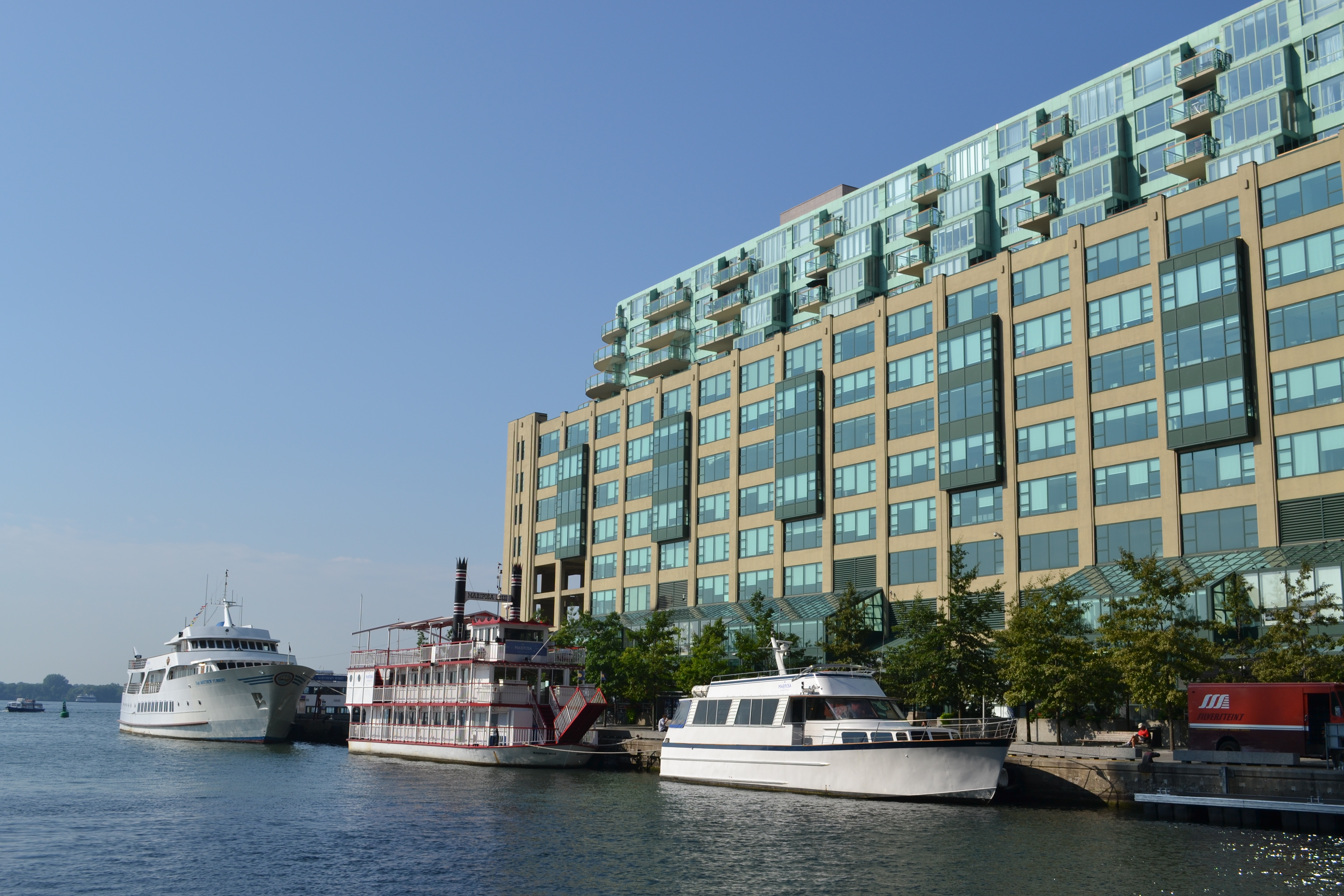
The building is located directly on Toronto Harbour

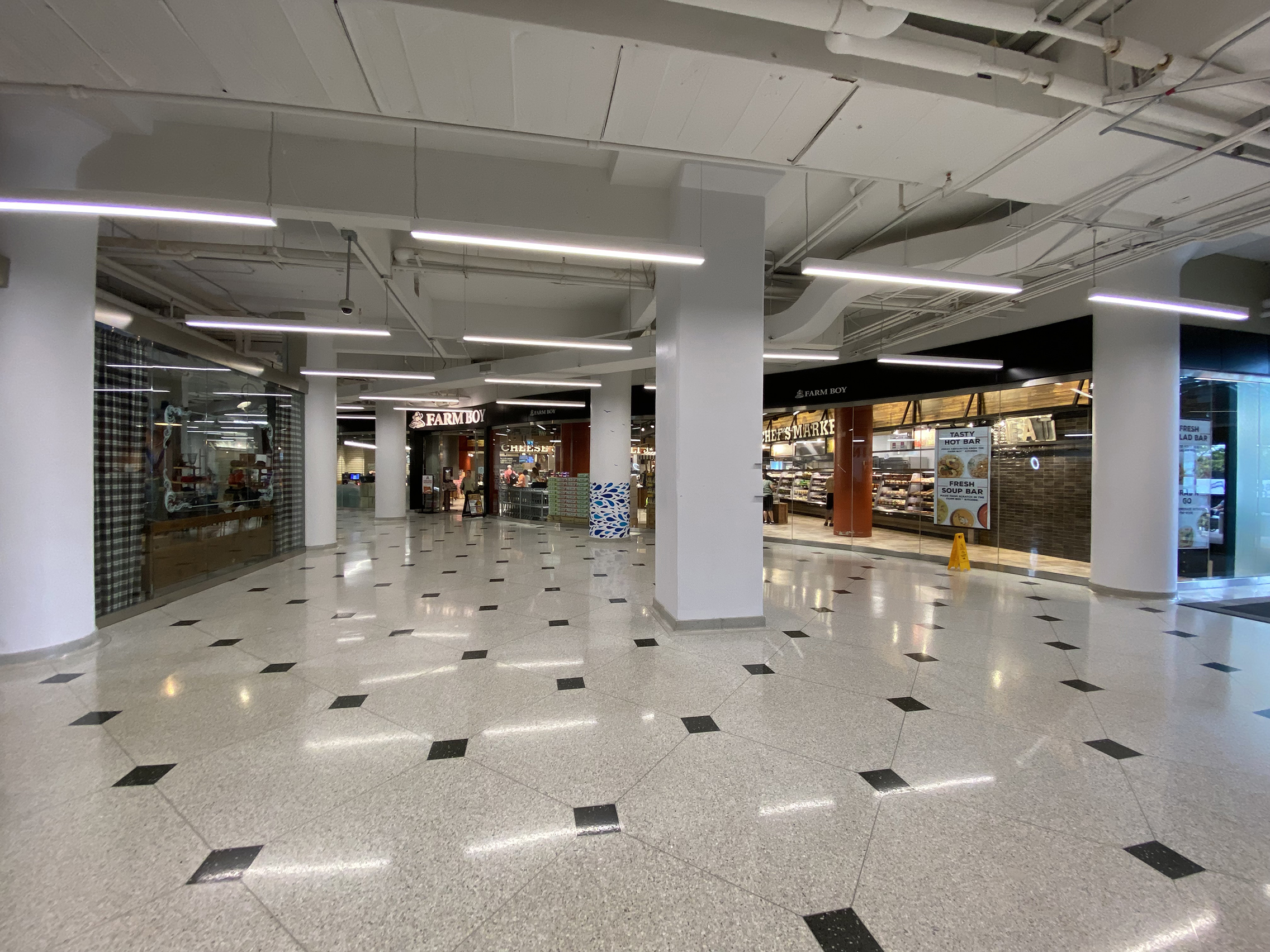
Level 1 shops

== See also ==
- Harbourfront Centre, Toronto
- Toronto waterfront
- Queens Quay station
- Toronto Island ferries
- Fulton House, Chicago, Chicago
