= Westin Harbour Castle Hotel =

Hotel in Toronto, Ontario

The Westin Harbour Castle Toronto
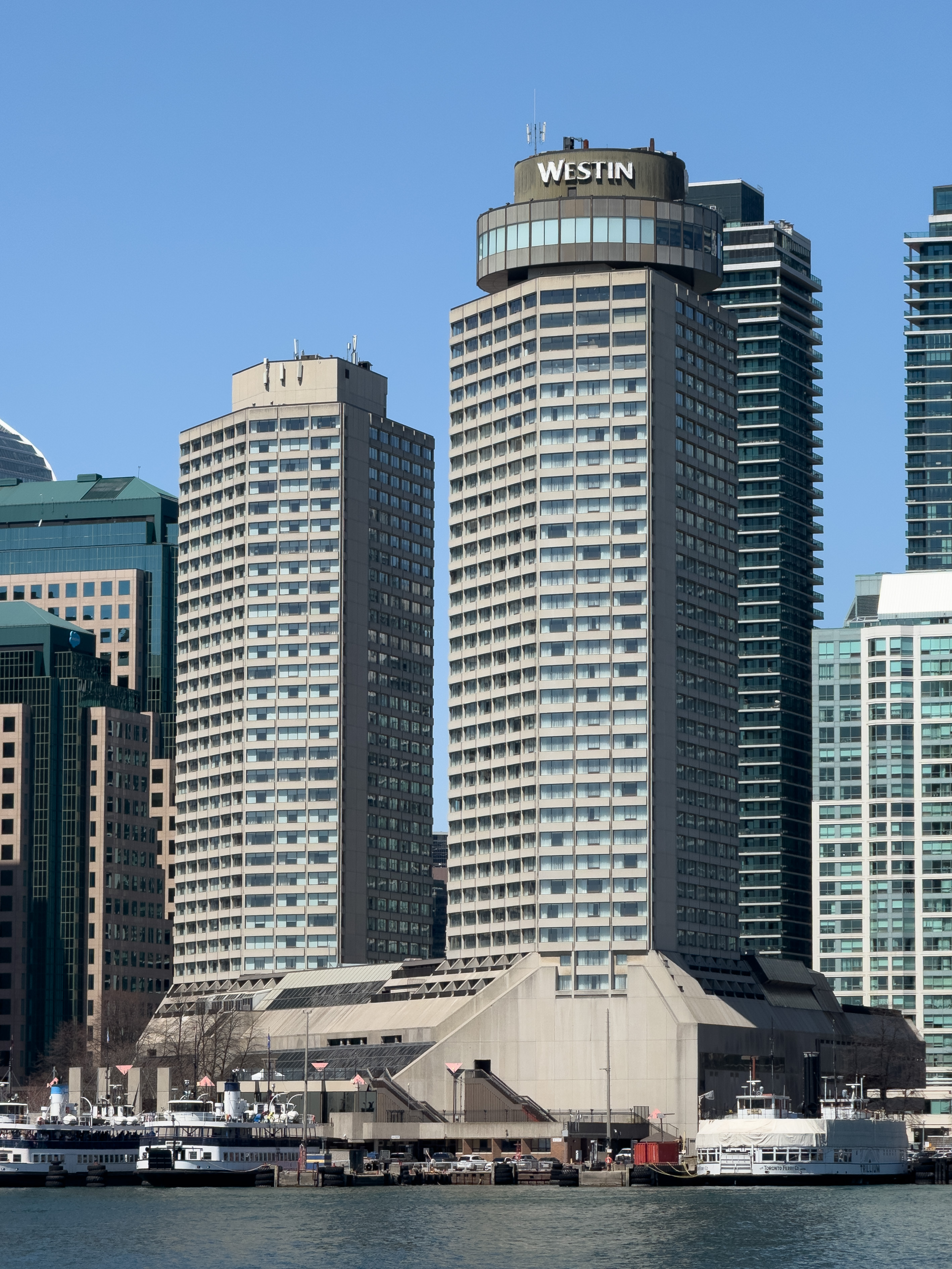
- The Westin Harbour Castle
- Interactive map of the The Westin Harbour Castle Toronto area

General information
- Location: 1 Harbour Square; Toronto, Ontario; M5J 1A6
- Coordinates: 43.640641°N 79.375716°W
- Opened: 1975

Technical details
- Floor count: 33

Other information
- Number of rooms: 977

Website
- Official website

The Westin Harbour Castle Toronto is a large hotel opened in 1975 on the waterfront of Toronto, Ontario, Canada. It is part of the Westin Hotels chain within Marriott International.

== History ==
The hotel was built by the Campeau Corporation, after Canadian real estate tycoon Robert Campeau was given permission by the city of Toronto in 1972 to turn industrial land on the city's waterfront into a 30-acre residential and commercial development. The 38-story twin-towered 963-room hotel opened in April 1975 as the Harbour Castle Hotel. Cut off from the city by the Gardiner Expressway, the hotel was at first unsuccessful, with an occupancy rate of only 46.2% in its first year and an even lower rate in its second. Hilton International assumed management in 1977, and the hotel was renamed the Toronto Hilton Harbour Castle.

Hong Kong business magnate Li Ka-Shing purchased the hotel from Campeau in 1981. In a complicated management swap in 1987, Hilton Hotels traded operation of the property for the Westin Hotel on University Avenue. The Harbour Castle became the Westin Harbour Castle Hotel, while the former Westin became the Hilton Toronto. Li sold the property to Westin Hotels in 1990.

Westin sold the hotel to the Public Sector Pension Investment Board in 2005, as part of a portfolio of five Canadian Westin hotels in Toronto, Vancouver, Calgary, Edmonton and Ottawa. PSP resold the five hotels to Starwood Capital Group in 2013 for CA$765 Million, at which point the Harbour Castle was valued in land registry documents at CA$146 million. Starwood Capital put the Harbour Castle up for sale in January 2016. When they sold their remaining Canadian Westin properties in 2018, it was reported that the Harbour Castle had sold for nearly CA$400 million.

== Facilities ==
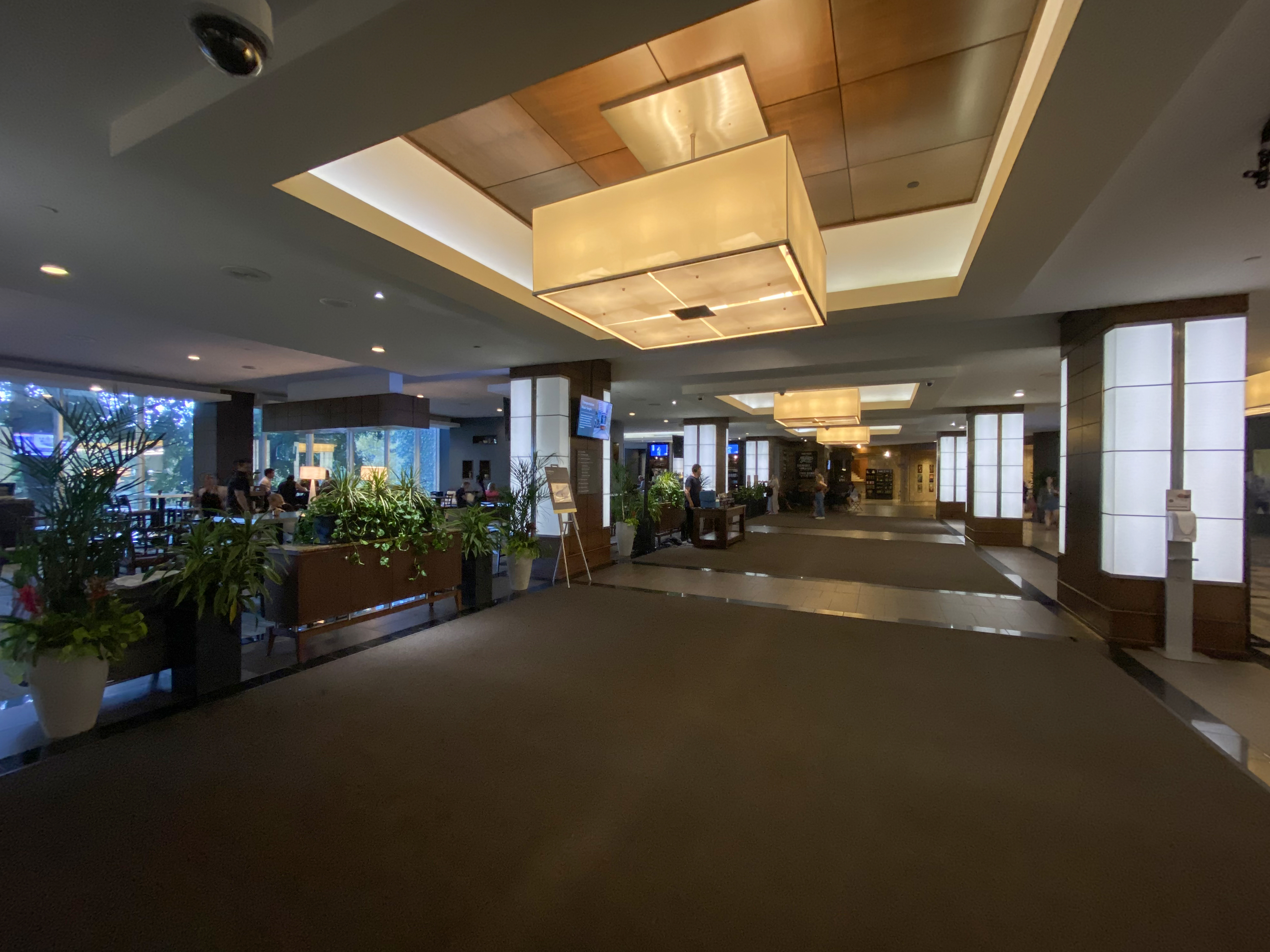
Hotel Lobby

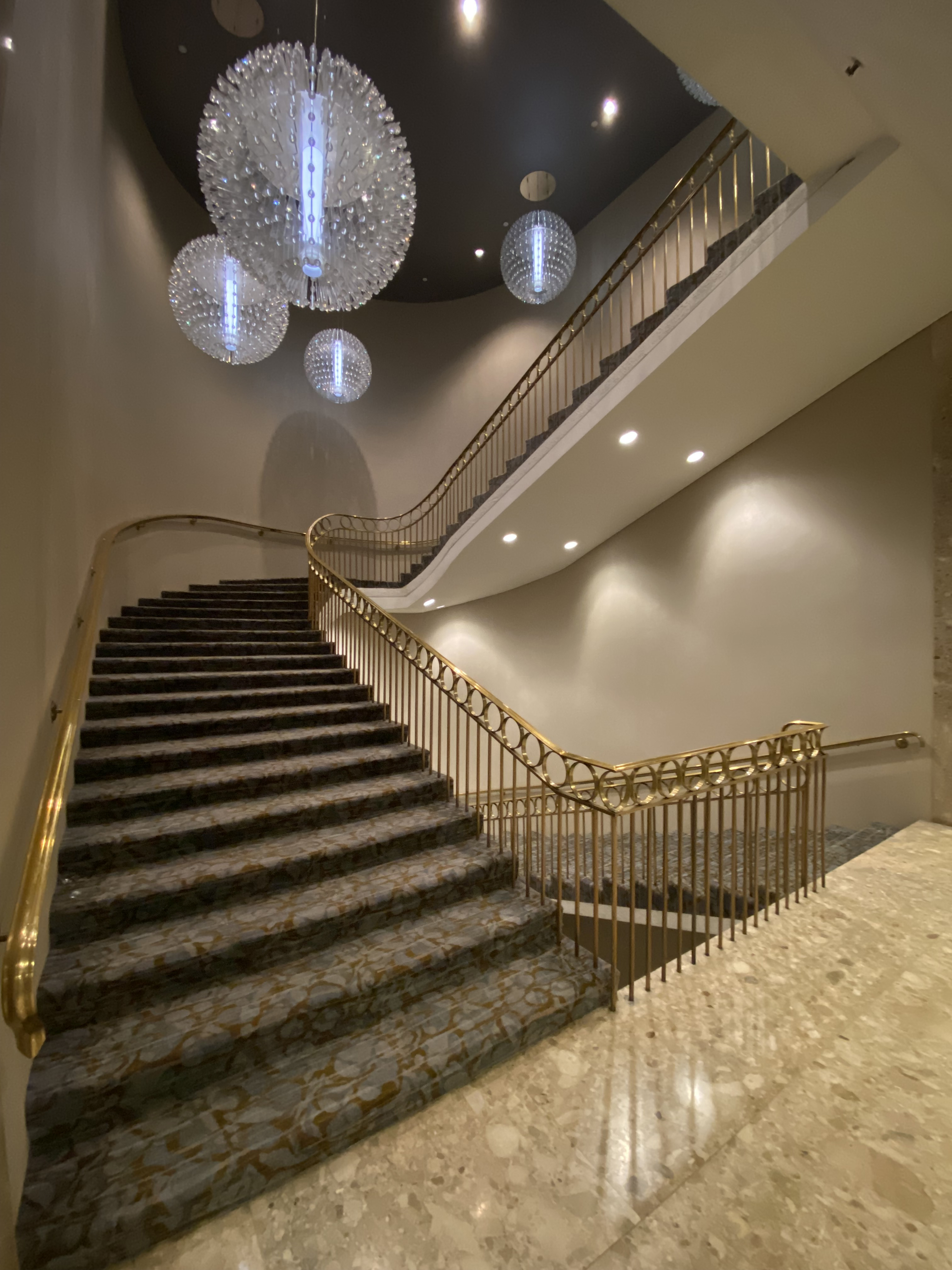
Hotel stairs to ballroom

The twin-towered 34-storey building sits along Toronto Harbour and now offers 977 rooms after a renovation in 2025. The hotel features three restaurants, including The Mizzen, The Chartroom BAr & Lounge and the acclaimed michelin-star italian restaurant, Don Alfonso 1890. The hotel also features a grab-and-go Harbour coffee bar, and Savoury, a private chef's table dining experience.

A convention centre building is attached to the hotel on the north side of Queens Quay and is accessible via an elevated glass walkway. The convention centre offers 31 rooms, including the 24,990 square feet (2,322 m^{2}) Metropolitan Ballroom. The hotel is also connected to Harbour Square condos with a glass walkway.

The hotel is located along the Yonge Street slip and shares space with the semi-retired island ferry Trillium and is adjacent to the Jack Layton Ferry Terminal.

The Westin Harbour Castle Hotel has been used for several ceremonies, including the presenting of the 32nd Genie Awards.
