= Ookwemin Minising =

Island in Toronto, Ontario, Canada

- Location within Southern Ontario

Geography
- Location: Toronto Harbour (Lake Ontario)
- Coordinates: 43.6462°N 79.3516°W
- Area: 0.396 km^{2} (0.153 sq mi)

Administration
- Canada
- Province: Ontario
- Municipality: Toronto

Ookwemin Minising

Ookwemin Minising (pronounced Oh-kway-min Min-nih-sing) is a 39.6 hectares (98 acres) artificial island in Toronto's Port Lands. It is bordered by the Keating Channel to the north, the Don River to the east and south, and Toronto Harbour to the west.

Ookwemin Minising was formed in the 2020s as part of Waterfront Toronto's flood protection and revitalization efforts in the Port Lands. As part of the project, the mouth of the Don River was rerouted and naturalized, extending it south and west into the Port Lands. This reconfiguration led to the creation of the island.

== Etymology ==
The area now called Ookwemin Minising has been known by several names since the Port Lands revitalization project began, including the Lower Don Lands, River Precinct, Cousins Quay, reflecting various phases of planning. From about 2014 to 2024, it was referred to as Villiers Island. The planning name originated from Villiers Street, a key street on the island named in the early 20th century after Villiers Sankey (1854–1905), a former City Surveyor for Toronto. Villiers Street will continue to be a prominent street on the island. In November 2024, to mark the creation of the new island, the City of Toronto officially adopted the name Ookwemin Minising as part of the Port Lands Indigenous Place Naming Initiative.

The naming involved an Indigenous Advisory Circle, which included Elders, Knowledge Keepers, language speakers, youth, and cultural leaders. The Advisory Circle brought together representatives from Anishinaabe, Haudenosaunee, and Métis backgrounds. Participants represented several nations, such as the Mississaugas of the Credit First Nation, Williams Treaty First Nations (including the Mississaugas of Curve Lake, Alderville, Hiawatha, and Scugog Island), Chippewas of Lake Simcoe (Beausoleil, Georgina Island, and Rama), Six Nations of the Grand River, and the Métis Nation of Ontario.

This name Ookwemin Minising, which translates to "place of the black cherry trees", reflects the Anishinaabemowin (Ojibwe) tradition of naming places after local flora and landscape features, as seen in other local names like "Adoobigok" (the place of the alders) near the Etobicoke Creek. Black cherry trees historically grew along the waterfront, connecting Toronto’s new island to its natural past and restoring these trees was seen to symbolize the revitalization of native ecosystems. Many black cherry trees are being planted on the island.

The initiative focused on honoring the historical and cultural significance of Indigenous peoples, particularly the traditional caretakers of the land, through the selection of a new name.

According to the Don Mouth Naturalization and Port Lands Flood Protection Project – Archeological Assessment of Existing Conditions, black cherry trees were among the species found in the complex ecosystem surrounding the lower Don River. This region supported a patchwork of diverse plant communities, including dry uplands and wet lowlands, which fostered a rich coastal wetland ecosystem comparable to other Great Lakes areas like Long Point on Lake Erie. William Henry Smith, described the landscape of the lower Don Valley in 1851, noting the presence Cherry trees among the Pine, Hemlock, Cedar, and Oak.

== History ==
=== Pre-island history ===
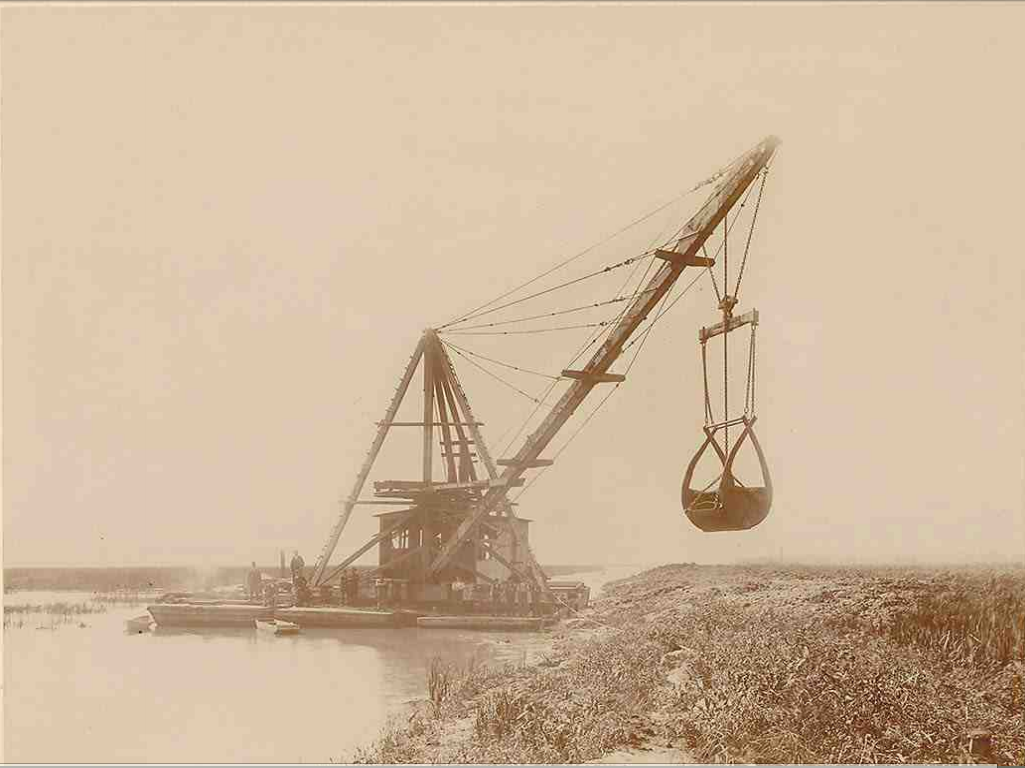
The site of Ookwemin Minising and the rest of the Port Lands were originally a marsh which was dredged and filled with landfill around the turn of the 20th century.

The island was first part of the "Ashbridge's Bay" wetlands around the original mouth of the Don River, connected to a sandbar that is now the Toronto Islands. By the turn of the 20th century, the marsh had become polluted, and the city filled it with landfill, and devoted it to industrial purposes. Some of the early twentieth century landfill was polluted, contaminated with heavy metals or toxic chemicals. The industrial enterprises were also polluting, including acres of petroleum tank farms and berms of road salt.

The city had also canalized and straightened the lower reach of the Don River, so it flowed straight for 5 kilometres (3.1 mi) from Bloor/Danforth to what is now Lake Shore Boulevard, where it made a right hand turn and ran 1 kilometre (0.62 mi) west into the Keating Channel. This right-hand turn caused a significant build-up of silt and debris that had to be removed by the port authorities regularly to minimize flooding of the surrounding area after a storm.

By 2000, the area around the mouth of the Don River had declined in usage and significant areas were vacant. These lands were not developable due to the cost of remediating the polluted lands, and the lack of flood protection. To "unlock" the area for development, Waterfront Toronto proposed to "naturalize" the mouth of the Don River. In conjunction with this, berms were built at Corktown Commons. The area between the Keating Channel and the new naturalized mouth would become a new island, Ookwemin Minising, to be redeveloped for a mix of residential and open space uses.

=== Redevelopment ===
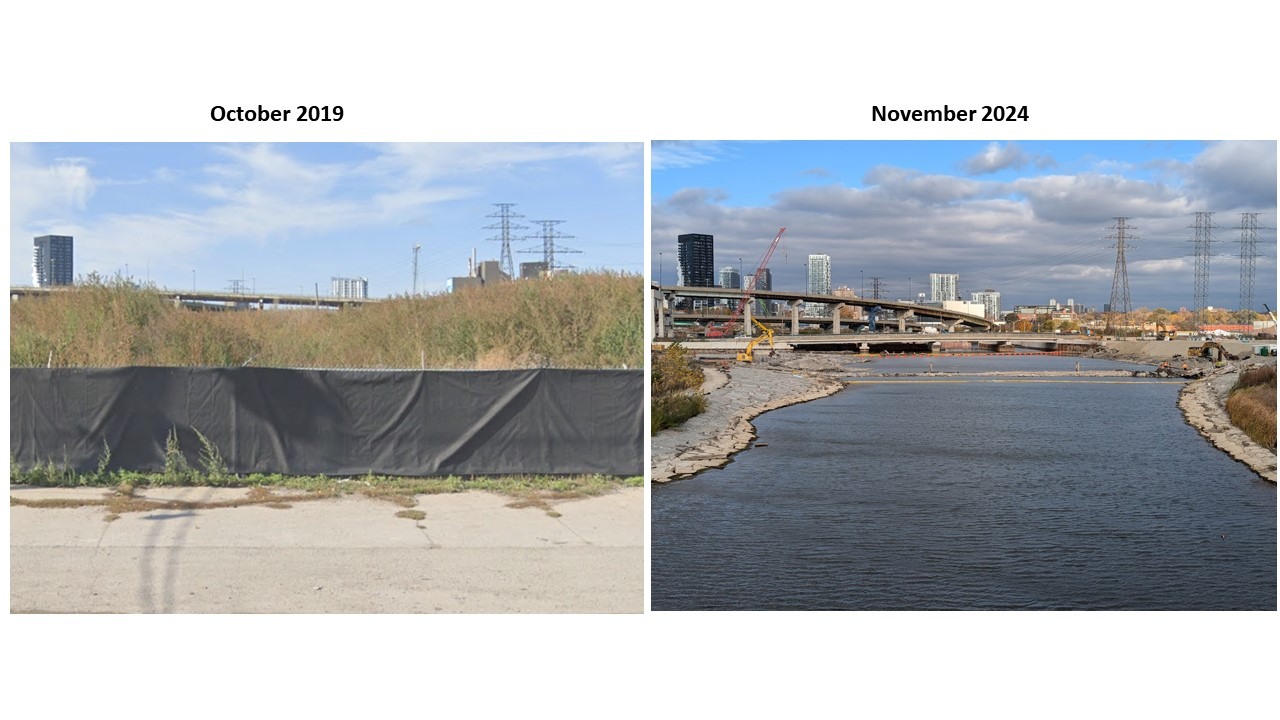
The view north from Commissioners Street in 2019 before excavation for the new river valley and creation of Ookwemin Minising, and in 2024 as the Don River was about to flow into the new river valley for the first time. The Gardiner Expressway ramps to the Don Valley Expressway can be seen to the north.

In 2007, Waterfront Toronto held an urban design contest to establish a plan for what was then called the Lower Don Lands Precinct. The competition was won by Michael Van Valkenburgh Associates’ (MMVA), which designed the precinct around a re-naturalized Don River. A preferred design for the Don Mouth was adopted by the City of Toronto in 2014, and options presented for the Villiers Island/Cousins Quay Precinct Plan.

In October 2017, the Port Lands Planning Framework and Villiers Island Precinct Plan (now Ookwemin Minising Precinct Plan) were adopted by Toronto City Council. The Port Lands Flood Protection project is being funded by all three orders of government. The design for Port Lands Flood Protection was established through an Environmental Assessment, approved in 2015. The plan established design and development objectives for the area. The plan was developed by Urban Strategies Inc. of Toronto, with support from Arup and other firms, with the City of Toronto and Waterfront Toronto. In 2024, the precinct plan was updated to update the vision from a predominantly mid-rise community to a dense, urban neighbourhood to increase the amount of affordable housing.

In November 2024, Waterfront Toronto announced it had completed the new mouth for the Don River and the City of Toronto announced the new island would formally be named Ookwemin Minising. Plans for Ookwemin Minising show a greenbelt, and parkland, surrounding a developed central area based on a grid. The developed central area will be primarily residential, with up to 9,000 units planned.

The new river channel was modelled on other natural river mouths in the Toronto area and includes significant new natural space that provides habitat for migrating birds and wildlife. The new channel empties into Toronto Harbour at what is now the Polson slip. The island lies on former industrial land, first created through landfill in the early 20th century. Several buildings were demolished or moved during construction to build the new river and parks. Buildings considered to have heritage value will be preserved. Some existing industrial uses were moved to the main shipping channel to the south.

South of Lake Shore Boulevard East, Cherry Street was relocated slightly to the west with new bridges crossing the Keating Channel. The Cherry Street lift bridge was demolished to widen the Keating Channel to improve flood conveyance during large flood events. The Don Greenway, a new river valley, was constructed south from the Don River, crossing Commissioners Street under a new bridge, and continuing south into the Ship Channel. This new channel allows high water from the Don River to flow move easily south by avoiding the 90-degree turn into the Keating Channel.

The new parkland, named Biidaasige Park opened on July 18, 2025, and people can expect to move into new housing on the island by 2031 as part of a first development phase. In 2025, the municipal, provincial, and federal governments provided $325 million each for housing on Ookwemin Minising as well as Quayside.

In April 2026, the city planners proposed a new car-free, east-west street on the island running parallel to Villiers and Commissioners Streets. The new street, dubbed Centre Commons, will be a pedestrian zone where vehicular traffic is limited to emergency vehicles and streetcars which will use part of the street for a turning loop. The street will be lined with multi-storey residential buildings.

==== Port Lands Bridges ====
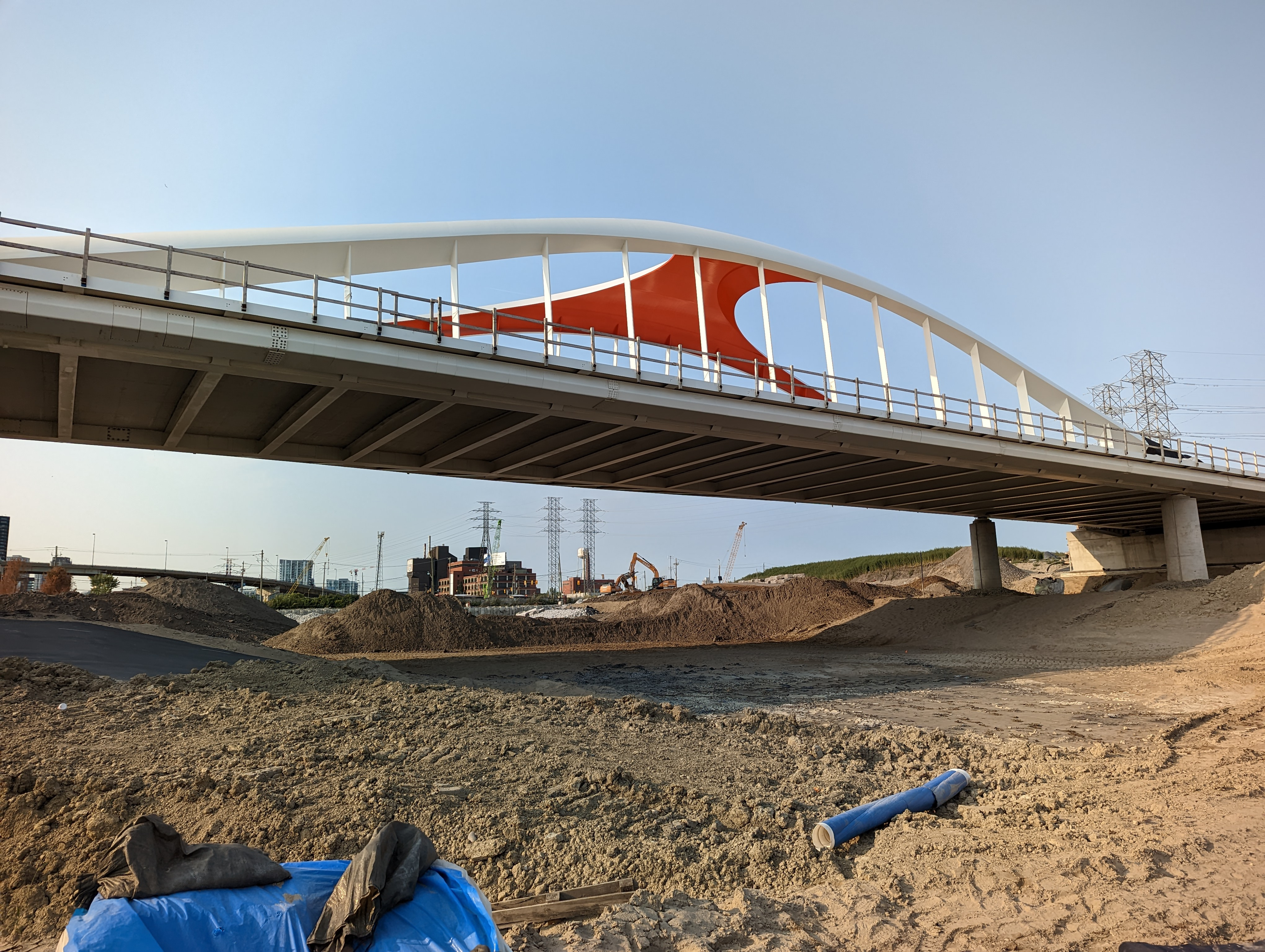
A view of the Commissioners Street Bridge in 2022 before the river valley was flooded.

Four new bridges provide three access points to Ookwemin Minising. All bridges were built by Cherubini Bridges and Structures in Dartmouth, Nova Scotia, at a total cost of CA$100 million. All three locations will have provision for future streetcar service, which may be a future expansion of the proposed Waterfront East LRT. All four bridges have the same esthetic design and each span have a curved steel dome (designed by CIG Architecture of the Netherlands) rising over the road surface. All bridge spans were pre-assembled in Dartmouth and shipped on a barge via the Saint Lawrence Seaway.

The four bridges are as follows:

- The Cherry Street North bridges are two single-span, side-by-side bridges that replaced the Cherry Street lift bridge. One bridge is for road traffic while the other will be used by pedestrians and public transit vehicles. The transit bridge could initially carry buses but was designed for streetcars.
- The Cherry Street South bridge has three spans crossing a newly created channel to run south of and roughly parallel to Commissioners Street. The Cherry Street Strauss Trunnion Bascule Bridge lies further south on Cherry Street off the island.
- The Commissioners Street bridge has four spans and was placed over a man-made channel being built as a southward extension of the Don River. Because of Seaway limitations, the bridge was shipped in two sections and joined on site.

Bridge dimensions and weight
Bridge	Length	Width	Height	Weight
Cherry Street North (transit)	57 metres (187 ft)	21 metres (69 ft)	10.21 metres (33.5 ft)	340 tonnes
Cherry Street North (road)	57 metres (187 ft)		10.21 metres (33.5 ft)	450 tonnes
Cherry Street South	111 metres (364 ft)	21 metres (69 ft)	11.15 metres (36.6 ft)	790 tonnes
Commissioners Street	153 metres (502 ft)	53 metres (174 ft)	10.16 metres (33.3 ft)	1,210 tonnes

There will be a provision for three additional bridges in the future:

- a second Commissioners Street bridge
- a second Cherry Street South bridge
- a four-span bridge at Lake Shore Boulevard

On May 6, 2024, it was announced that another bridge, called the Equinox Bridge, will be constructed to connect the island to mainland Toronto. It will be in the shape of an "S" and have an array of fanning cables.

==== Flood control ====
The island is a product of Waterfront Toronto's Port Lands Flood Protection Project. In November 2024, after six years of construction Waterfront Toronto connected the Don River to the channel forming the new mouth of the river and the island, Ookwemin Minising. Before this milestone water from the Don River made a 90-degree turn into the Keating Channel, creating a bottleneck for water and a risk of flooding.

The new channel is the primary outlet for the Don River; the Keating Channel is a secondary outlet if the need arises; and the Don Greenway is a third outlet, located south-east of the Island. The Don Greenway is a spillway and wetland situated between where the new Don River channel bends from south to west and the Ship Channel. Normally, water in the Don Greenway will only come from the Ship Channel. However, if the new Don River channel cannot handle high water volumes, then that water would be allowed to flood the Don Greenway and flow into the Ship Channel.

== Preserved buildings ==
The following structures, built throughout the twentieth century, are to be preserved as Ookwemin Minising is redeveloped.

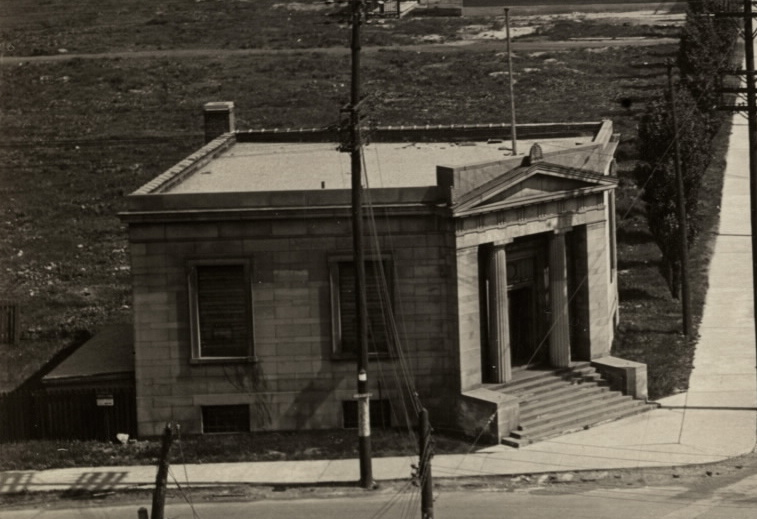
The Quantex Technology building at 309 Cherry Street (corner of Cherry and Villiers), built in the 1920s as a Bank of Montreal

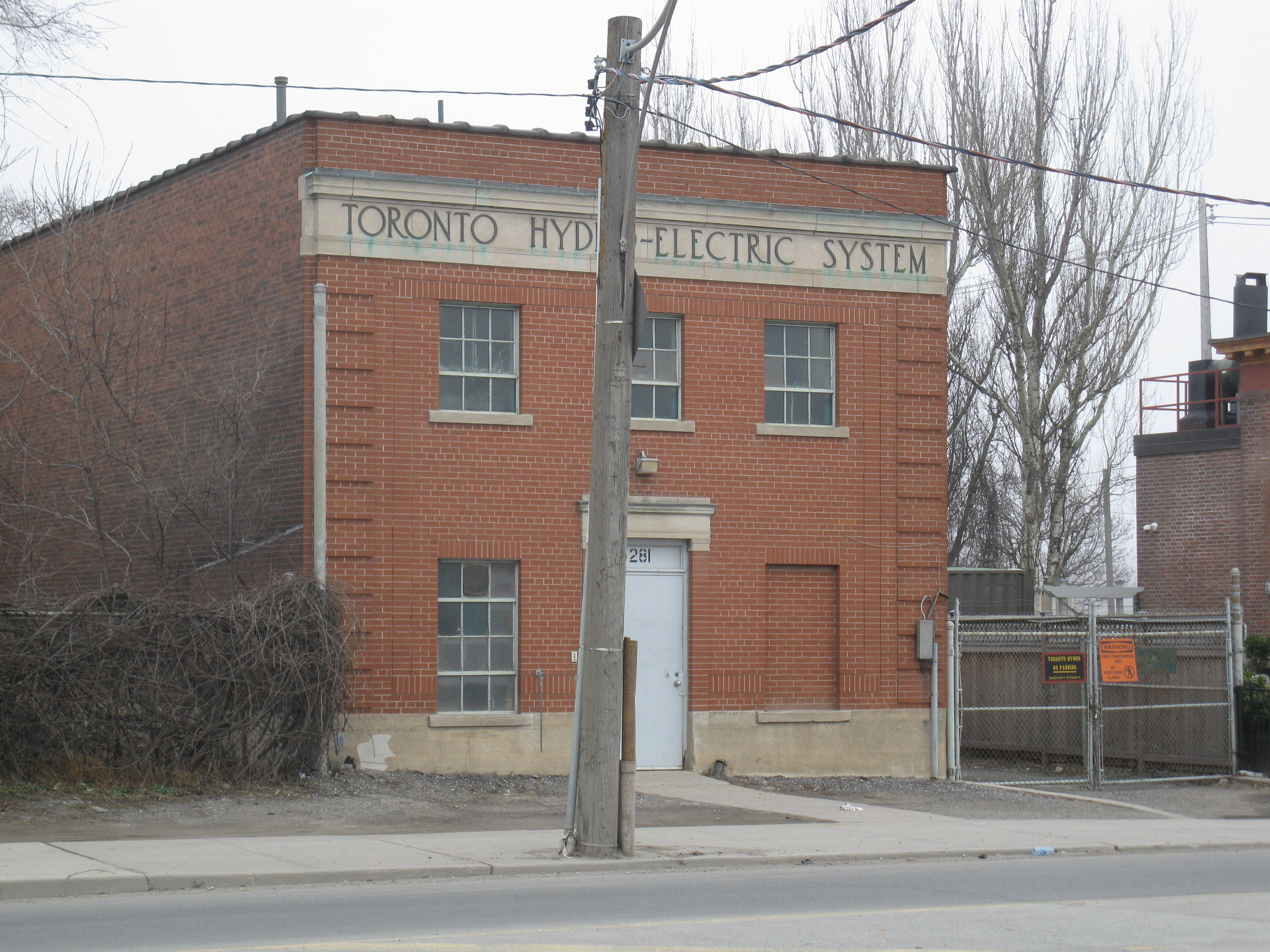
Toronto Hydro-electric building at 281 Cherry Street

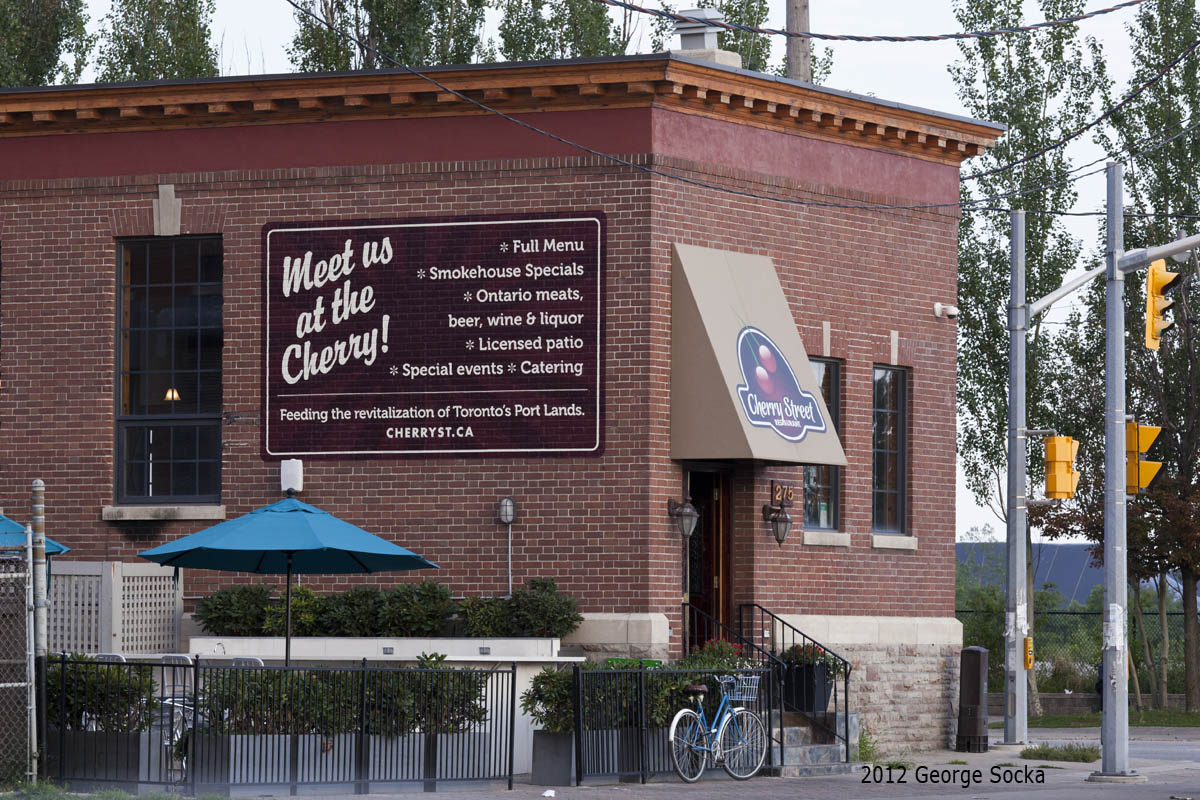
The Cherry Street Diner at 275 Cherry Street (NW corner of Cherry and Commissioner Streets): originally built as a Dominion Bank branch in 1907 and used as diner since 1940s.

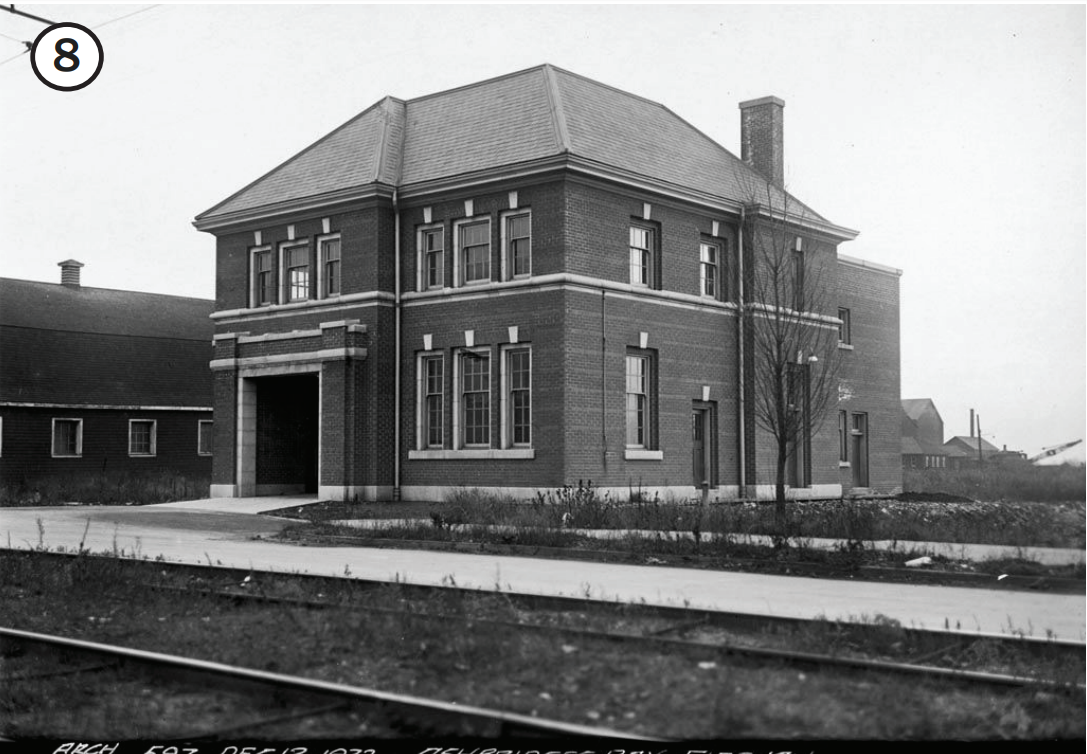
Fire Hall 30 at 39 Commissioner Street, completed in 1928, now a community centre in Biidaasige Park

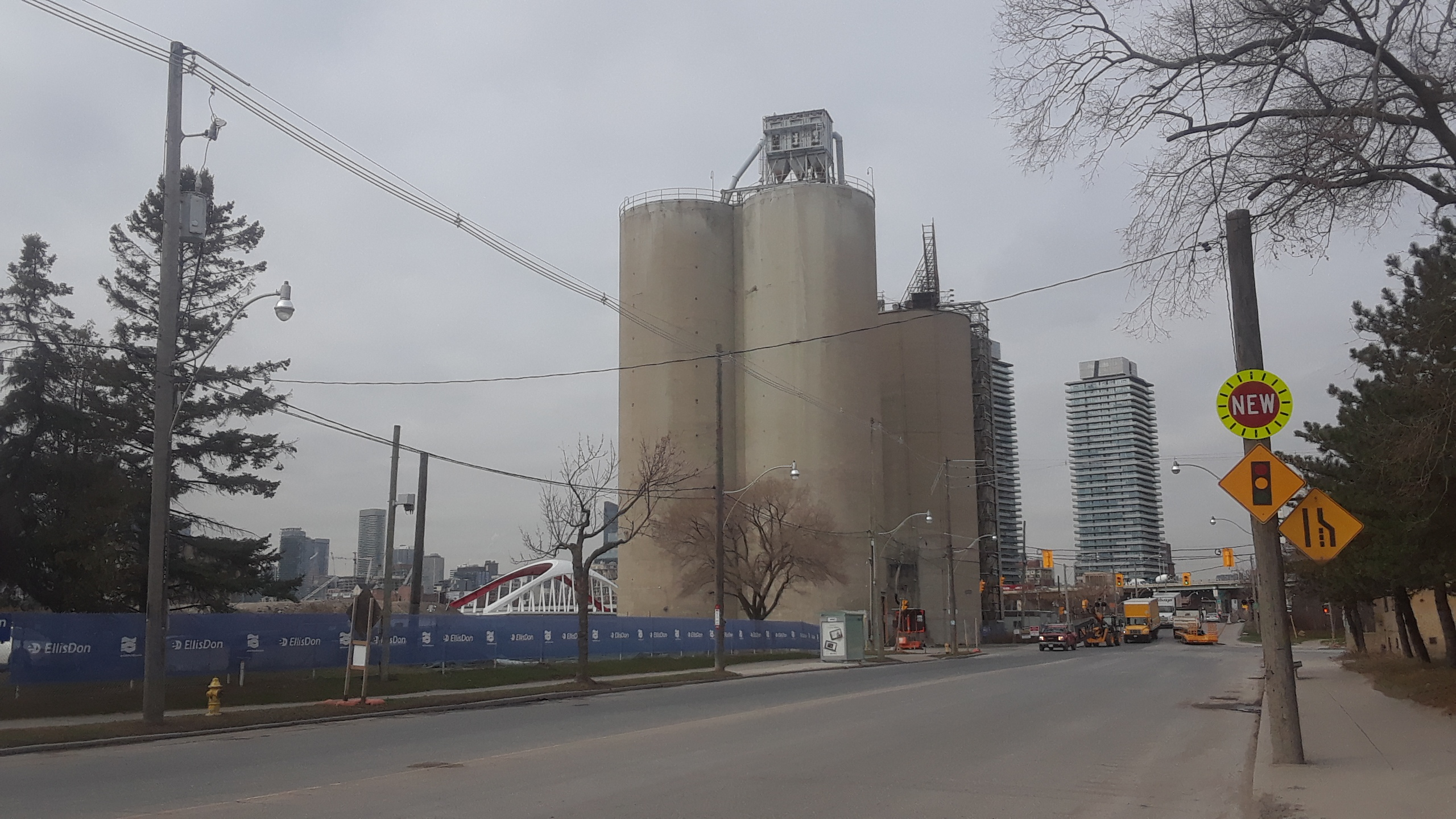
Essroc cement silo built in the 1960s
