= Biidaasige Park =

Park in Toronto, Ontario, Canada

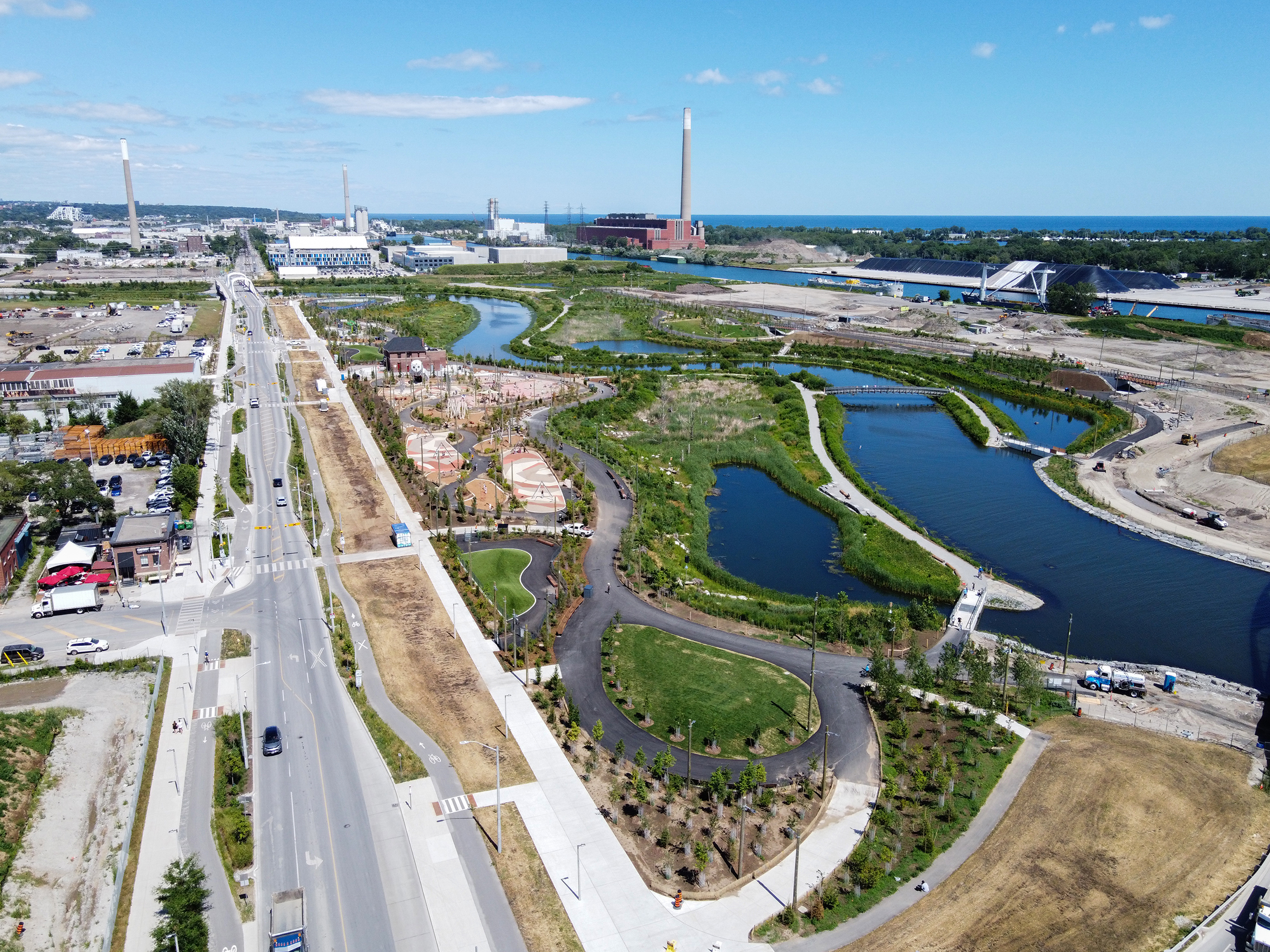
- Don River wetlands at Biidaasige Park with Commissioners Street in background

- Location within Toronto
- Type: Urban park
- Location: 51 Commissioners St, Toronto, Ontario, Canada
- Coordinates: 43°38′45″N 79°20′57″W
- Area: 20 hectares (49 acres)
- Created: 2025
- Owner: City of Toronto
- Operator: Toronto Parks and Recreation Division
- Public transit: TTC bus route 114
- Website: Biidaasige Park

Biidaasige Park (/biːˈdaːsɪɡe/) is a municipal park in Toronto, Ontario, Canada. The park is located in Toronto's Port Lands district and the park entrance is on the south side of Commissioners Street on the island of Ookwemin Minising. "Biidaasige", pronounced “bee-daw-si-geh”, means “sunlight shining toward us” in the Anishinaabemowin Indigenous language. Ookwemin Minising, pronounced Oh-kway-min Min-nih-sing, means "place of the black cherry trees."

Biidaasige Park was created as part of Waterfront Toronto's flood protection and revitalization efforts in the Port Lands. As part of the project, the mouth of the Don River was rerouted and naturalized, south and west into the Port Lands. The new river banks between Commissioners Street and Toronto Harbour became the park.

== Background ==
Prior to the 1890s, the Port Lands area was a marsh that contained the mouth of the Don River. In 1912, the Keating Channel was completed to divert the Don westward into Toronto Harbour via a 90-degree turn. Subsequently, over decades, the marsh was filled in to create an industrial area. The 90-degree turn of the Don River made the area vulnerable to flooding, preventing redevelopment in the Port Lands.

In 2001, the federal and provincial governments along with the City of Toronto, created the Toronto Waterfront Revitalization Corporation to rehabilitate and develop the city’s waterfront. It created the Port Lands Flood Protection project. Many of the industrial structures in the area were demolished in order to create a new river bed south of Commissioners Street. Construction for a new river channel was started in 2017. The new river channel effectively created a new island to be called Ookwemin Minising with the Keating Channel on its north side and the new river channel on its east and south side. Biidaasige Park would be developed on both sides of the new channel between Commissioners Street and Toronto Harbour. In 2008, landscape architects Michael Van Valkenburgh had been awarded the contract to design the park and the waterway through it. Flood protection and waterfront revitalization was a CA$1.4 billion tri-government investment, with the federal government contributing over CA$465 million, and the provincial and municipal governments each contributing over CA$471 million. There were 5,000 trees, 77,000 shrubs and two million perennials planted throughout the park. The project cost was about CA$1.4 billion. An initial section of the park opened to the public on July 18, 2025. A second section of the park between Cherry Street and the harbour opened on July 24, 2026.

== Description ==
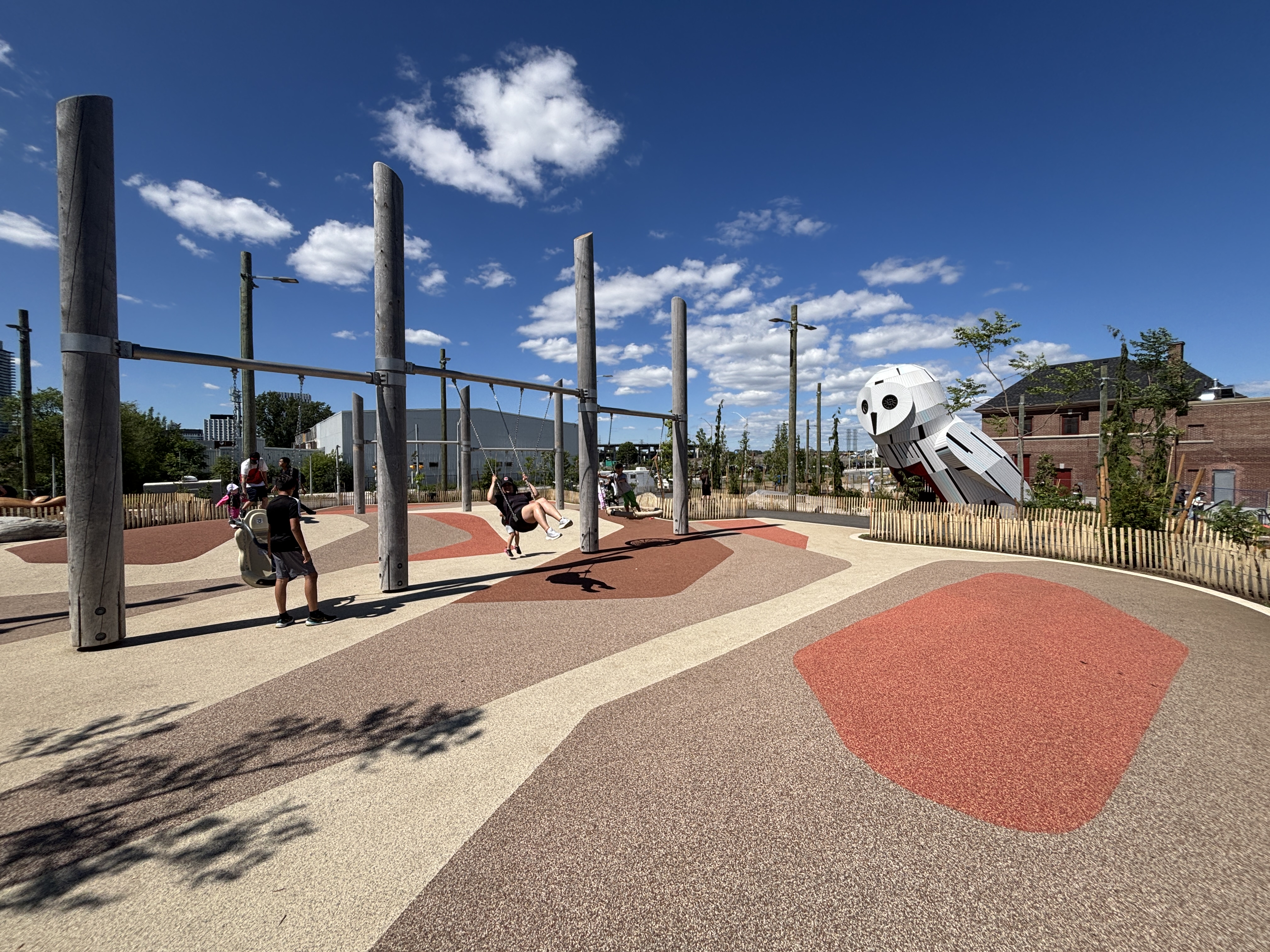
Snowy Owl children's amphitheater at Biidaasige Park

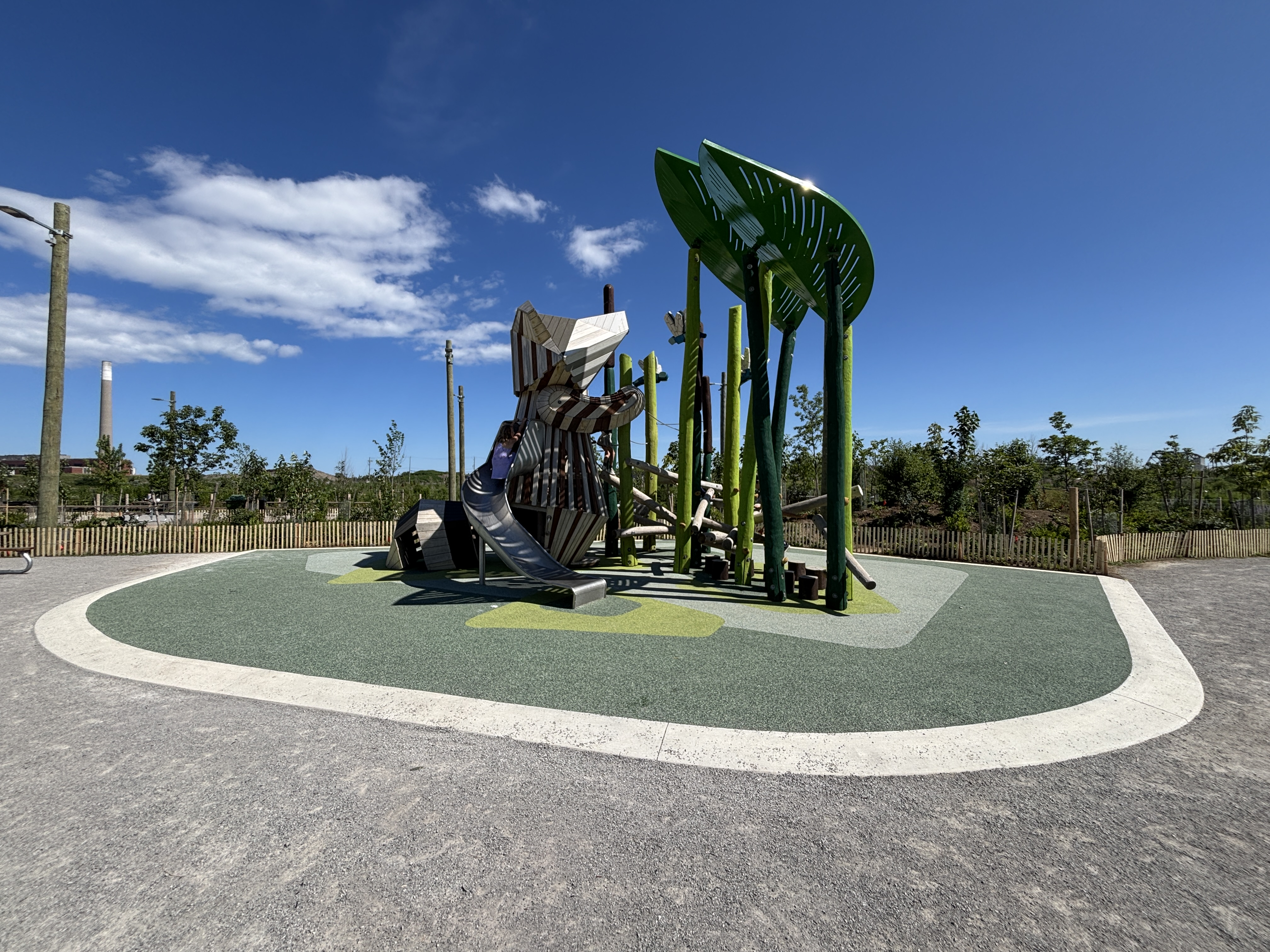
Raccoon Picnic Terrace

The park occupies an area of 20 hectares (49 acres) with the Don River passing through it, and provides a natural habitat for wildlife including birds, small animals and fish. Within the river landscape, pedestrian paths run along the river and bridges cross it. While the landscape looks natural, it is completely man-made. The park features several children's playgrounds with different themes:

- Cableway Canyon with 20 and 40-metre cableways,
- Woodland Scramble with dodem animal sculptures created in consultation with local Indigenous people,
- Badlands Scramble simulating Cheltenham Badlands, with child-activated water feature,
- Snowy Owl Theatre with a giant statue of an owl containing a stage for a children's amphitheater,
- Raccoon Picnic Terrace with a 10-metre (33 ft) tall statue of a racoon enclosing a children's slide.

The largest structure in the park is Old Fire Hall 30 Community Recreation Centre at 39 Commissioners Street. The former firehall was built in the 1920s and ceased operation as a firehall in 1980. It was used by the Toronto Firefighter’s Association until 2015 after which the building was used by various small businesses. To preserve the building and to adapt it for park use, it was subsequently moved 24 metres (78 ft) back and placed on higher ground. Opening in late 2025, the building will provide washrooms and meeting rooms for park visitors.

The park has two picnic areas with tables and barbecues called Raccoon Picnic Terrace and the River View Picnic Terrace. Each picnic table can seat up to 40 people. A food pavilion is expected to open in 2026.

On the Ookwemin Minising side, the park has two off-leash areas for dogs, both provide seating, dog-rated artificial turf, water fountains and accessible pathways and gates. Along the river, the park has pedestrian and cycling paths, locations for fishing and birdwatching, and slips to launch non-motorized boats.

On July 24, 2026, the park was extended west of Cherry Street providing an extra 4 hectares (9.9 acres) of parkland. The extension features Canoe Cove for canoes and kayaks, a 3,000-person event lawn, the western portion of the Lassonde Art Trail and a waterside promenade along the eastern edge of Toronto Harbour. Atlas Crane is a heritage feature; the decommissioned crane was used at Marine Terminal 35 to load and unload cargo including old Toronto streetcars to be shipped to Egypt.

== See also ==
- Don Valley Brick Works with a quarry converted into parkland
