= Cherry Street Strauss Trunnion Bascule Bridge =

Bascule bridge in Toronto, Canada

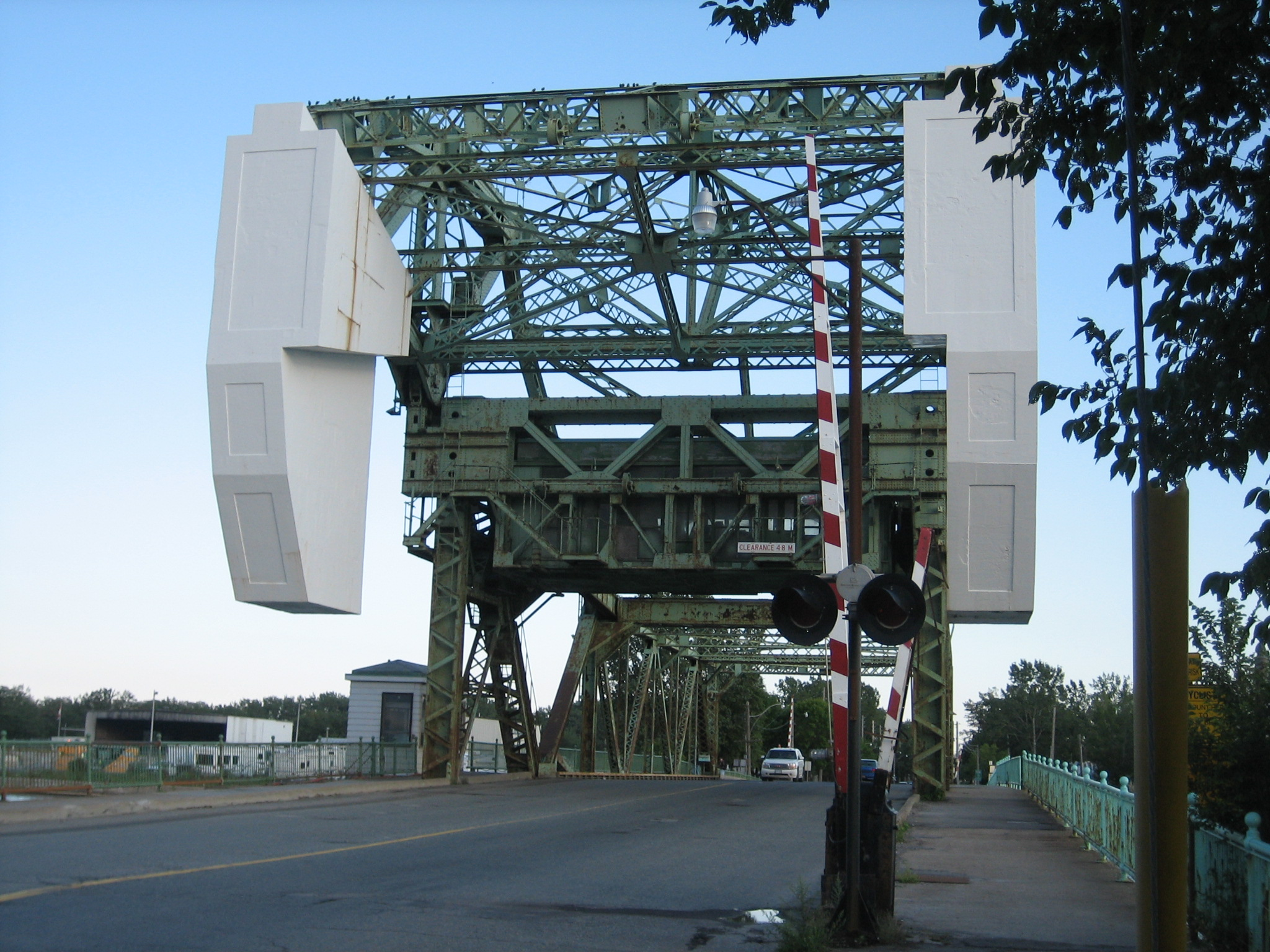
- The Cherry Street Bascule Bridge
- Coordinates: 43°38′29″N 79°20′56″W
- Carries: vehicular and pedestrian
- Crosses: Toronto Harbour Shipping Channel
- Locale: Toronto
- Other name: Cherry Street Bridge
- Owner: Ports Toronto
- Maintained by: Ports Toronto
- Heritage status

Ontario Heritage Act
- Type: listed
- Designated: February 25, 1992

Characteristics
- Design: Bascule
- Material: Steel
- Total length: 120 metres (390 ft)
- Width: 20 metres (66 ft)
- Height: 48 metres (157 ft)
- Longest span: 40 metres (130 ft)
- Clearance above: (?) Clearance above the deck
- Clearance below: No limit when the bridge is open (Toronto Harbour Ship Channel)

History
- Architect: Joseph Strauss
- Constructed by: Dominion Bridge Company
- Construction end: 1930
- Construction cost: CA$500,000

Location
- Interactive map of Cherry Street Strauss Trunnion Bascule Bridge

The Cherry Street Strauss Trunnion Bascule Bridge is a bascule bridge and Warren truss in Toronto, Ontario, Canada. Located in the industrial Port Lands area, it carries Cherry Street over the Toronto Harbour Ship Channel and opens to allow ships to access the channel and the turning basin beyond. There was previously another bascule bridge further north on Cherry Street. The other, smaller bridge, crossed the Keating Channel, while this bridge crosses the Ship Channel.

The bridge was built in 1930 by the company of Joseph Strauss and the Dominion Bridge Company. The north side of the bridge has 750-ton concrete counterweights that allow the bridge to pivot to open. The bridge uses 500 tons of steel in its construction. The bridge is designed to carry two lanes of traffic. It cost CA$500,000 ($9.58 million in 2023 dollars) to build. It was officially opened on June 29, 1931 by Toronto Mayor William Stewart. The bridge was listed under the Ontario Heritage Act by the City of Toronto in 1992 as architecturally historical.

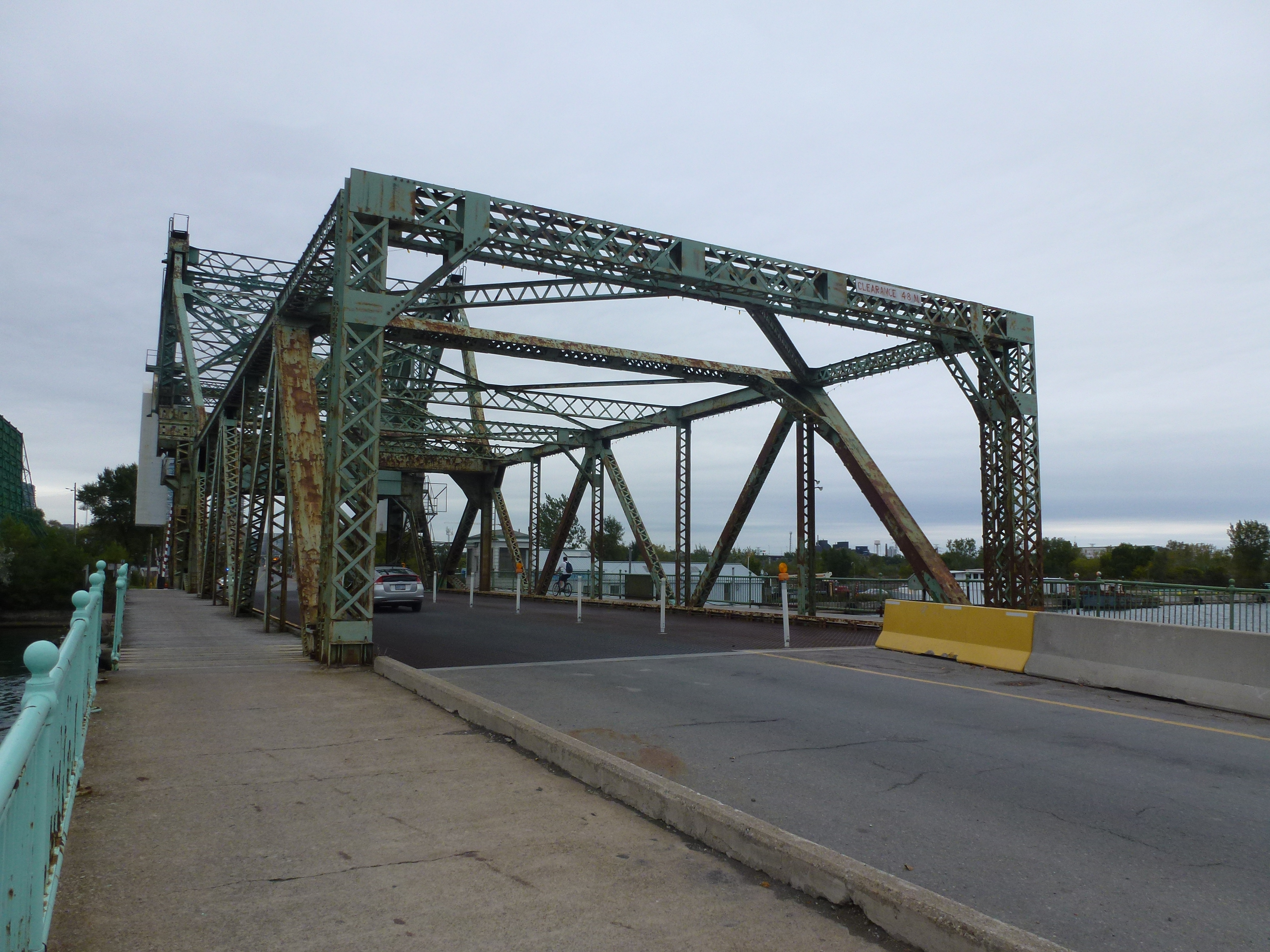
The bridge's south end in 2013

The city spent CA$2.5 million to refurbish the bridge in 2007. The Toronto Port Authority made further repairs from December 2012 to September 2013 at a cost of CA$2 million.

In 2021 the City entered into a funding agreement with PortsToronto (the "Owner") for the rehabilitation of the Cherry Street Ship Channel bridge approach spans and the Bascule bridge along with the authority to fund, from the approved 2021-2030 Transportation Services Capital Budget, the costs of the design and construction of these works, expected to total approximately $22.0 million over a period expected to be 2021-2025. In addition, and during the same timeframe, PortsToronto will rehabilitate the bridge's lifting mechanisms (mechanical and electrical) at a total cost of approximately $12.0 million. As of fall 2023, the City work on the approaches and foundations was almost complete and the bridge’s metalwork was to be repaired and repainted in 2024; however, As of 22 June 2025, that phase of work was still in progress.

== See also ==
- Cherry Street lift bridge
- Villiers Island § Bridges
- List of bascule bridges
