= Cherry Street lift bridge =

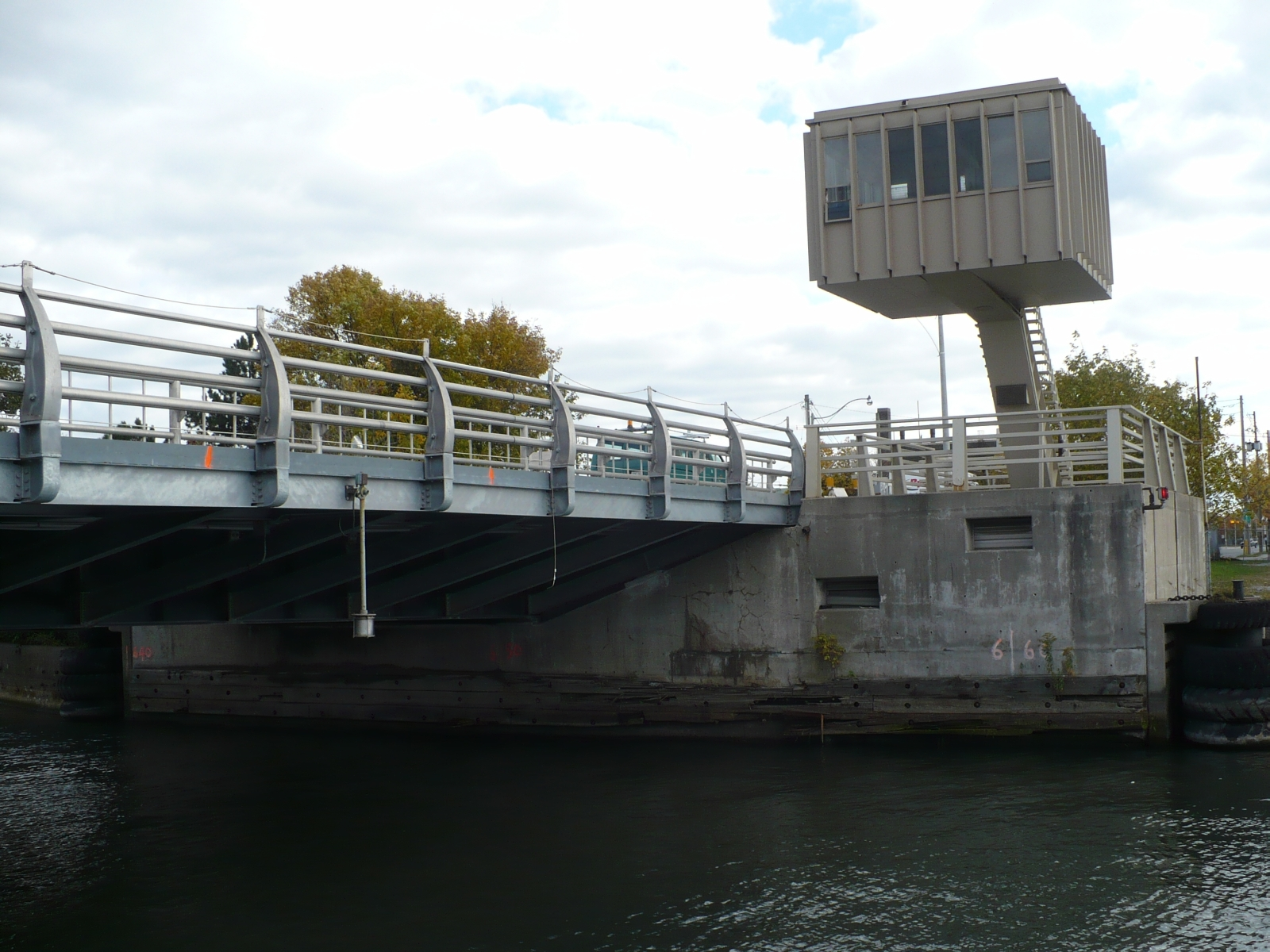
- Cherry Street lift bridge over the Keating Channel in 2008
- Coordinates: 43°38′51″N 79°21′15″W
- Carries: vehicular and pedestrian
- Crosses: Keating Channel
- Locale: Toronto
- Owner: City of Toronto
- Maintained by: Toronto Port Authority

Characteristics
- Design: Bascule
- Material: Steel
- Total length: 29 metres (95.1 ft)
- Height: 48 metres (157.5 ft)
- Clearance above: (?) above deck
- Clearance below: No limit when the bridge is open

History
- Architect: R. M. Bremner
- Designer: R. M. Bremner
- Engineering design by: R. M. Bremner, City of Toronto engineer W. Sefton & Associates, Structural Engineer
- Constructed by: Ruliff Grass Construction Co. Ltd
- Construction end: 1968

Location
- Interactive map of Cherry Street lift bridge

The Cherry Street lift bridge over the Keating Channel was the smaller of two bascule lift bridges on Cherry Street, in Toronto, Ontario, Canada. The bridge spanned the canalized mouth of the Don River where it empties into Toronto Harbour. It was the fourth bridge at that location, before being replaced by the Cherry Street North bridge.

== History ==
The City of Toronto government once operated a swing bridge over the Keating Channel at or near Cherry Street. The current bridge, constructed in 1968, is a vehicle and pedestrian bascule bridge, with a metal mesh deck. The original swing bridge was made of wood, and only carried a single rail line, operated by the Grand Trunk Railway.

The City solicited a bid for the first swing bridge in 1896. Contractors were allowed to propose either a metal or wood bridge. The Privy Council of Canada approved funding of the bridge in 1900. The two spans were 52 feet (15.85 m) long, which was considered sufficient to accommodate navigation on the river." The wooden bridge was replaced by steel draw bridges in 1912 and 1932.

As originally constructed the bridge supported two lanes of traffic in each direction, and had a 1.8-metre (5.9 ft) sidewalk on the west side. In 1995, several changes were made to provide "enhanced safety for cyclists, skaters, and pedestrians." As-built the entire deck of the bridge, including the sidewalk, was a steel mesh. In 1995 vehicle traffic was restricted to one lane in each direction to make room for a 2-metre (6.6 ft) sidewalk on the east side of the bridge, and the expansion of the sidewalk on the west side to 3.6 metres (12 ft) so it could accommodate bicycles as well as pedestrians. The sidewalks were faced with a non-slip plastic fibreglass surface.

In 2006, an inspection showed that the bridge required CA$2 million in repairs to corrosion damage. The repairs were completed in April 2007. Key bearings in the bridge broke in 2010; it took time for replacement bearings to be found in Sweden. The bridge wasn't restored to working order until June 27, 2011.

On August 1, 2019, the bridge failed to lower. It remained locked in its upright position for several weeks. A crane was used to lower the bridge to the horizontal position. The bridge was quickly repaired, however its lifting mechanisms were badly damaged as a result.

== Future ==
The City of Toronto government's long-term plans are to "renaturalize" the mouth of the Don River. Under this plan the Keating Channel will be retained, due to its historic value, but a new more natural-appearing channel would be constructed south of the Keating Channel.

The current bridge was replaced by the new Cherry Street North bridges. The pre-fabricated spans for the two side-by-side bridges were delivered in 2022, and one of the spans was opened for road traffic in early 2024, while the other span will be reserved for a future light-rail transit. The bridge is currently being demolished.

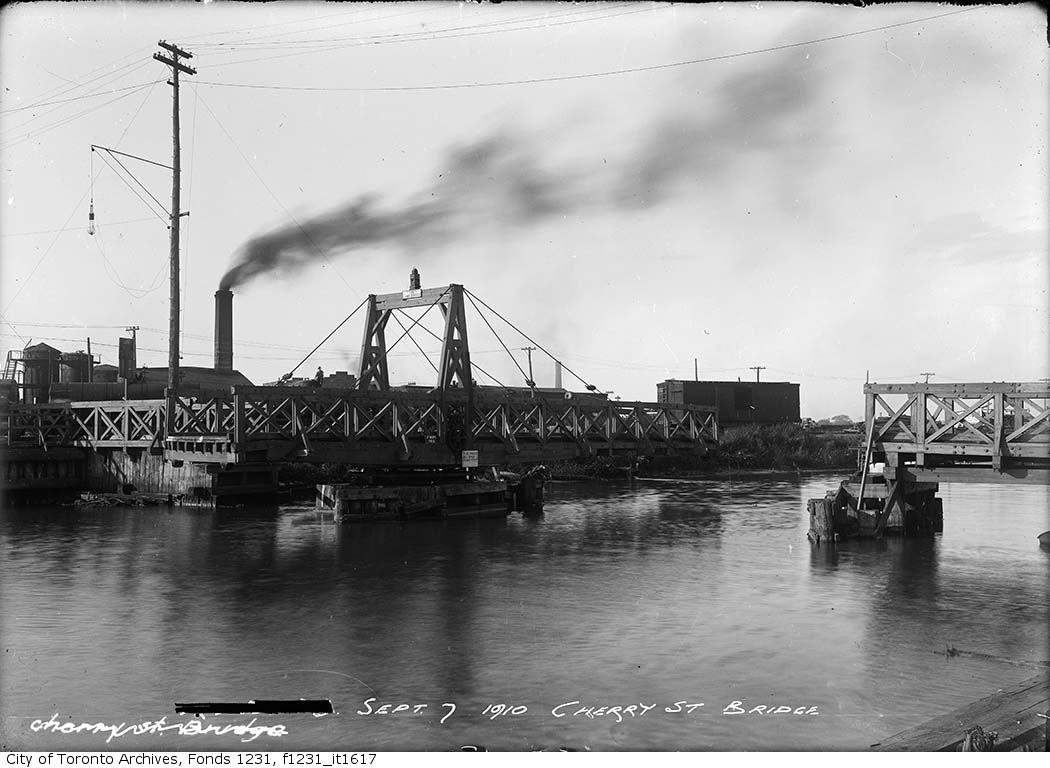
Wooden swing bridge over the Keating Channel in 1910.

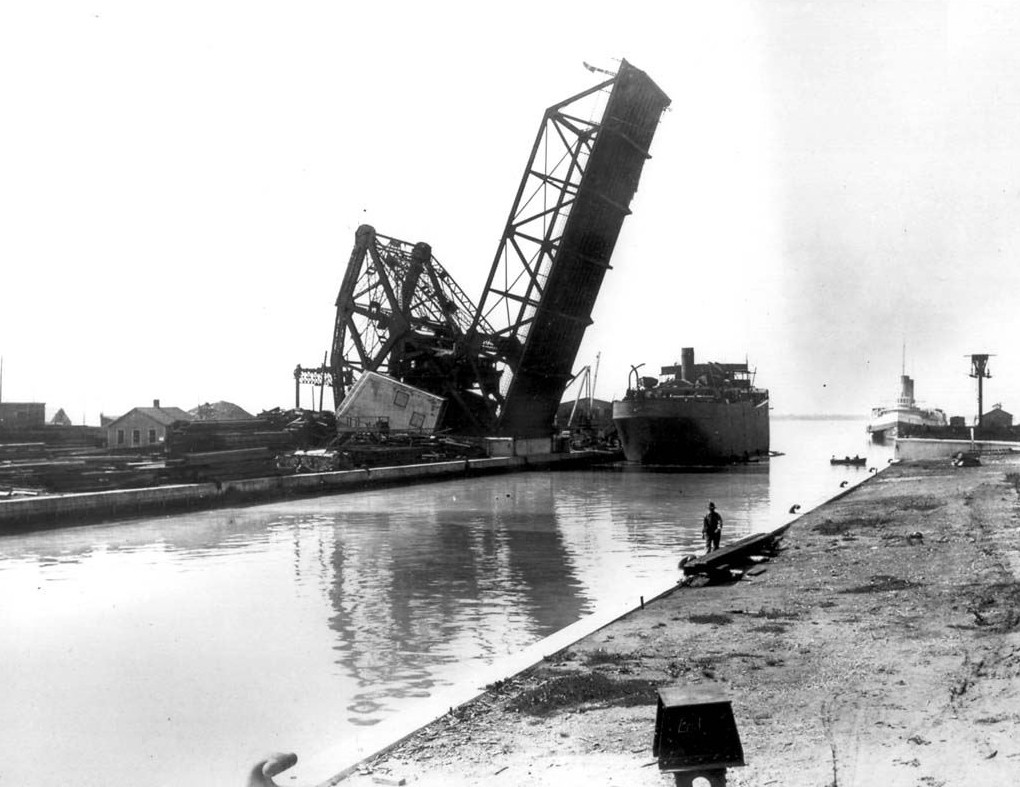
1912 draw bridge

== See also ==
- Cherry Street Strauss Trunnion Bascule Bridge
