= Waterfront East LRT =

Proposed Toronto streetcar line

Overview
- Status: Planned
- Owner: Toronto Transit Commission
- Locale: Toronto, Ontario
- Termini: Union station; Ookwemin Minising

Service
- Type: Streetcar
- System: Toronto streetcar system
- Operator: Toronto Transit Commission

Technical
- Track gauge: 4 ft 10 7/8 in (1,495 mm) – TTC gauge

The Waterfront East LRT, formerly known as the East Bayfront LRT, is a planned Toronto streetcar line that would serve the East Bayfront and Port Lands areas in Toronto, Ontario, Canada. It would run from Union station under Bay Street and along Queens Quay and Cherry Street to a new loop along Commissioners Street east of Cherry Street on Ookwemin Minising. It would complement the existing 509 Harbourfront service that connects Union Station to Queens Quay west of Bay Street. Longer-term plans are to extend the East Bayfront line from Cherry and Commissioners Streets to the planned East Harbour Transit Hub along GO Transit's Lakeshore East line and the planned Ontario Line.

The Waterfront East LRT extension is a City of Toronto project to develop the East Bayfront LRT. The project involves both Waterfront Toronto and the Toronto Transit Commission. The proposed line is part of the Waterfront Transit Network which also includes the Waterfront West LRT.

As of July 2025, the project's design was 60 percent complete. Design work would cost the city $135 million. If construction were to be funded, the line could open in the early to mid-2030s, according to planning staff. In March 2026, the federal, provincial and municipal governments each agreed to contribute $1 billion to cover the $3 billion estimated cost for the project. In 2023, planners had hoped for a partial line opening along Queens Quay East between 2030 and 2033 but with Union station bypassed. The project would have fully opened sometime between 2032 and 2035.

== Route ==
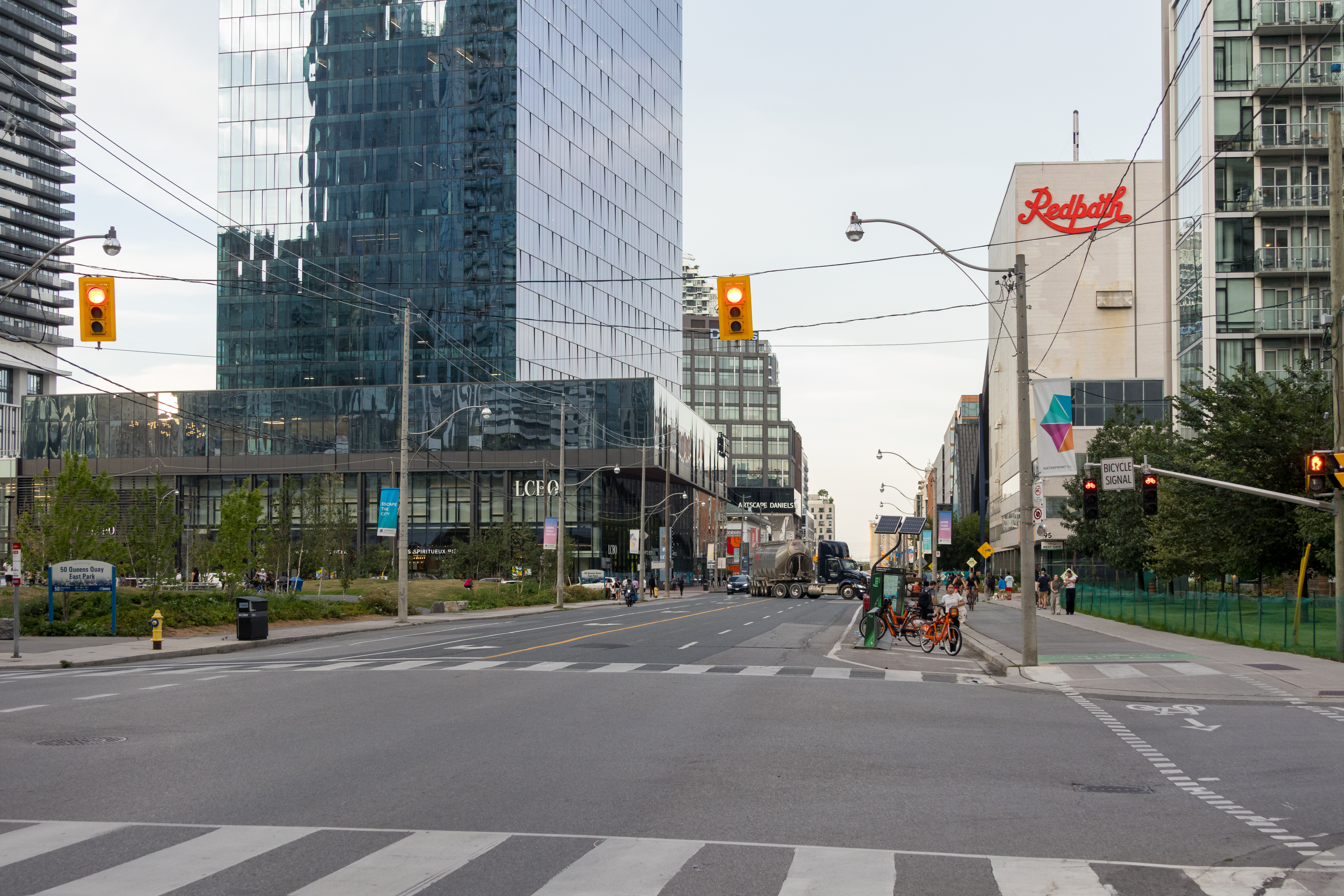
Portion of Queens Quay East the Waterfront East LRT would follow

The proposed line would start at the underground loop at Union Station and proceed underground in the existing streetcar tunnel under Bay Street to Queens Quay. The line would then turn east and emerge from the tunnel on Queens Quay just west of Yonge Street. The line would continue east to a relocated Cherry Street, where it would turn south to Commissioners Street then east on Commissioners Street to terminate at a new loop running via New Munitions, Centre and Villiers Park Streets – all new streets to be constructed on Ookwemin Minising. All tracks for the new line east of the Bay Street tunnel would be in a dedicated right-of-way.

Platform and track configurations
- Existing Union station platform
- Proposed Union station platforms

As part of the project, the underground streetcar stations at Union Station and Queens Quay would be expanded. At Union Station, the existing streetcar platform at the head of the loop would be replaced by four new platforms, more specifically two platforms along each side of the loop's neck under Bay Street. Also along the neck, there would be two bypass tracks and switchwork so that any streetcar entering the station or leaving a platform could bypass any other streetcar waiting at a platform. On the south side of Queens Quay station, there would be a double-track wye junction to replace the existing curve. From Queens Quay station, southbound streetcars would be able to branch either east or west along Queens Quay. Streetcars could also continue along Queens Quay, bypassing Queens Quay station. A new tunnel portal would be constructed on Queens Quay on the west side of Yonge Street. Both the eastbound and westbound tracks would be in a dedicated right-of-way along the south side of Queens Quay so as to reduce the need for rail vehicles to stop for road traffic as there are fewer street intersections on the south side of Queens Quay than on its north side.

Waterfront Toronto has constructed Ookwemin Minising, an island in the Port Lands, by creating a new channel for the Don River south from the Keating Channel then turning west to run between Commissioners Street and the Ship Channel into Toronto Harbour. The island is to be redeveloped from industrial to mixed commercial and residential use. Streetcar service for the island is planned on reserved right-of-ways which may initially be used by buses. The streetcar right-of-way would be on the east side of a relocated Cherry Street.

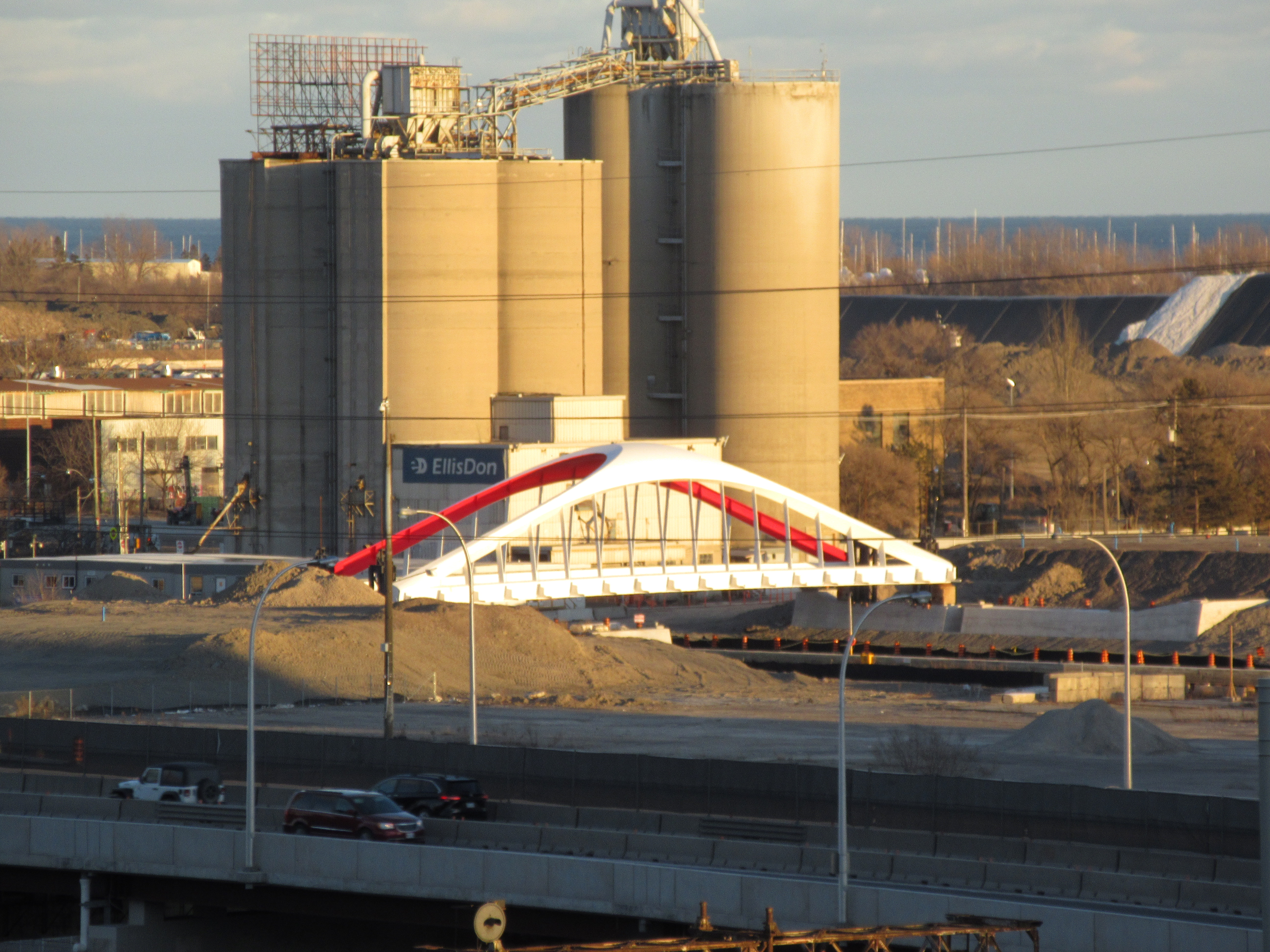
Bridge to Ookwemin Minising, designed to carry streetcars on a relocated Cherry Street

As of April 2023, the plan was to implement the new line in two stages. The first stage would be to build the line along Cherry Street and Queens Quay East and connect the tracks to those on Queens Quay West at Bay Street. Streetcars would run from the Port Lands to possibly Exhibition Loop. The streetcar tunnel under Bay Street would then be closed to enlarge the Union Station loop and Queens Quay station. When the tunnel reopens, streetcars would run from Union Station to the Port Lands.

Besides building the streetcar line along Queens Quay East, the city ultimately wants to connect Ookwemin Minising precinct to the 504 King streetcar route via its Cherry Street branch. As a first phase, the city feels it could either build along Queens Quay or connect to the 504 King, but not both simultaneously. Thus, the city prefers to build the Queens Quay trackage first before making the 504 King connection.

== Cost ==
In 2015, the estimated cost to build the East Bayfront LRT from Union Station to Small Street was $520 million. The breakdown was as follows:

- Building a new eastbound passenger platform at Union Station: $112 million
- Extension of Bay Street tunnel to Freeland Street: $156 million
- Surface infrastructure: $66 million
- Rolling stock: $36 million
- Queens Quay revitalization: $150 million

By June 2019, the estimated cost of the line had grown to $700 million. The above costs do not reflect design changes to Queens Quay station or the planned extension of the line from Parliament Street to Ookwemin Minising, changes which were proposed in 2021.

By October 2023, the cost had risen to $2.57 billion broken down as: $932 million for Union Station Loop, $1.3 billion to connect Union Station to Ookwemin Minising, and $337 million to connect lower Cherry Street to Distillery Loop in a separate phase. By 2024, the project cost was estimated at $2.67 billion.

By March 2026, the estimated cost rose to $3 billion.

== Challenges ==
The underground streetcar loop at Union Station does not have the capacity to accommodate the extra light rail vehicles needed to service the new line. Thus, a new eastbound platform must be added.

A sewer at Queens Quay and Bay Street will make it difficult to build an eastern portal to bring the tracks to the surface.

One of the issues which has delayed progress of constructing the line is the proposed redevelopment of the waterfront properties between Jarvis Street and Parliament Street, which lie south of Queens Quay. The plans called for two access streets, which would cross the proposed light rail line at signalized intersections. However, the developer has designed a third street into the plan, likely due to the expected traffic volumes from the development, which would require an additional signalized intersection with the light rail line. Some councillors have stated this would negatively affect service along the proposed route, possibly adding as much as an extra three minutes travel to a line that would only require ten minutes to traverse.

== Demand ==
George Brown College's campus in the East Bayfront has opened and there are development plans for several apartment and condominium complexes on Queens Quay East and, in future years, in the West Don Lands. Thus, there will be roughly 20,000 residential units in the area, plus 8,000 jobs and 3,500 students.

According to transit advocate Steve Munro, developers in the area, particularly for commercial properties, are concerned that without good transit, a better connection to the core area than the Sherbourne and Bay buses, developments are not marketable.

A project called the Waterfront Transit Reset was set up to study possible streetcar system upgrades along the waterfront from Long Branch to Leslie Street. That study included the East Bayfront. A WTR report dated November 13, 2017, stated that:

While three bus routes currently serve the area, adding higher-quality, higher-capacity streetcar service is an urgent priority for the TTC, the City, and Waterfront Toronto. Projected peak demand in 2041 on this section is approximately 2400 people per hour, and serving this very high level of demand requires high-quality streetcar service in a dedicated right of way.

In January 2019, the Waterfront BIA (a neighbourhood business group) estimates a $1.2 billion loss of productivity and a $20 billion loss of federal, provincial and local tax revenue if the opening of the East Bayfront LRT were delayed from 2025 to 2045. The BIA hopes that the line will open by 2025 which according to the BIA would stimulate commercial and residential development providing 135,000 new jobs and housing 67,000 residents along the proposed line.

In 2026, the line was predicted to serve 150,000 people and support the construction of 75,000 housing units. After the full development of Quayside and the Port Lands, the line was predicted to serve about 50,000 riders per day.

== Alternatives to streetcar operation ==
The City of Toronto considered a bus service running in the former streetcar's dedicated right-of-way. The challenge for such a service to the eastern waterfront is the connection at Union Station for transferring passengers. There is limited sidewalk space for both pedestrians and transit stops along Bay Street. Buses would have to compete with other traffic through the Bay Street underpass and mixed traffic south to Queens Quay.

The City also considered replacing the streetcar track in the 400-metre (1,300 ft) tunnel under Bay Street between Union Station and Queen's Quay with a driverless people-mover system; this option also included changing the streetcar routing so it only ran along Queen's Quay.

In April 2019, staff recommended continuing streetcar operation under Bay Street to Union Station, along with extending platforms and adding extra tracks along the Union Station streetcar loop.

In June 2025, the TTC created dedicated bus lanes along Queens Quay East. However, city planners said such lanes would become inadequate to accommodate future riders as more housing is built along the route. Also according to planners, the line would be too close to the water for a subway. Thus, a streetcar line became the preferred choice.

== History ==
On April 5, 2006, the first Public Forum for the Environmental Assessment for the Eastern Waterfront transit proposals was held.

In February 2012, Emily Jackson of the Toronto Star reported that budget over-runs on the Queens Quay West line had not left enough funds to start the Queens Quay East line.

On August 29, 2014, The Globe and Mail reported that senior City of Toronto officials had gone over the head of City Council, and made an appeal for funding for the line right to more senior levels of government. TTC General Manager Andy Byford and City Manager Joe Pennachetti had made their proposal to their opposite numbers in the Provincial bureaucracy. According to The Globe and Mail, they had not yet approached provincial and federal politicians.

In September 2015, the TTC Budget Committee passed the following motion regarding the Capital Budget:

Request TTC staff, working with the City of Toronto manager, and Waterfront Toronto, to prioritize the East Bayfront LRT project, and to report back to the TTC's Budget Committee on how to expedite the work, starting with the planning and engineering work.

In May 2016, condominium developers expressed concern about a lack of activity on the East Bayfront LRT project. Sam Crignano, president of Cityzen, a developer with three projects along the eastern waterfront, said that having two or three bus lines in the area won't be enough to handle the future influx of new residents and employees. Niall Haggart, executive vice-president of the Daniels Corp., urged action on the LRT project. Daniels has started a $700-million mixed-use development which will add about 7,300 people to the area by day and 2,500 at night. The Toronto Star reported that the project had been stalled because of a lack of funding and piecemeal transportation planning.

A report about the Waterfront Transit Reset project dated November 13, 2017, stated that: "The City, Waterfront Toronto, and the TTC would carry out the approved plans for a new streetcar line along Queens Quay East [to Parliament Street] in the East Bayfront area."

Since the provincial election of June 2018, when there was a change in government, the province has made no promise to fund the Easy Bayfront LRT. In January 2019, the provincial Ministry of Transportation said it had not received a formal request for funding from the City; thus, the province remains uncommitted.

In June 2019, Sidewalk Labs offered $100 million in "credit support" to build a portion of the East Bayfront LRT between Cherry Street and Broadview Avenue, which would pass through its proposed development in Toronto's Portland area. The estimated cost of that portion of the line was $406 million and would be in addition to the $700 million estimated cost to build the line from Union Station to Small Street.

On June 17, 2020, the TTC Board approved spending $15,000,000 over three years on design work for the expansion of streetcar platforms at Union and Queens Quay stations as well for a new tunnel and portal for the East Bayfront line. The TTC was also considering connecting the line to Distillery Loop.

At a virtual public meeting held on June 21, 2021, it was announced that in phase 1, the LRT line would terminate in the Port Lands at a new Polson Loop near Cherry and Polson Streets. A new loop at Parliament Street was rejected as a terminus because of crowding by existing buildings. Distillery Loop was problematic because of construction of the Ontario Line and because grading problems would require a temporary loop elsewhere. A Polson Loop would also support development in the Port Lands, while a Parliament Loop or Distillery Loop would not.

In January 2023, Waterfront Toronto announced design changes so that a new on-street loop on Ookwemin Minising would be the eastern terminal of the line instead of Polson Loop. The streetcar line would be extended a short distance on Commissioners Street and then loop on a dedicated right-of-way via New Munitions Street, Centre Street and Villiers Park Street – all new streets to be constructed. A loop would help serve the planned mixed-use community and future parks to be built on the island. A new Polson Loop would remain in plans for future expansion.

An October 2023 city report recommended that a streetcar connection along Cherry Street between Lakeshore Boulevard East and Distillery Loop be delivered as a separate contract in a later phase because constructing such a link may conflict with Ontario Line construction and the planned Gardiner Expressway realignment.

In May 2024, the TTC introduced the 114 Queens Quay East bus which would roughly follow the route of the proposed LRT. By January 2025, the TTC proposed setting up interim bus priority lanes along Queens Quay East between Bay and Parliament streets as a forerunner to the LRT. The TTC expected to reduce 114 run time by 5 minutes (a 30 percent reduction). These lanes went into service on June 6, 2025.

By the end of March 2026, the federal, provincial and municipal governments each agreed to contribute $1 billion for the LRT project. The line was predicted to cost $3 billion, an increase from the $2.57 billion estimate in 2023.

== Future expansion ==
In a later phase, there could be a branch running east from Cherry Street along Commissioners Street that, halfway to Leslie Street, would turn north to the planned East Harbour Transit Hub, with connections to GO Transit trains, the planned Ontario Line and a possible southerly extension of the streetcar line along Broadview Avenue. A November 2017 report about the Waterfront Transit Reset project stated that projected demand east to Leslie Street (150 people per hour in 2041) was too low to justify streetcar service further east.

== See also ==
- Waterfront West LRT
- Toronto streetcar system
