= List of National Historic Sites of Canada in Toronto =

Designated national historic site in Toronto

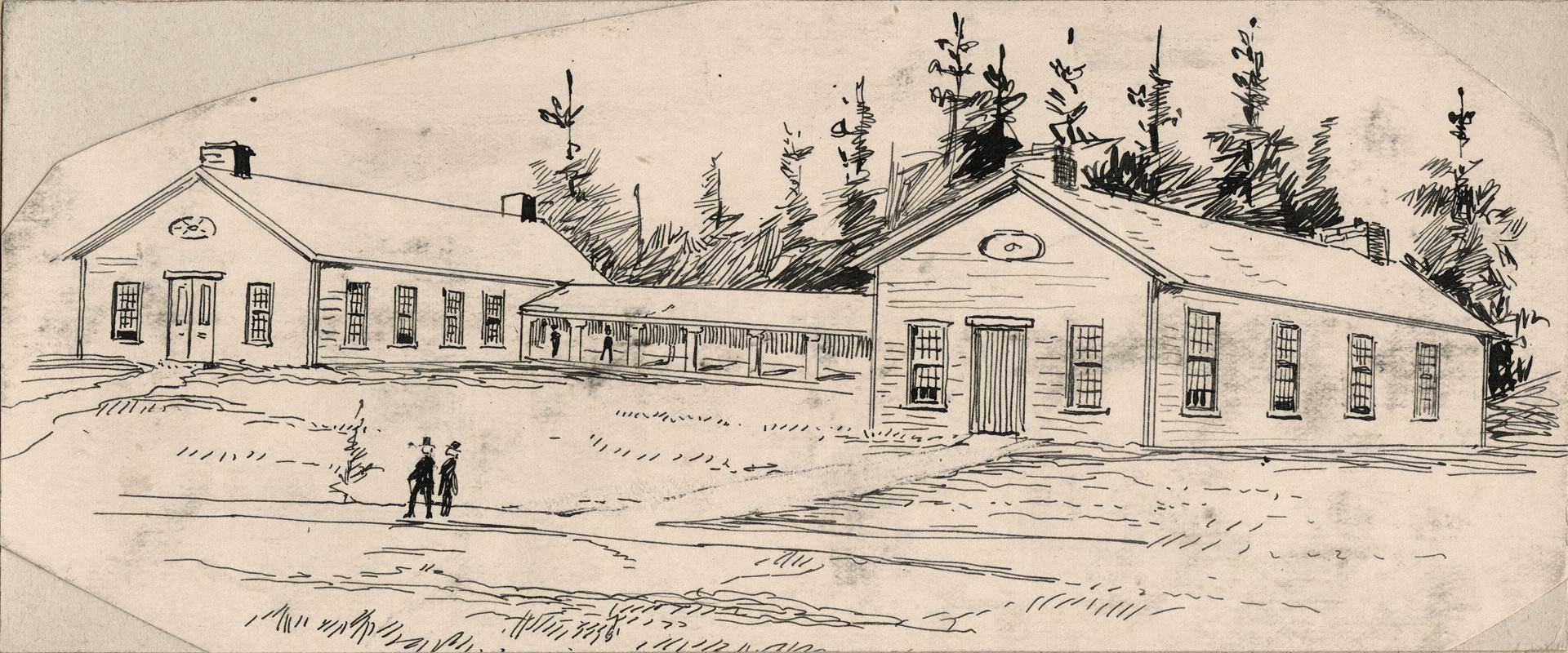
- The first Parliament buildings

History of Toronto
- Events: Toronto Purchase; Founding of York; Battle of York; Battle of Montgomery's Tavern; Incorporation of Toronto
- Buildings: National Historic Sites; Lost buildings; Oldest buildings; Great Fire 1949; Great Fire 1904

This is a list of National Historic Sites in Toronto, Ontario, Canada. There are 37 National Historic Sites (French: Lieux historiques nationaux) in Toronto, the first of which was Fort York, designated in 1923.

Numerous National Historic Events also occurred in Toronto, and are identified at places associated with them, using the same style of federal plaque which marks National Historic Sites. Several National Historic Persons are commemorated throughout the city in the same way. The markers do not indicate which designation—a Site, Event, or Person—a subject has been given.

National Historic Sites located elsewhere in Ontario are listed at National Historic Sites in Ontario, with additional breakout lists for some cities. Certain sites are part of the national park system, administered by Parks Canada. Bead Hill National Historic Site, in eastern Scarborough, became the only National Historic Site in Toronto in the national park system on June 15, 2019, located within Rouge National Urban Park.

This list uses names designated by the national Historic Sites and Monuments Board, which may differ from other names for these sites.

National Historic Sites
Site	Date(s)	Designated	Location	Description	Image
Annesley Hall	1903 (completed)	1990	Toronto	The first purpose-built women's residence on a Canadian university campus, and a good example of the Queen Anne Revival style in institutional architecture	Exterior view of Annesley Hall
Balmoral Fire Hall	1911 (completed)	1990	Toronto	A rare example of the Queen Anne Revival style used for a fire hall	Exterior view of Bamoral Fire Hall
Bank of Upper Canada Building	1825 (completed)	1977	Toronto	An early 19th-century bank building, representative of the rise of Toronto as a commercial centre and the role played by the Bank of Upper Canada in the development of Upper Canada	Exterior view of the Bank of Upper Canada Building
Bead Hill	1600s (village established)	1991 (designated); June 15, 2019 (added to national park system)	Toronto	An archaeological site in Rouge National Urban Park with the only known intact remains of a 17th-century Seneca village in the country	alt+1873 hand drawn map showing the location of the village north of Lake Ontario
Birkbeck Building	1908 (completed)	1986	Toronto	A four-storey office building typical of the premises of many financial institutions prevalent in central business districts of Canadian cities before the First World War; representative of a transitional building from that period which combined historical styles with (then) modern design and construction techniques	Exterior view of the Birkbeck Building
Eaton's 7th Floor Auditorium and Round Room	1930 (completed)	1983	Toronto	A foyer, restaurant and auditorium, designed by French architect Jacques Carlu and muralist Natacha Carlu, located within the former Eaton's College Street department store; remarkable examples of Art Deco and Streamline Moderne interior design	Interior view of the Carlu
Chapel of St. James-the-Less Anglican Church	1861 (completed)	1990	Toronto	The chapel is a noted example of High Victorian Gothic Revival architecture and exemplifies the small chapels built in this style in Canada	Exterior view of the Chapel of St. James-the-Less Anglican Church
Eglinton Theatre	1936 (completed)	1993	Toronto	A cinema representing one of the best examples of the Art Deco-style in Canadian theatre design	Exterior view of the Eglinton Theatre
Elgin and Winter Garden Theatres	1914 (completed)	1982	Toronto	A pair of stacked theatres built by renowned theatre-designer Thomas W. Lamb; originally built for vaudeville, they are the last remaining operational double-decker theatres in the world	Exterior view of the ticket booth at the Elgin and Winter Garden Theatres
Fort York	1793 (established), 1815 (current fort completed)	1923	Toronto	The birthplace of the settlement that would become Toronto and the primary defence for (what was then) York, Upper Canada, the Fort now serves as a museum containing the largest collection of War of 1812 buildings in Canada and many of the oldest buildings in Toronto	Aerial view of Fort York
Fourth York Post Office	1835 (completed)	1980	Toronto	Also known as the "First Toronto Post Office" (it was the fourth post office in York, but the first one to serve the settlement when it became Toronto in 1834), it is one of the earliest surviving examples in Canada of a building purpose-built as a post office; typical of small, early 19th-century public buildings, combining public offices and a private residence	Exterior photo of the front of the First Toronto Post Office
George Brown House	1877 (completed)	1976	Toronto	The residence of George Brown, founder of (what is now) The Globe and Mail and a Father of Confederation; the site in Toronto most associated with the abolitionist movement and the Underground Railroad	Side exterior of George Brown House
Gooderham and Worts Distillery	1859 to 1927 (construction of extant distillery buildings)	1988	Toronto	Forty historic distillery buildings on a 13-acre site, representative of the history of the Canadian distilling industry and Toronto's industrial past	View of the Stonehouse Distillery at night
Gouinlock Buildings / Early Exhibition Buildings	1904 to 1912 (completed)	1988	Toronto	Five buildings (the Fire Hall/Police Station, Government Building, Horticulture Building, Music Building and Press Building) on the grounds of the Canadian National Exhibition; the largest and finest group of early 20th century exhibition buildings in Canada	View of the Press Building
Heliconian Hall	1876 (completed)	2008	Toronto	Originally constructed as a church in Yorkville in the Carpenter Gothic style, the building has since 1923 served as a unique multidisciplinary arts club specifically for women	View of the front facade of Heliconian Hall
John Street Roundhouse (Canadian Pacific)	1931 (completed)	1990	Toronto	Located in Toronto's formerly vast railway lands near Union Station, it is Canada's best surviving example of a roundhouse; now occupied by the Toronto Railway Heritage Centre, the Steam Whistle brewery and a furniture store	View of the John Street Roundhouse
Kensington Market	1815 (first development (Bellevue Estate))	2006	Toronto	A neighbourhood noted for its network of narrow streets and lanes fronted by rows of small houses and shops; since the early 20th century, it has been home to numerous successive waves of immigrant communities, making it a microcosm of Canada's multiculturalism	View of Kensington Market from Baldwin and Kensington Avenues
Maple Leaf Gardens	1931 (completed)	2007	Toronto	Built for the Toronto Maple Leafs, the arena is regarded as of the most renowned "shrines" in the history of ice hockey; for 70 years, it was one of Canada's foremost venues for large-scale sporting events, concerts and political events	Maple Leaf Gardens at the corner of Church and Carlton.
Massey Hall	1894 (completed)	1981	Toronto	A gift to the City of Toronto from wealthy industrialist Hart Massey, the concert hall has been one of the country's most important cultural institutions and is renowned for its outstanding acoustics	Exterior view of main entrance and neon signage of Massey Hall at night
Metallic Roofing Company Offices	1897 (completed)	1984	Toronto	A unique Beaux-Arts style building decorated entirely in pressed metal; the building was dismantled in 1982 when the site was redeveloped, and it is held by the Ontario Heritage Trust for eventual reconstruction	Metallic Roofing Company Offices surrounded by hoarding, prior to the demolition of the building.
Montgomery's Tavern	1837 (battle)	1925	Toronto	The site of an abortive insurrection by William Lyon MacKenzie during the Upper Canada Rebellion; the rebellion ultimately contributed to the establishment of responsible government in the colony	Sketch of the Battle of Montgomery's Tavern
Mount Pleasant Cemetery	1876 (opened)	2000	Toronto	An outstanding example of picturesque design inspired by the 19th-century tradition of rural cemeteries in a naturalistic setting; many of the grave markers are representative of significant epochs in the history of Toronto and the rest of the country	Exterior of the Mount Pleasant Cemetery mausoleum and crematorium
Old Toronto City Hall and York County Court House	1899 (completed)	1984	Toronto	One of Canada's finest examples of Richardsonian Romanesque architecture and a symbol of Toronto's prosperity and rapid urbanization in the late 19th century	Exterior view of the Old City Hall clock tower
Old Toronto Post Office / Old Bank of Canada	1853 (completed)	1958	Toronto	A noted example of Greek Revival architecture in Canada	Exterior view of the Toronto Street Post Office
Osgoode Hall	1832 (original wing completed)	1979	Toronto	Housing the Law Society of Upper Canada, courts of law and, until 1959, the only law school in the province, Osgoode Hall symbolizes the legal profession and court system in Ontario; a landmark on Queen Street West, it is also known for its ornate interiors	Interior view of the Great Library in Osgoode Hall
Royal Alexandra Theatre	1907 (completed)	1985	Toronto	One of the last theatres of its type built in Canada and arguably the best surviving example, it is a nationally significant theatre that has played a central role in the social and cultural life of Toronto	Exterior view of the Royal Alexandra Theatre
Royal Conservatory of Music	1881 (Ihnatowycz Hall completed)	1995	Toronto	Originally constructed as the first home of McMaster University, Ihnatowycz Hall has housed the Royal Conservatory of Music since 1962; some of Canada's some of the most prominent musicians and music teachers have studied at the Conservatory, and it has played a significant role in music education across the country	Exterior view of the Royal Conservatory of Music
St. Anne's Anglican Church	1908 (completed)	1996	Toronto	The church contains a unique cycle of paintings, executed in 1923, by ten noted artists, including three members of the Group of Seven, under the supervision of J. E. H. MacDonald	Exterior view of St. Anne's Anglican Church
St. George's Hall (Arts and Letters Club)	1891 (completed)	2007	Toronto	Since 1920, St. George's Hall has been a gathering place for painters, writers, musicians, architects, actors and patrons of the arts; an important venue and catalyst for artistic activity in Canada	Exterior view of St. George's Hall
St. Lawrence Hall	1850 (completed)	1967	Toronto	St. Lawrence Hall was for many years Toronto's chief social and cultural centre, and is among the finest 19th century public buildings in Canada	Exterior view of St. Lawrence Hall
The Grange	1817 (completed)	1970	Toronto	An historic Georgian manor in downtown Toronto, it is one of the few surviving residential estates belonging to prominent citizens from the settlement of York; the oldest remaining brick house in Toronto	Exterior view of the Grange
Spadina	1866 (built)	July 31, 2019	Toronto	A country estate transformed into an opulent Edwardian residence	
The Studio Building	1914 (completed)	2005	Toronto	An early Canadian artists’ studio in the modernist style, with associations with important Canadian artists including the Group of Seven; designed by architect Eden Smith for painter Lawren Harris, it contains six purpose-built studio spaces and, at one time, artists such as Tom Thomson, Arthur Lismer and Thoreau MacDonald lived and worked on site	Exterior view of the Studio Building
Toronto Island Airport Terminal Building	1939 (completed)	1989	Toronto	Among the first group of airport terminals to be funded and approved by the then new Department of Transport as part of the development of Trans-Canada Air Lines; one of very few early terminal buildings to have survived and likely the oldest operating terminal of its kind in the country	Exterior view of the original Toronto Island Airport Terminal Building
Union Station (Canadian Pacific and Grand Trunk)	1927 (completed)	1975	Toronto	The finest example in Canada of classical Beaux-Arts railway stations, and the largest of the great urban stations built in the country during the early 20th century; illustrative of an era when railways were expanding and Toronto was becoming a modern metropolis	View of the facade of Toronto's Union Station
University College	1859 (completed)	1968	Toronto	One of the oldest collegiate buildings in the country, associated both with the development of non-denominational, publicly supported institutions of higher education in Canada, and with the development of the University of Toronto	Exterior view of University College
Women's College Hospital	1883 (founded)	1995	Toronto	Founded at a time when women's access to medical education and hospital practice was extremely restricted, the hospital uniquely emphasizes women's health issues and women as health care providers; symbolic of the struggle and contribution of Canadian women to the medical profession	Exterior view of Women's College Hospital

== See also ==
- History of Toronto
