= List of historic places in Toronto =

Toronto, Ontario, Canada, has several federal, provincial, or municipal historic places entered on the Canadian Register of Historic Places.

== List of historic places ==
Name	Address	Coordinates	Government recognition (CRHP №)	Wikidata ID	Image
1929 clubhouse of the Toronto Hunt Club	1107 Avenue Road; Toronto ON	43°44′34″N 79°24′47″W	Federal (11502)		More images
47 Front Street East	47 Front Street East; Toronto ON	43°38′53″N 79°22′28″W	Ontario (8837)		More images
49 Front Street East (Dixon Building)	49 Front Street East; Toronto ON	43°38′54″N 79°22′28″W	Ontario (8838), Toronto municipality (1451)		More images
Annesley Hall at the University of Toronto	95 Queen's Park Crescent; Toronto ON	43°40′04″N 79°23′35″W	Federal (1155)	Q4769020	More images
Armour Heights College	215 Yonge Boulevard; Toronto ON	43°44′30″N 79°24′53″W	Federal (7518)		Upload Photo
Jesse Ashbridge House	1444 Queen Street; Toronto ON	43°39′56″N 79°19′18″W	Ontario (8869)		More images
Balmoral Fire Hall	Balmoral Avenue; Toronto ON	43°41′08″N 79°23′41″W	Federal (7371)		More images
Bank of Toronto	205 Yonge Street; Toronto ON	43°39′13″N 79°22′47″W	Ontario (8843), Toronto municipality (19828)		More images
Bank of Upper Canada Building	252 Adelaide Street East; Toronto ON	43°39′06″N 79°22′15″W	Federal (1776)		More images
Bead Hill National Historic Site of Canada	Hill west of the confluence of Rouge River and Little Rouge Creek; Toronto (Scarborough) ON	43°48′20″N 79°08′10″W	Federal (16783)		Upload Photo
Birkbeck Building	8-10 Adelaide Street East; Toronto ON	43°39′03″N 79°22′40″W	Federal (7555), Ontario (19809)		More images
Chapel of St. James-the-Less	635 Parliament Street; Toronto ON	43°40′11″N 79°22′10″W	Federal (7487)		More images
Dominion Public Building	1 Front Street West; Toronto ON	43°38′46″N 79°22′41″W	Federal (18075)		More images
Don Brewery	27-39 Old Brewery Lane	43°39′28″N 79°21′25″W	Toronto municipality (1321)	Q17104966	More images
Don Valley Brick Works	550 Bayview Avenue; Toronto ON	43°41′11″N 79°21′46″W	Ontario (15361)		More images
Eaton's 7th Floor Auditorium and Round Room	2 College Street; Toronto ON	43°39′41″N 79°23′01″W	Federal (7413)		More images
Eglinton Theatre	400 Eglinton Avenue West; Toronto ON	43°42′15″N 79°24′38″W	Federal (12689)		More images
Elgin and Winter Garden Theatres	189 Yonge Street; Toronto ON	43°39′11″N 79°22′45″W	Federal (11960), Ontario (9622)		More images
Enoch Turner Schoolhouse	106 Trinity Street; Toronto ON	43°39′11″N 79°21′41″W	Ontario (19803)		More images
Fourth York Post Office	260 Adelaide Street East; Toronto ON	43°39′06″N 79°22′13″W	Federal (12726)		More images
Fort York Heritage Conservation District	100 Garrison Road; Toronto ON	43°38′21″N 79°24′10″W	Toronto municipality (3567)		
Fort York Armoury	700 Fleet Street; Toronto ON	43°38′13″N 79°24′29″W	Federal (9693)		More images
Fort York	100 Garrison Road; Toronto ON	43°38′18″N 79°24′21″W	Federal (3677)		More images
George Brown House	186 Beverley Street; Toronto ON	43°39′21″N 79°23′41″W	Federal (9182), Ontario (8868)		More images
Gooderham and Worts Distillery	Trinity Street; Toronto ON	43°39′01″N 79°21′33″W	Federal (1195)		More images
Gooderham Building	49 Wellington Street East; Toronto ON	43°38′54″N 79°22′28″W	Ontario (8311)		More images
Gouinlock Buildings / Early Exhibition Buildings National Historic Site of Canada	Toronto ON	43°37′43″N 79°24′42″W	Federal (10470)		More images
Heliconian Hall	35 Hazelton Avenue; Toronto ON	43°40′18″N 79°23′36″W	Federal (13819)		More images
John Street Roundhouse	255 Bremner Boulevard; Toronto ON	43°38′28″N 79°23′10″W	Federal (12781)		More images
Joseph Sheppard Building	4900 Yonge Street; Toronto ON	43°45′47″N 79°24′47″W	Federal (10230)		More images
Kensington Market	Dundas West, Bellevue, Spadina, College Streets; Toronto ON	43°39′15″N 79°24′04″W	Federal (14463)		More images
Maple Leaf Gardens	60 Carleton Street; Toronto ON	43°39′44″N 79°22′49″W	Federal (13397)		More images
Mary Perram House	4 Wellesley Place; Toronto ON	43°40′02″N 79°22′37″W	Toronto municipality (1439)		More images
Masaryk Hall	220 Cowan Avenue; Toronto ON	43°38′28″N 79°25′58″W	Ontario (10512)		More images
Massey Hall	178 Victoria Street; Toronto ON	43°39′15″N 79°22′45″W	Federal (9369)		More images
Montgomery's Tavern	2384 Yonge Street; Toronto ON	43°42′34″N 79°23′57″W	Federal (14414)		
Mount Pleasant Cemetery	375 Mount Pleasant Road; Toronto ON	43°41′46″N 79°23′03″W	Federal (9514)		More images
Newman Centre	89 St.George Street; Toronto ON	43°39′51″N 79°23′54″W	Ontario (10539)		More images
Old Toronto City Hall and York County Court House	60 Queen Street West; Toronto ON	43°39′09″N 79°22′55″W	Federal (4255)		More images
Osgoode Hall	130 Queen Street West; Toronto ON	43°39′07″N 79°23′08″W	Federal (4258)		More images
St. Anne's Anglican Church	270 Gladstone Avenue; Toronto ON	43°39′02″N 79°25′51″W	Federal (12681), Ontario (8901)		More images
Postal Station "D"	328 Keele Street; Toronto ON	43°39′50″N 79°27′50″W	Federal (4686)		More images
Royal Alexandra Theatre	260 King Street West; Toronto ON	43°38′50″N 79°23′15″W	Federal (1137)		More images
Rupert Simpson House and Stable	2 Wellesley Place; Toronto ON		Toronto municipality (1291)		More images
St. George's Hall (Arts and Letters Club)	14 Elm Street; Toronto ON	43°39′28″N 79°22′57″W	Federal (12139)		More images
St. Lawrence Hall	157 King Street East; Toronto ON	43°39′00″N 79°22′20″W	Federal (7527)		More images
The Studio Building	25 Severn Street; Toronto ON	43°40′24″N 79°23′10″W	Federal (9521)		More images
The Grange	317 Dundas Street West; Toronto ON	43°39′14″N 79°23′37″W	Federal (7529)		More images
The Royal Conservatory of Music	273 Bloor Street West; Toronto ON	43°40′05″N 79°23′46″W	Federal (12044)		More images
Toronto Island Airport Terminal Building	Toronto ON	43°37′58″N 79°23′43″W	Federal (7530)		More images
Toronto Street Post Office / Bank of Canada Building	10 Toronto Street; Toronto ON	43°38′59″N 79°22′34″W	Federal (9933)		More images
Union Station (Canadian Pacific Railway and Grand Trunk Railway)	65-71 Front Street West; Toronto ON	43°38′44″N 79°22′51″W	Federal (6299, (6492)		More images
University College, Toronto	15 King's College Circle, St. George campus of the University of Toronto; Toronto ON	43°39′45″N 79°23′43″W	Federal (9520)		More images
Wesley Building	299 Queen Street West; Toronto ON	43°38′52″N 79°23′28″W	Toronto municipality (4921)		More images
Winchester Hotel and Winchester Hall	531 Parliament St; Toronto ON	43°39′56″N 79°22′06″W	Toronto municipality (3631)		More images
Women's College Hospital	Grenville Street; Toronto ON	43°39′42″N 79°23′15″W	Federal (7738)		More images

== See also ==
- List of historic places in Ontario
