= Old Town, Toronto =

Neighbourhood in Toronto, Ontario, Canada

Old Town
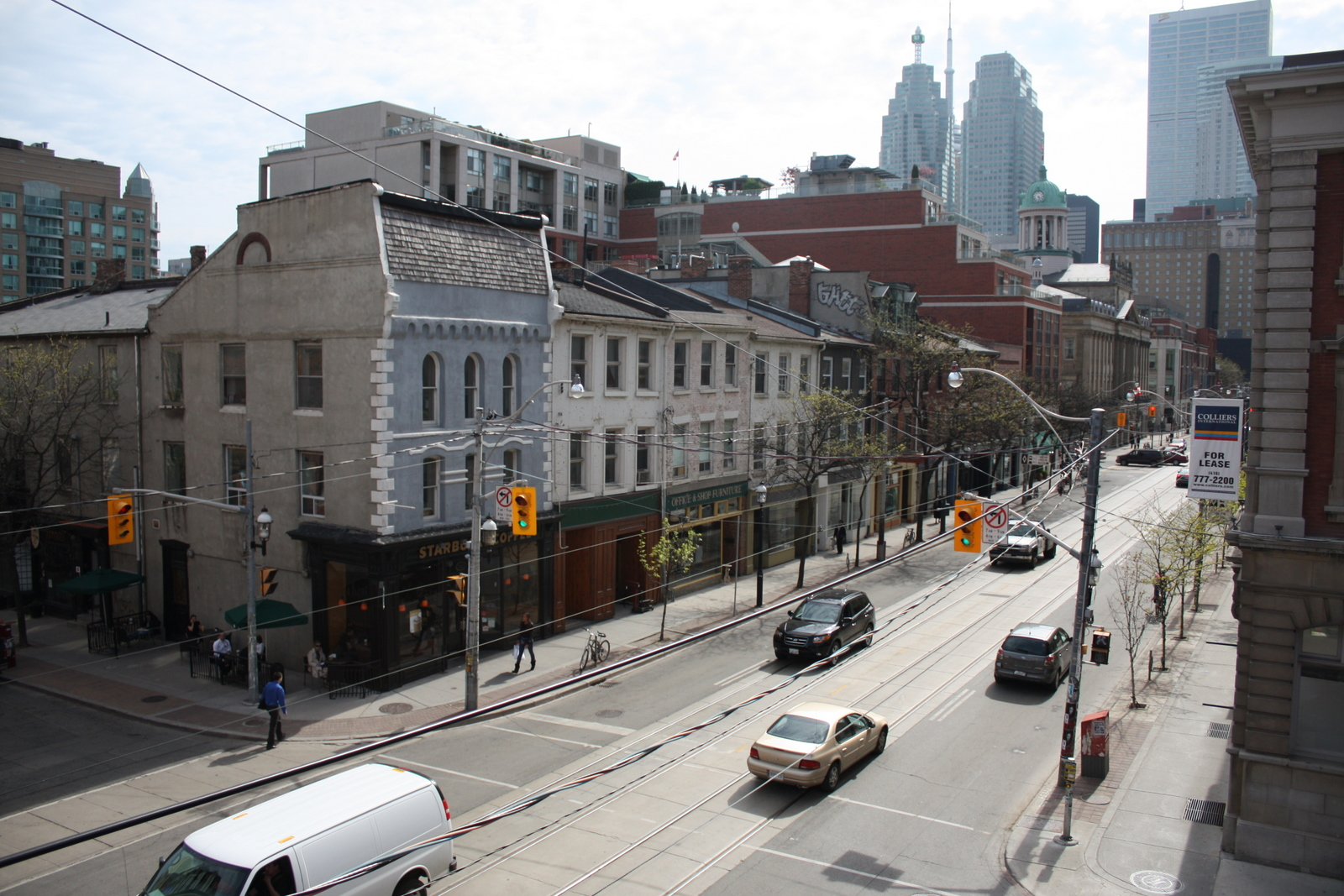
- View of Old Town from the northeast of George Street and King Street East

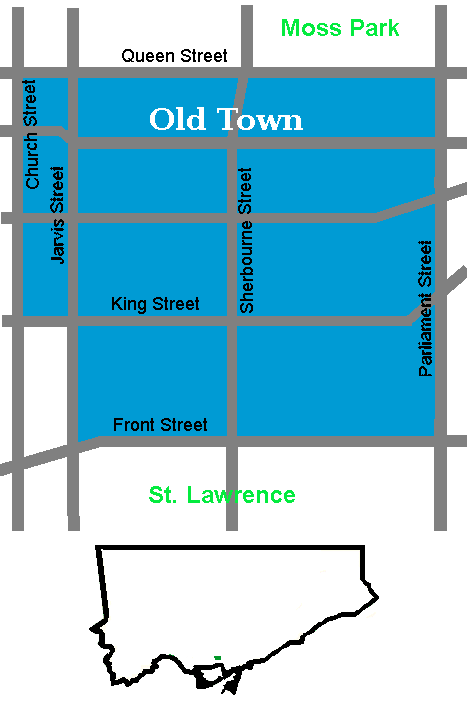
- Detail and location of Old Town within Toronto
- Coordinates: 43.651352°N 79.367912°W
- Country: Canada
- Province: Ontario
- City: Toronto

Old Town is a neighbourhood and retail district in downtown Toronto, Ontario, Canada. It was the first of Toronto's named neighbourhoods, having acquired the moniker no later than 1815, at which time the original town of York was expanding. The old neighbourhood was referred to as "Old Town" by residents, and the new neighbourhood as "New Town". The site still has many buildings dating back to the nineteenth century.

The neighbourhood's approximate boundaries are Queen Street on the north from Church Street east to Parliament Street, Parliament Street south to Front Street, Front Street west to Jarvis Street, one block north to King Street and Church Street north to Queen Street.

== History ==
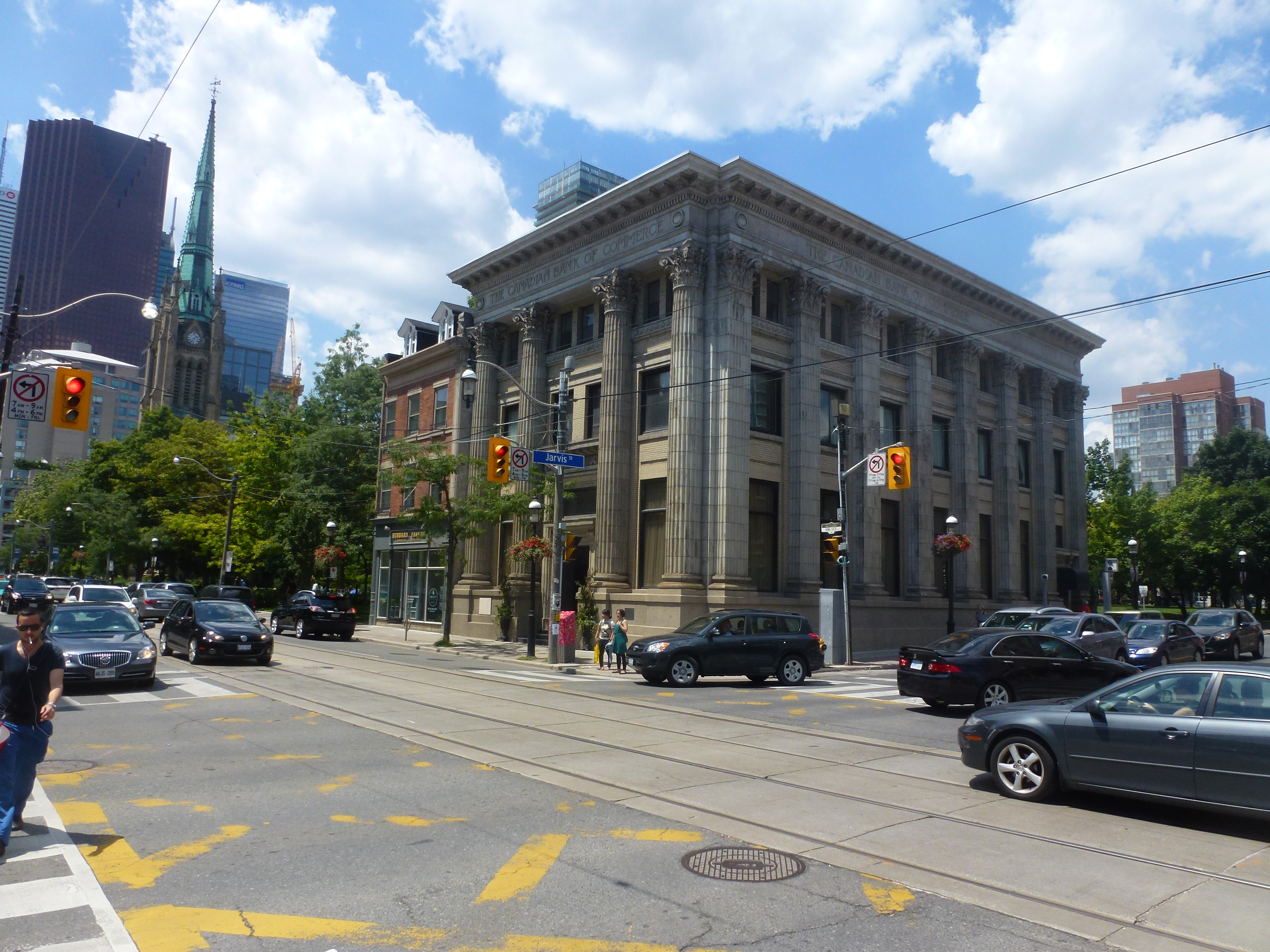
View of King Street East looking west from Jarvis Street in 1845 (left) and 2014 (right). The Cathedral Church of St. James is visible in the background of both images.

The first town plan for York was laid out by Captain Mann in 1788. However, the original plan was rejected by Lieutenant-Governor Simcoe who had a new plan drawn up by Alexander Aitkin. The plan called for a compact, ten-block townsite, laid out in a gridiron pattern near the mouth of the Don River. This ten-block plan was bounded by George, Berkeley, Adelaide and Front Streets, with the areas east of Parliament Street to the Don, and west of Peter Street to the Humber set aside for government and military purposes. Government buildings were erected near Parliament and Front Streets.

Shortly after the British-Native force was defeated at the Battle of York on 27 April 1813, American forces occupied the settlement. In the initial days of the occupation, a number of properties in Old Town were looted and burned; including the Parliament building of Upper Canada, situated south of Old Town, on the southwest corner of Front and Parliament Street. The occupation ended on May 8, when the American force departed from York.

The Parliament buildings were rebuilt in the same location after the war, in 1820. The building was destroyed in a fire in 1824. The third Parliament of Upper Canada was completed west of Old Town on Front Street in 1832.

In April 1849, the area was ravaged by the Great Fire of Toronto, destroying buildings on the north side of King Street East, between Nelson Street and Church Street. The Cathedral Church of St. James was among the buildings destroyed in the fire, although it was later rebuilt in 1850.

== Character ==
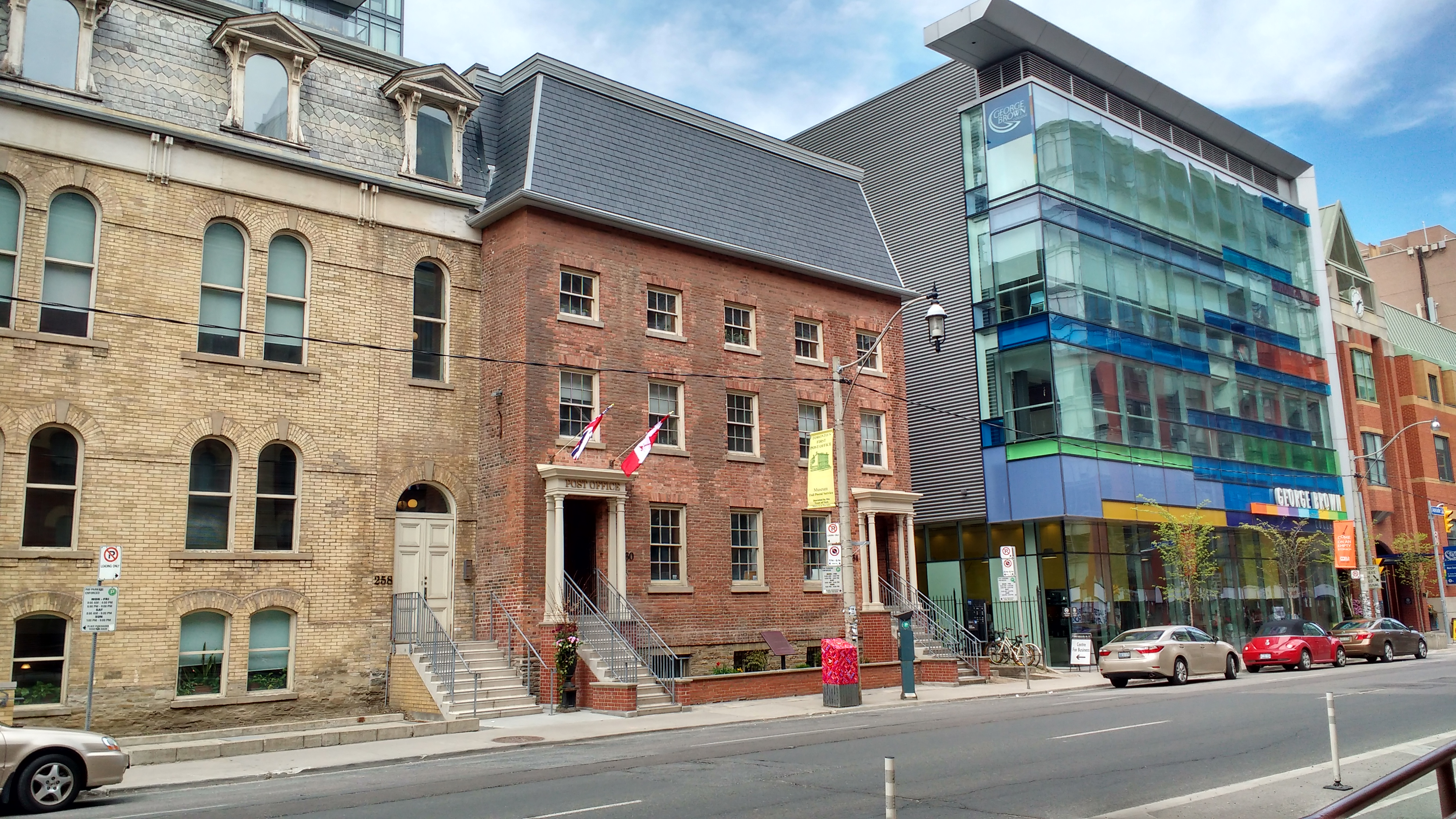
Opened in 1833, the First Toronto Post Office (centre) is a museum and a full-service Canada Post office. It is located next to George Brown College.

The area is filled with buildings predominantly two or three storeys tall. Along the main streets of Front, King Street East and Queen Street East are numerous first floor restaurants and stores with walk-up apartments on the upper floors. The area also has numerous older warehouses that have been converted to lofts or offices.

The area between Front Street on the south and Adelaide Street on the north, between Berkeley Street on the east and George Street on the west, is the ten blocks that make up the original town-site of York, as laid out in 1793. While no buildings in Old Town originated from the late 1790s, the neighbourhood does hold numerous heritage buildings that dates back to the 19th century. Additionally, several newer developments have been built in the neighbourhood, such as the Globe and Mail Centre, a 17-storey office complex completed in 2016.

=== Landmarks ===
- Alumnae Theatre
- Bank of Upper Canada Building
- St. James Anglican Cathedral
- Daniel Brooke Building
- First Toronto Post Office (or the Fourth York Post Office)
- Paul Bishop Houses

== Education ==
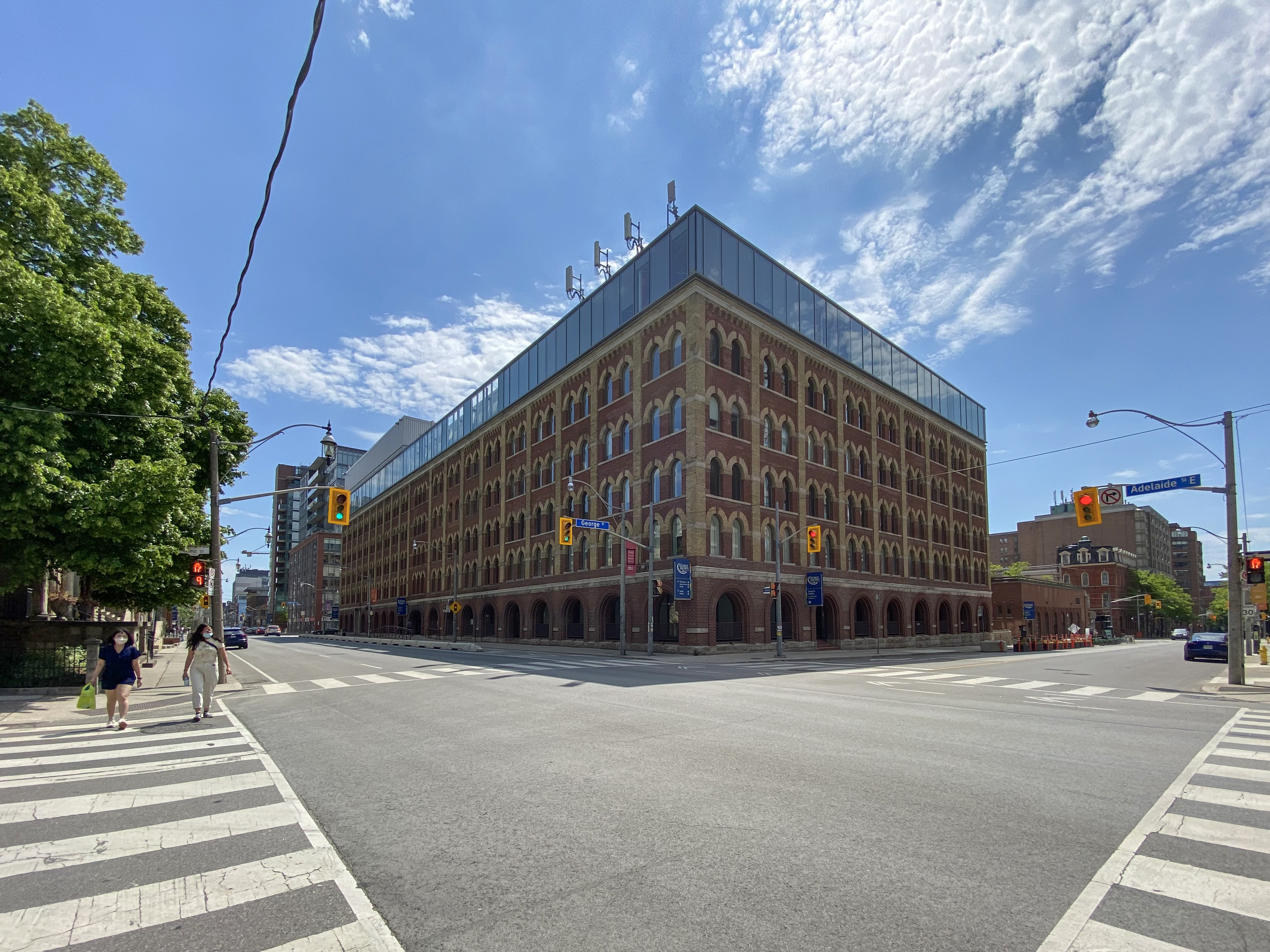
Main building for George Brown College St. James campus.

Four public school boards provide primary and secondary education to residents of Old Town. Two of the public school boards operate secular schools, the Conseil scolaire Viamonde (CSV), and the Toronto District School Board (TDSB); while the other two public school boards, Conseil scolaire catholique MonAvenir, and the Toronto Catholic District School Board (TCDSB) operates separate schools. TDSB and TCDSB operate English first language schools; whereas CSV, and MonAvenir operate French first language schools. However, students of these school boards attend institutions located outside Old Town, as none of the four school boards operate a school in the neighbourhood.

In addition to primary and secondary schools, Old Town is also home to George Brown College, a post-secondary college. The college operates several campuses in Toronto, including St. James campus in Old Town. St. James campus is made up of eight buildings, primarily situated on Adelaide Street East, King Street East, and Richmond Street East.

== Transportation ==
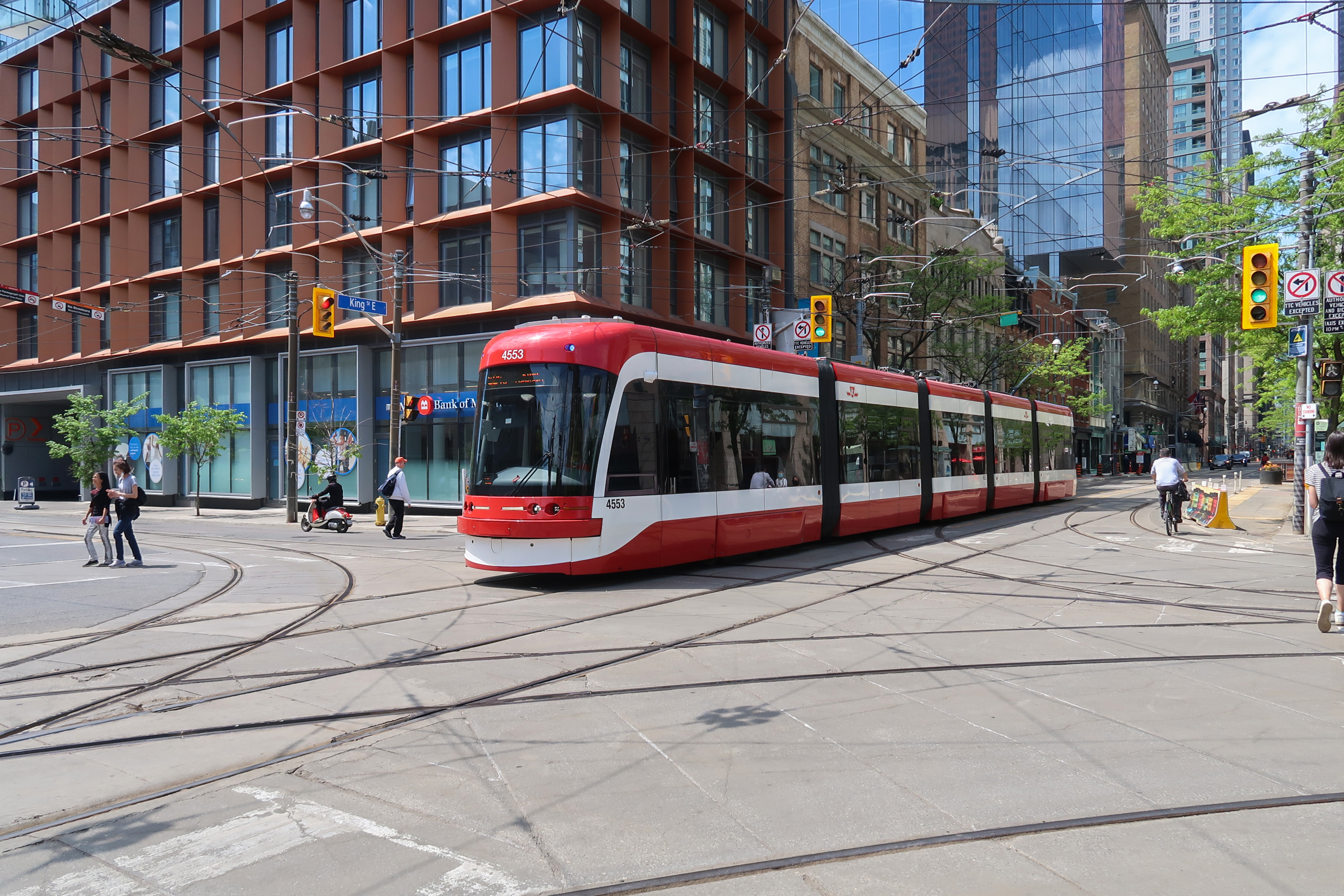
504 King is one of two TTC streetcar lines that operates within the neighbourhood.

Public transportation is provided by the Toronto Transit Commission's (TTC) streetcar and bus system. Two east-west streetcar lines operate through Old Town, the 501 Queen on Queen Street, and the 504 King on King Street. The TTC operates two north-south bus lines in the neighbourhood, 65 Parliament on Parliament Street, and 75 Sherbourne on Sherbourne Street. In addition to these bus routes, the TTC also operates an express route through the neighbourhood during rush hour.

Several major roadways serve as the neighbourhood's boundaries. Queen Street serves as Old Town's northern boundary, while Parliament Street serves as its eastern boundary. Church Street serves as the neighbourhood's western boundary north of King Street, whereas Jarvis Street serves as Old Town's western boundary of south of King Street East. Front Street serves as Old Town's southern boundary east of Jarvis Street, with the southwestern portion of the neighbourhood bounded by King Street.
