= Bank of Upper Canada Building =

Coordinates: 43°39′06.54″N 79°22′15.5″W

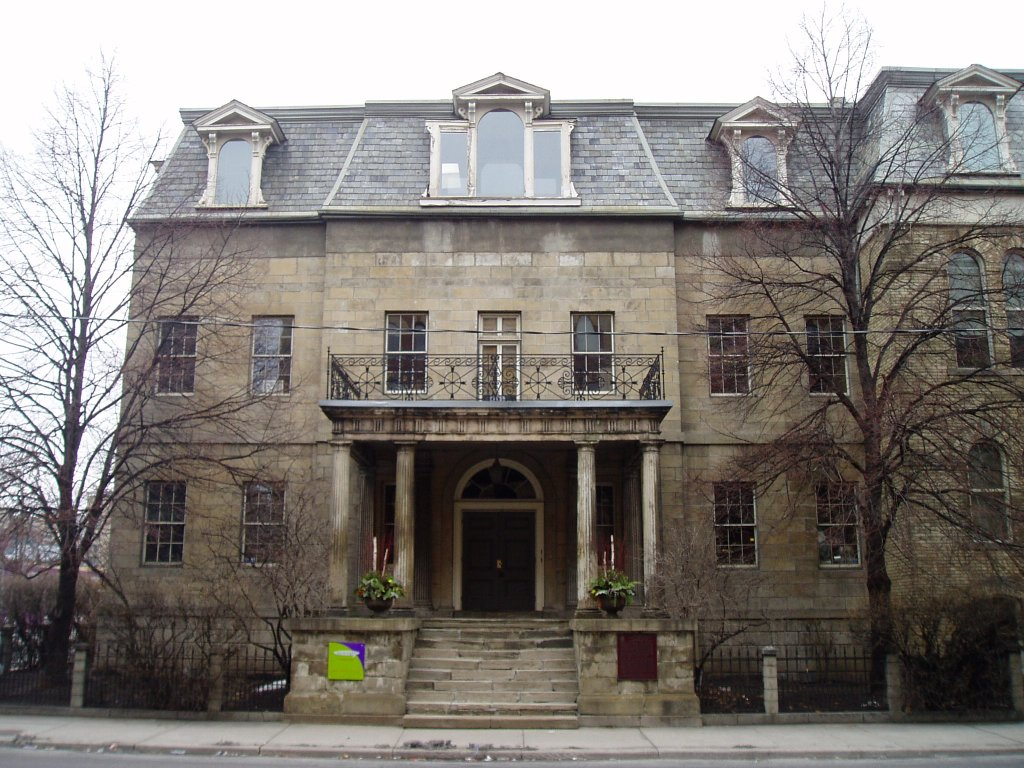
- Front of the building in 2005
- Interactive map of the Bank of Upper Canada Building area

General information
- Type: Office
- Architectural style: Neoclassical (with later mansard roof in the Second Empire style)
- Location: 252 Adelaide Street East; Toronto, Ontario, Canada
- Construction started: 1825
- Completed: 1827
- Renovated: 1982
- Client: Bank of Upper Canada
- Owner: Allied Properties REIT

Technical details
- Floor area: 7,500 square feet (700 m^{2}) (original); 2,500 square feet (230 m^{2}) (1851 addition)

National Historic Site of Canada
- Official name: Bank of Upper Canada Building National Historic Site of Canada
- Designated: June 6, 1977

Ontario Heritage Act
- Official name: Bank of Upper Canada Building
- Designated: November 26, 1975

The Bank of Upper Canada Building is a former bank building in Toronto, Ontario, Canada, and one of the few remaining buildings in Toronto that predate the 1834 incorporation of the city. It is located at 252 Adelaide Street East (originally 28 Duke Street), in the Old Town district. Opened in 1827, in what was then the town of York, the building housed the Bank of Upper Canada until the bank's collapse in 1866. It was then used for school purposes and later for various commercial and industrial purposes before being restored in 1982 as commercial office space. The building has been designated a National Historic Site of Canada since 1977.

== Description ==
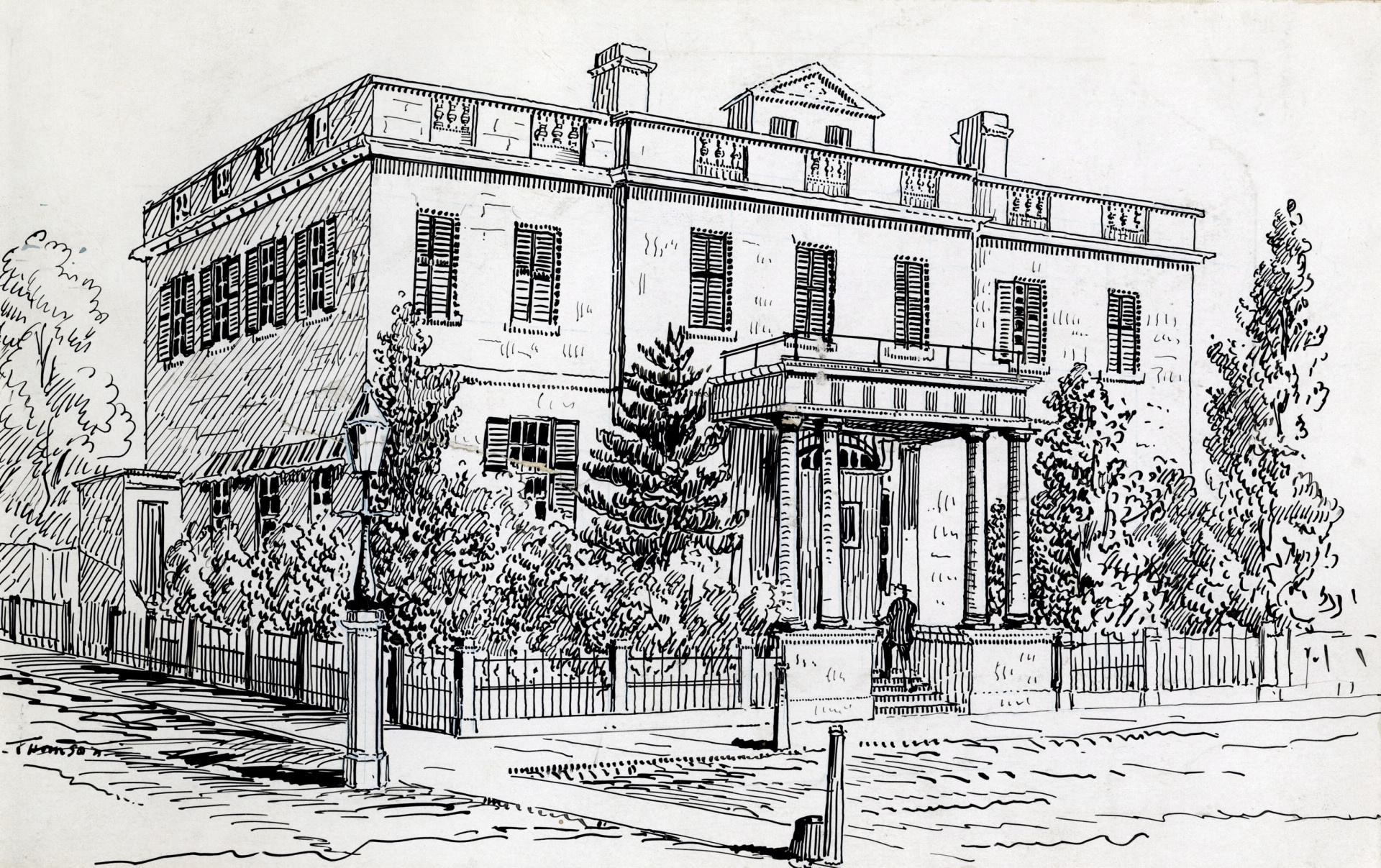
Image of the building in 1851, when it had two storeys and a flat roof

The limestone-clad building was completed in 1827 and originally had two storeys with a flat roof. The design is attributed to William Warren Baldwin, but it may have been designed by Francis Hall. The Doric portico, designed by John George Howard, was added in 1843.

Sometime after 1859, a new roof with dormers was added. In 1876, a mansard roof in the Second Empire style was added by the De La Salle Institute. As well, the building has been extended twice to the north, along George Street.

Stone Kohn Architects are responsible for the 1982 restoration design. The building is adjoined to the former De La Salle Institute building (1871) and Toronto's first post office building (1834) along Adelaide Street.

== History ==
The bank had opened in 1821 in a nearby store and then moved to the new building in 1827. At that time, it was one of the few stone buildings in York and was the town's first bank building. During the 1837 rebellion, William Lyon Mackenzie and the Reformers marched down Yonge Street with a plan to attack this building and steal the gold stored within – unsuccessfully. In 1851, the bank built an addition to the rear. The bank itself failed in 1866 and was put in receivership.

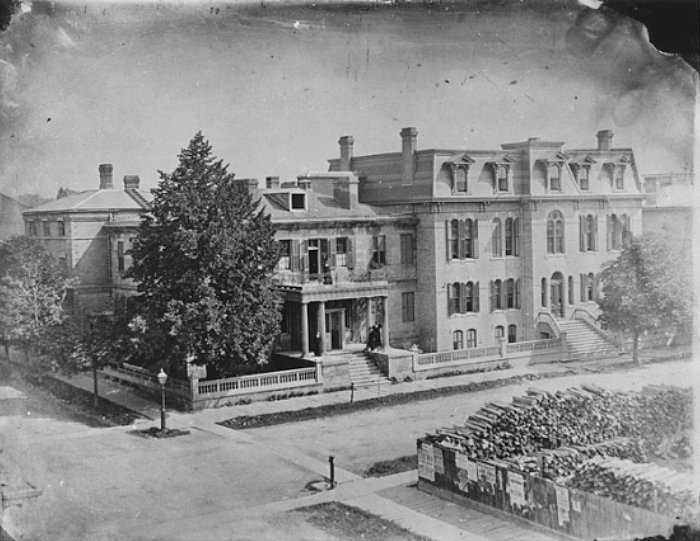
The building in 1872 (on the left), with the newly built De La Salle Institute on the right

The property was sold in 1870 to the De La Salle Brothers. In 1871, a Roman Catholic boys' school (De La Salle Institute, later known as De La Salle College) was built next door at 258 Adelaide Street, adjoining the bank building. In 1874, the school also bought 264 Adelaide Street, which had been built for the town's postmaster and that dates to 1834.

The Brothers sold the three buildings to the Catholic School Board in 1884 but used them rent-free after the sale. After the school started offering secondary classes, it took over the bank building as well. The school left the site in 1913.

Subsequently, the building was used for various purposes, including a meat processing plant, a recruitment centre during World War I, and industrial uses by Christie, Brown and Company and the United Farmers' Co-Operative Co. (UFC). In 1921, Christie Brown bought the building from the School Board, mostly for the rear yard property. The buildings were rented out to various commercial and industrial tenants, including a jeweler, machine shops and the Imperial Oil graphics department, which made Esso signs in the basement.

In 1925, the UFC bought the building to use as its head office. The bank building was used for offices, while the De La Salle and Post Office buildings were used for food storage. In 1926, the UFC built a three-storey addition to the north. The UFC sold the building in 1956.

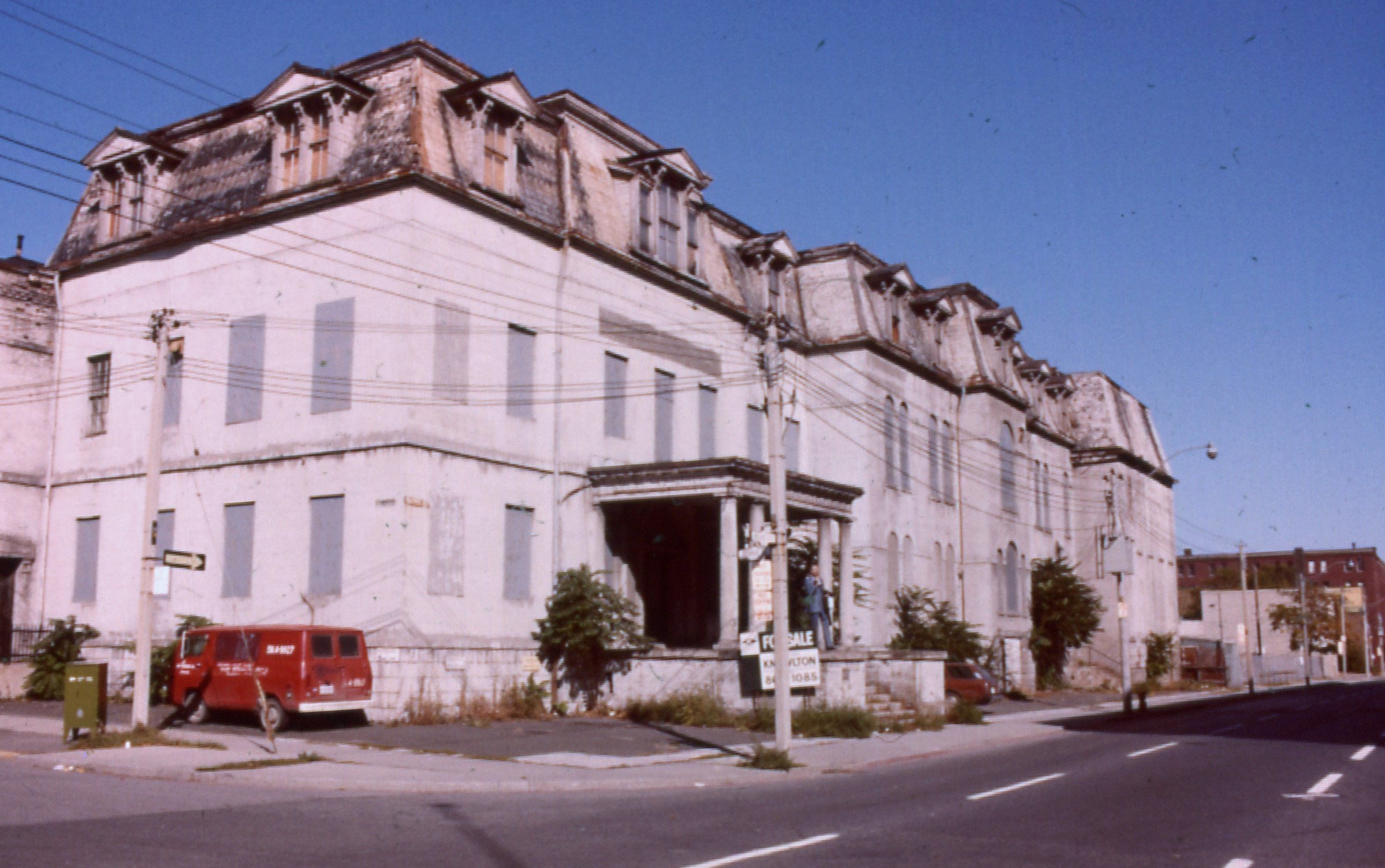
The building in 1977, when it was derelict before its restoration

The buildings were leased until 1971, when they were closed up – slated for demolition and redevelopment – and fell into decay. In 1978, a fire destroyed much of the roof, but by then the site had been declared a National Historic Site and an Ontario listed heritage building, and it had attracted the attention of lawyer Sheldon J. Godfrey and his wife Judith. The couple purchased the three buildings and supervised their restoration to completion in 1982. The building, along with the former college, is used today for commercial office space. As of October 2013, the property was being used by tech firm Myplanet, among others.

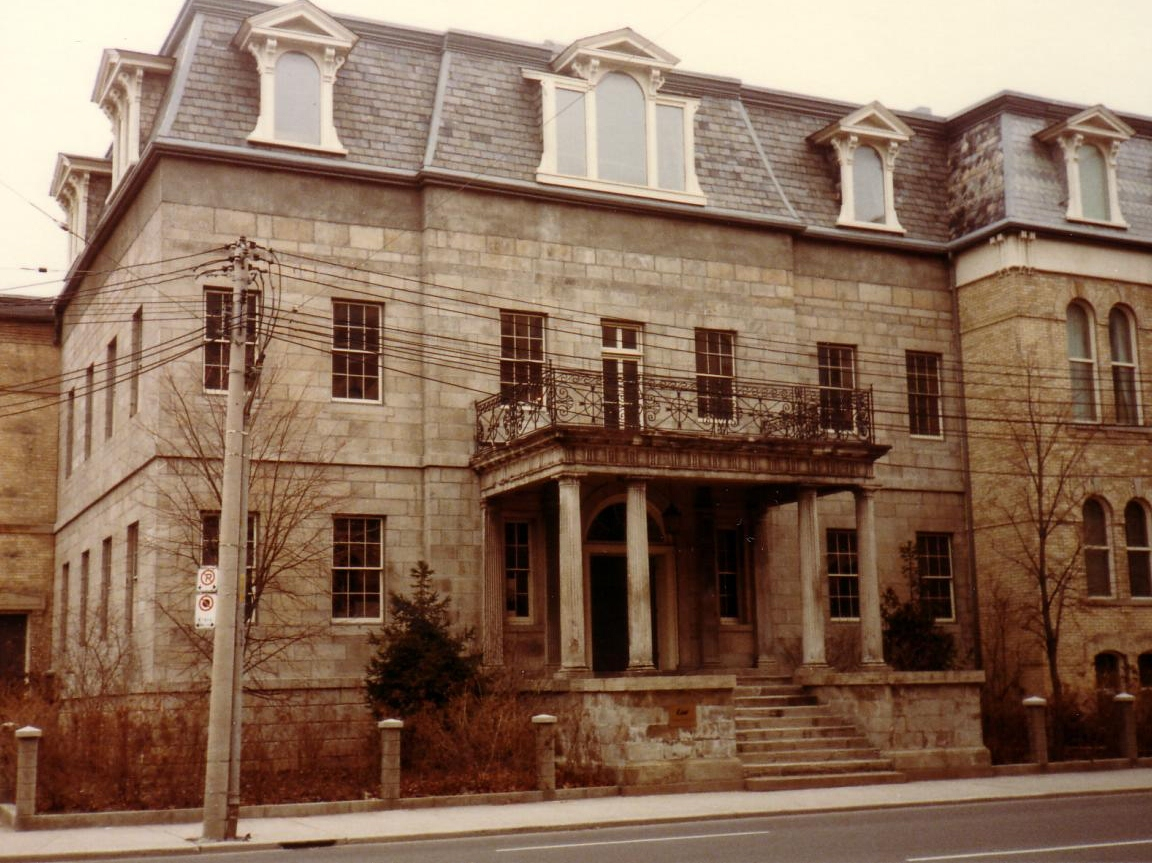
View of the building in 1983, after its restoration was completed

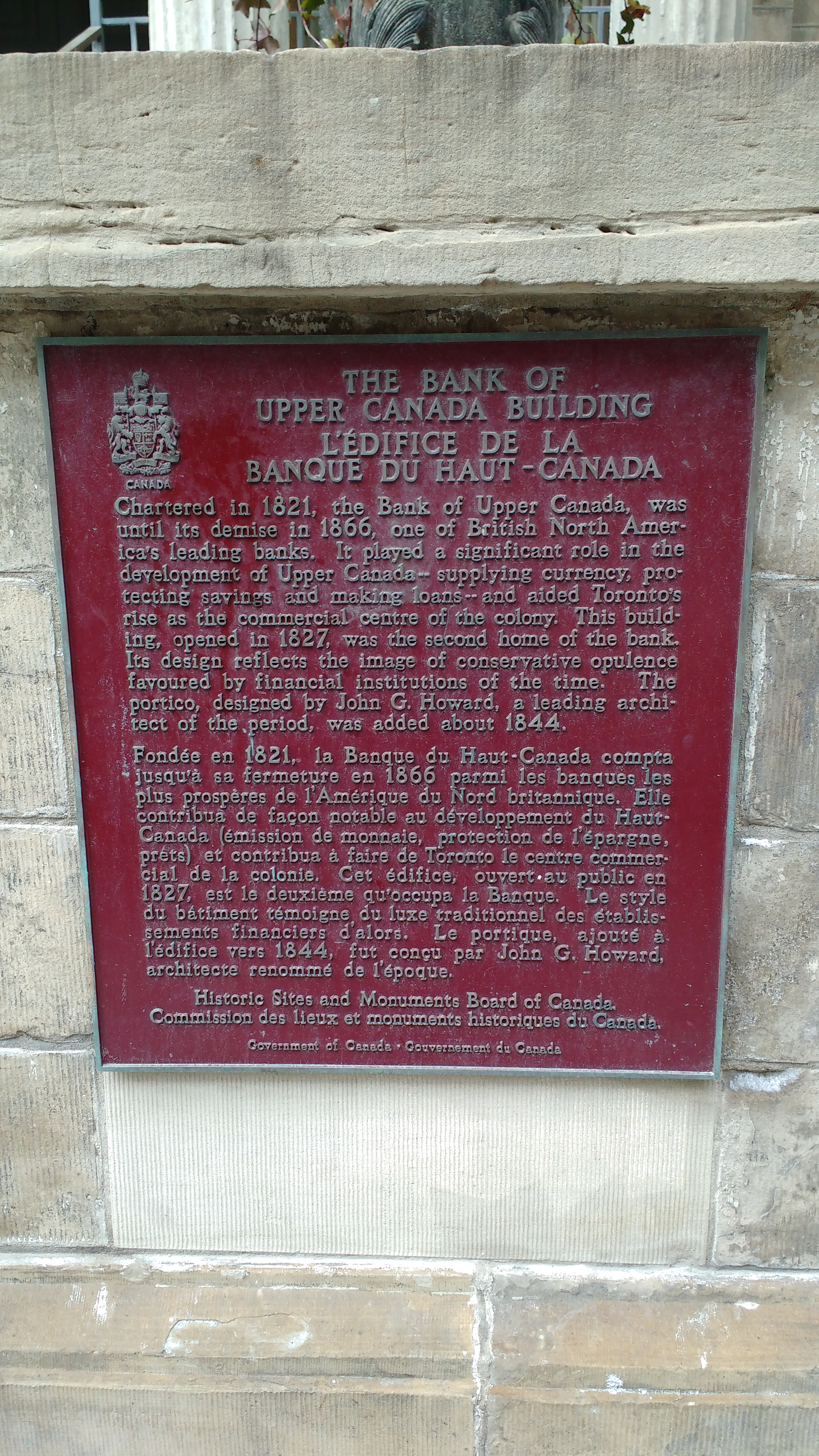
Plaque beside the front steps

The building is designated under Part IV of the Ontario Heritage Act, since 1975. Per the City's designation: "The Bank of Upper Canada, 252 Adelaide Street East (formerly 28 Duke Street) at George Street (NE), 1830, perhaps by W.W. Baldwin, additions c.1850, additions 1871 for De La Salle College, is designated to be of architectural value as being the home of the first major bank associated with the development of the Province of Ontario, and is probably the oldest surviving building built as a bank in Canada. The building is also important as a very early, exceptionally well-designed and quite well preserved late Georgian stone-built structure in the neo-Classical style. It is, moreover, the last remaining building of architectural importance in the Old Town of York area, where it and the later additions, especially those for De La Salle College, give it a dominance in the streetscape at Adelaide and George Street."

== See also ==
- List of historic places in Toronto
- List of oldest buildings and structures in Toronto
