= History of neighbourhoods in Toronto =

Throughout its history, Toronto has been a city divided into many districts and neighbourhoods. As the city has grown, new neighbourhoods have been created by expansion of the city into the countryside. Over time, the neighbourhoods within existing areas have also been altered and rearranged.

The variety and breadth of neighbourhoods within the city has led to the moniker "the city of neighbourhoods".

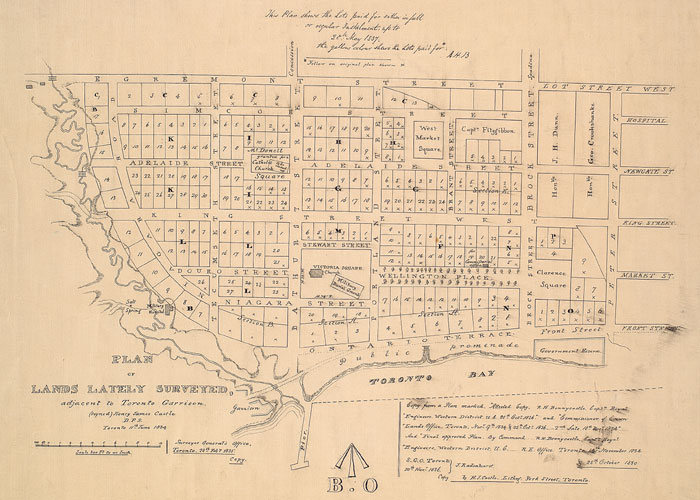
An 1837 planned extension of the New Town, showing the area west of Peter Street to Garrison Creek at Niagara Road

== New Town and Old Town ==
Before incorporation as a city in 1834, Toronto was known as York. For about two decades from its inception in 1793, most residents settled in an area bounded by present-day Jarvis and Parliament streets, south of Queen Street East (then known as Lot Street), and north of Front Street, which at the time was at the waterfront. By 1815, this area was known as Old Town, as a new neighbourhood formed to its west. Extending from present-day Jarvis street to Peter Street (and Blue Jay Way), south of Queen Street West and north of Front Street, this became known as New Town. Sparsely populated in 1815, New Town grew rapidly during the 1820s and 1830s, and a rivalry formed between the two neighbourhoods, especially for the location of the Parliament Buildings.

== The early ward system ==
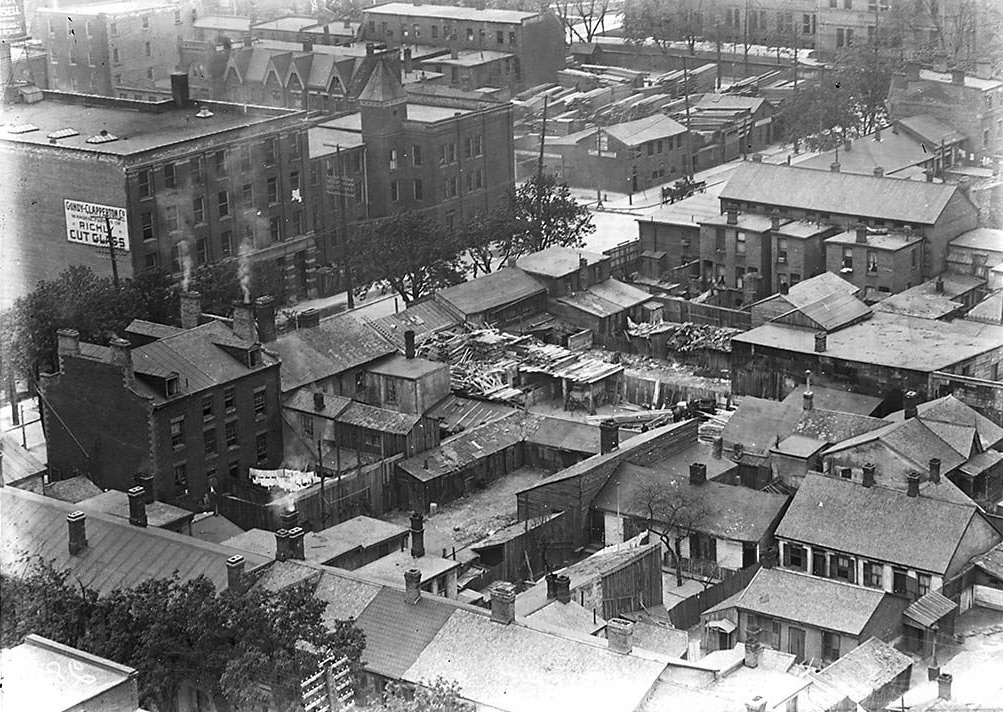
The Ward as seen in 1910. Once the centre of Toronto's Jewish community, it has been completely redeveloped.

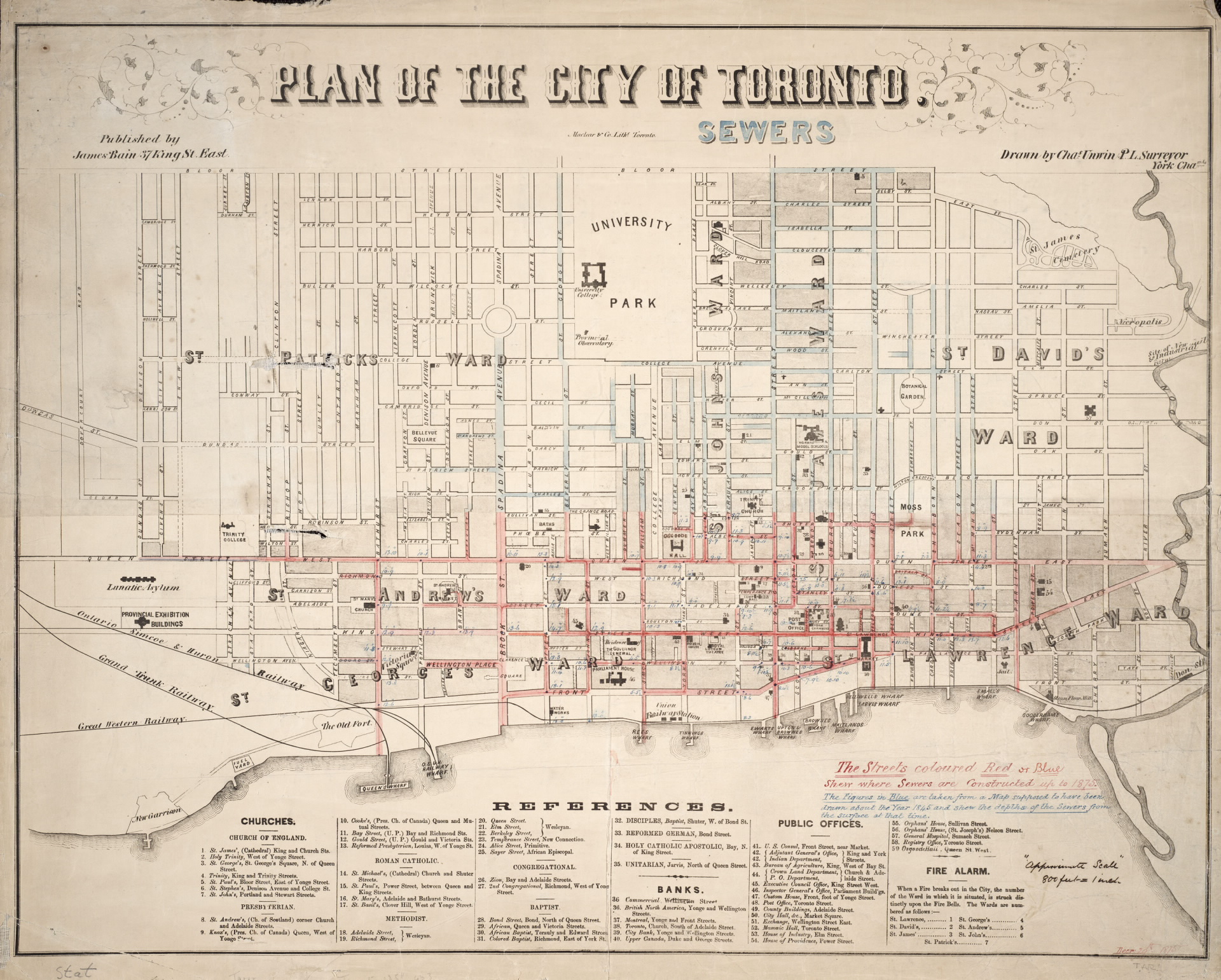
A map of Toronto in 1858, when the city was divided into seven wards

The earliest Toronto neighbourhoods were the five municipal wards that the city was split into in 1834. The wards were named for the patron saints of the four nations of the British Isles (St. George, St. Andrew, St. Patrick, and St. David) and St. Lawrence, the patron saint of Canada. Today, only St. Lawrence remains a well-known neighbourhood name. The others have attached their names to a variety of still existing landmarks including three subway stations. As Toronto grew, more wards were created, still named after prominent saints. St. James Ward is preserved in the modern St. James Town neighbourhood, while the northern ward of St. Paul's has continued to the present as a federal and provincial electoral district.

== Rural villages ==
Early 19th century Toronto was a town of a few thousand people. Most of the rest of the region that today makes up the city was rural farmland dotted with small villages. Some towns such as Norway have disappeared leaving only a few traces, but many others, such as Malvern and Wexford have become well known neighbourhoods in the Toronto suburbs. On the main routes leaving the city, small inns and taverns were established, often around the toll booths that were placed on the early highways and these often developed into small towns. There were three main routes out of the city: Kingston Road leading to the east, Yonge Street going north, and Dundas Street heading west. Weston Road was another early route that saw some communities develop. A second type of town that developed in the hinterland surrounding early Toronto were small towns to support the farms that covered most of the region. These tended to develop at the intersection of two concession roads and were usually based around a post office or a small church.

Village	Location	Founded	Notes
Agincourt	Brimley and Sheppard	Post office 1858	Farming town with a post office and general store
Armadale	Markham Road and Steeles	Settled c. 1805 post office 1869	Originally known as Magdala
Bendale	Lawrence and McCowan	Settled 1799, post office 1878	Originally known as Benlomond
Bedford Park	Yonge and Lawrence	Bedford Park Hotel opened 1873	
Birch Cliff	Kingston and Birchmount	Post office 1908	
Brockton	Dundas St W	Settled 1830s, incorporated 1876	
Brown's Corners	Finch and Markham	Post office 1856	Post office closed and moved to Malvern in 1865
Chester	Danforth and Chester	1850s	Also known as Doncaster, origin of the name of Chester subway station
Coleman's Corners	Danforth and Dawes	1877	Named after Charles Coleman, first postmaster of the post office established in 1877. Also known as Little York.
Davisville	Yonge and Davisville	Post office 1840s	
Don Vale	Winchester and Don River	1840s	Grew up around an inn by one of the main crossings of the Don
Downsview	Keele and Wilson	Settled 1842	
Dublin	Sheppard and Dufferin		
Eglinton	Yonge and Eglinton	1800s	Also spelled as Eglington
Elia	Keele and Finch	Settled 1790s, post office 1878	
Ellesmere	Kennedy and Ellesmere	Post office 1853	
Emery	Weston and Finch	Settled 1790s, post office 1879	Also known as Dayton
Fairbanks	Dufferin and Eglinton	Settled 1834, post office 1874	Also spelled as Fairbank
Flynntown	Leslie and Sheppard		
Highland Creek	Kingston Road and Highland Creek	Settled 1802	First community in Scarborough
Hillside	Finch and Meadowvale Road	School built 1847	
Islington	Dundas and Islington		
Kaiserville	Jane and Steeles		
Lambton Mills	Humber and Dundas	Settled 1806	Originally named Cooper's Mills
L'Amoreaux	Finch and Birchmount	Settled 1816, school built 1847	
Lansing	Yonge and Sheppard	Settled 1798, post office 1866	
Leaside	Millwood and McRae	Settled 1819	
Leslieville	Queen and Leslie	1850s	Grew up around an inn on what was then Kingston Road
Malvern	Sheppard and Markham Road	Post office 1865	Sheppard and Markham Road was originally known as Malcolm's Corners, likely named after John and Robert Malcolm.
Markland Wood	Bloor Street, Toronto's westernmost neighbourhood	1960	Originally known as Silverthorn Farm
Milneford Mills	Don River and Old Lawrence Road	1830s	Demolished to make way for DVP
Milliken	Kennedy and Steeles	Post office 1859	
Moffat's Corners	St. Clair and Victoria Park	1863	Post office established to serve rural area in 1863. Also known as Strangford.
Mortlake	Midland and Kingston Rd	1865	Grew around the Halfway House Hotel
Newtonbrook	Yonge and Drewry		
Norway	Woodbine and Kingston Road	c. 1835	Toll gate and then a small sawmill built on main route east of town
Port Union	Lawrence and Port Union Road	Post office 1865	
Rowntree Mills	Humber River south of Steeles	Settled 1840s	
Scarborough Village	Markham and Eglinton	Post office 1832	First post office in Scarborough, and origin of the name for the entire township
Smithfield	Albion and Martingrove		
Thistletown	Humber and Albion Rd		Also known as St. Andrew's and Coonats Corner
Todmorden Mills	Greenwood and Don River	c. 1795	Established around a lumber mill built to provide wood for the construction of York
Weston	Weston Road at Lawrence West	Incorporated in 1881	
Wexford	Lawrence and Pharmacy	School built 1847	
Willowdale	Yonge and Sheppard	Settled 1797	
Woburn	Markham and Old Danforth Road	Post office 1852	Known as Elderslie until 1856
York Mills	Yonge and York Mills	First mill built 1804	

== Railway towns ==
In the second half of the nineteenth century, several rail lines were built across the Toronto area. This led to another group of towns being founded as rail lines and rail stations quickly became focal points for the creation of new towns and neighbourhoods. The most important was the Grand Trunk Railway line running along the shore of Lake Ontario. The central Union Station was the meeting point of a number of lines, and this contributed to the growth of industry throughout the area between Queen Street and the lakeshore. East and west of downtown, the major stations were established at Parkdale and Riverside South, which both became centres of activity. Hotels, such as the Gladstone and New Broadview House, opened to serve travellers.

Parts of town that had once been home to small rural communities were transformed by the railway into major industrial areas. To the northwest of the city, the small towns of Carleton and Davenport were subsumed into The Junction and it became the site of many large factories and warehouses. To the east, the towns of Strangford and Mortlake became known as Scarborough Junction.

Further away from town, the railways also altered geography. New communities developed around railway yards and facilities to house the workers. The largest of these was East Toronto, which developed east of the city around the Grand Trunk's main yards. In the eastern part of Scarborough, Irish railway workers built up the town of West Hill. The existing small town of Leaside grew rapidly after a maintenance yard was built nearby.

== Urban slums and streetcar suburbs ==
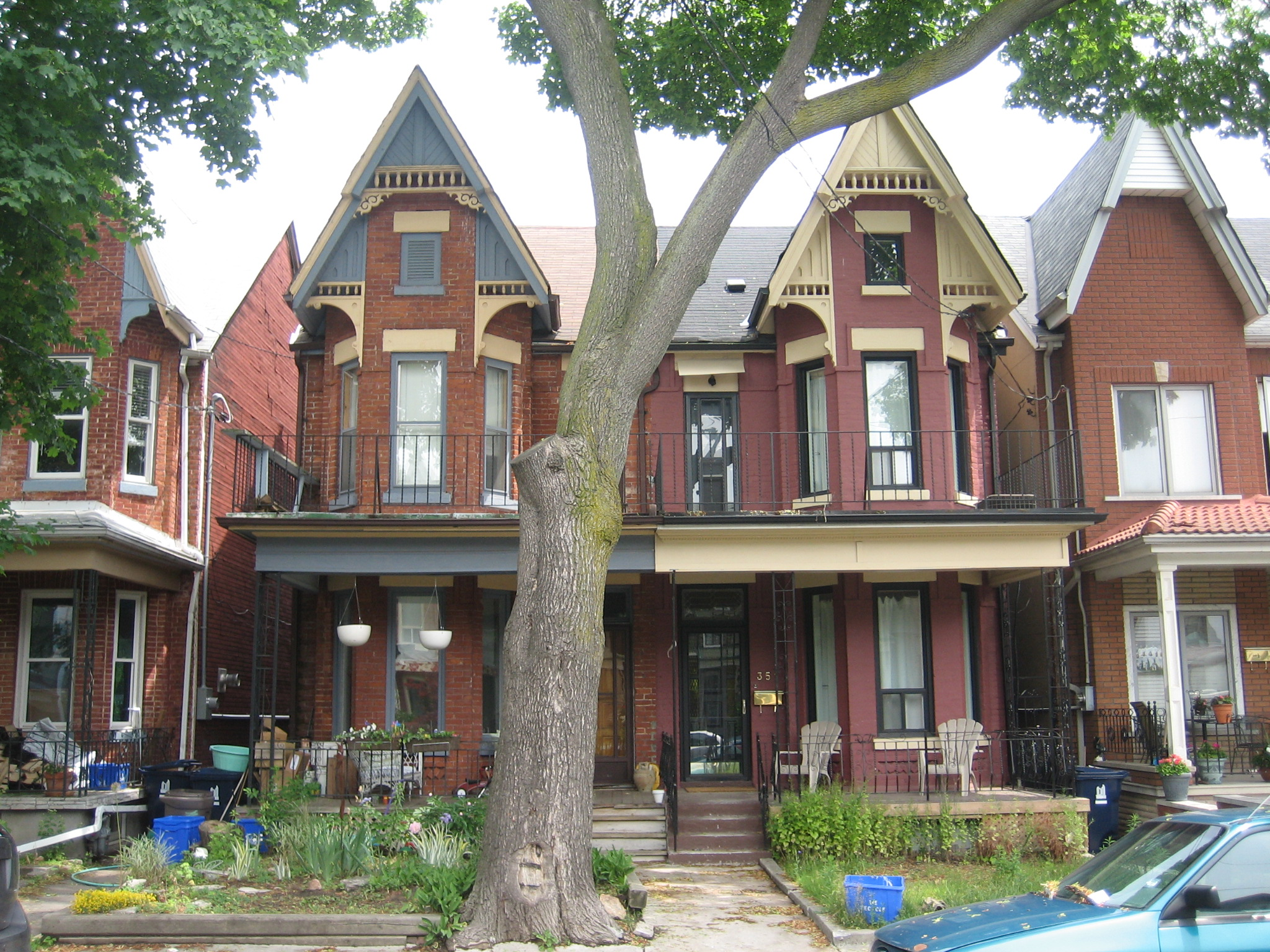
A pair of semi-detached bay-and-gable houses, a style found throughout Toronto in the late 19th and early 20th century

By the end of the 19th century, the centre of old Toronto had become an almost wholly industrial and commercial area. Some residents stayed behind in these districts, generally poorer citizens and newly arrived immigrants. These became some of Toronto's first ethnically-based neighbourhoods. The working class Irish who laboured in many of the factories were concentrated in the eastern part of the city, and these neighbourhoods were named Cabbagetown and Corktown after them. Jewish immigrants also began arriving in considerable numbers at the end of the 19th century, and they settled in a region that was known as The Ward, centred at the corner of Bay Street and a collection of side streets that would later become Dundas Street. In the early 20th century, Chinatown would develop into another important neighbourhood just to the east.

Middle and upper class residents left the core and moved into new areas further out, creating a number of new neighbourhoods. A ring of former farmland around the city was thus developed into new residential areas. These included The Annex, named for its annexation to the city of Toronto, and the former village of Yorkville. This process accelerated considerably at the end of the century with the introduction of the streetcar. The streetcar allowed residents living outside the central business district to travel to work with ease. New areas, again mostly middle and upper class, grew up along the streetcar lines creating new neighbourhoods like Riverdale, The Beaches, Birch Cliff, North Toronto, and Parkdale. Working class streetcar suburbs developed in New Toronto, Mimico and Long Branch in what is now Etobicoke.

== Postal districts ==
By the 1920s, most of the neighbourhoods of old Toronto had been established. In a non-comprehensive list a 1925 writer to the Toronto Star listed Rosedale, Riverdale, Parkdale High Park, Junction, Danforth, Earlscourt, Wychwood, Willowvale, North Toronto, Beach, and Leaside. All of these neighbourhoods are still commonly used today, with the exception of Willowvale, which is now known as Christie Pits, the name of the park it surrounds having been changed the same way.

In 1925, the Post Office divided Toronto into ten postal zones (see map), in an effort to facilitated mail sorting in an era before postal codes. There was no obligation to use the zone numbers, and were originally not widely adopted. After the Second World War, the zone numbers did begin to be used extensively. The postal districts became one of the primary ways of dividing up the city. Residents frequently described themselves as living in Toronto 2 or Toronto 10. The system was retained until 1971, with gradual modification. New zones were added as the city expanded outwards and downtown zones were subdivided as the number of homes and businesses in the core increased. By 1966, the urban areas of the city were covered by 19 zones, while more distant areas had one-letter codes, such as R for Rexdale and W for Willowdale.

== The suburbs and downtown clearances ==
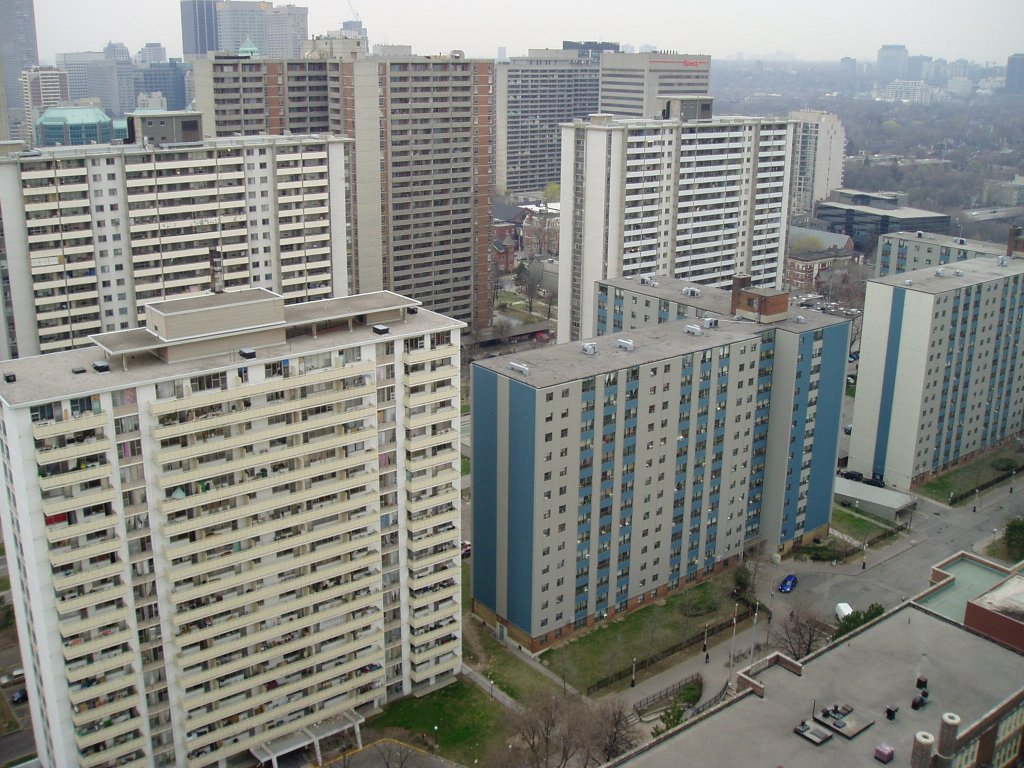
St. James Town

The years after the Second World War saw a dramatic change to the neighbourhoods of Toronto. The automobile made even more distant suburbs possible, and the baby boom encouraged their rapid construction. The next thirty years saw an explosion of growth in the townships around the city, and the region that soon became known as Metro Toronto. Scarborough, North York, and Etobicoke were transformed from largely rural farmland into vast stretches of housing. The early suburban developers did not put much emphasis on creating neighbourhoods, though in time many of these areas developed strong communities. Some suburbs embraced the names of the small villages that had once been there. Many others were given monikers by the developers marketing the projects.

During this same era the downtown neighbourhoods saw significant changes. The Financial District was growing northwards and The Ward and many of the oldest parts of Chinatown were demolished to make way for new projects, such as Toronto City Hall. The Yorkville neighbourhood was also transformed from one of homes to one of hotels and stores.

The government also demolished many other areas labelled as "slums", replacing them with modern housing projects that were hypothesized to lead to much better lives for the inhabitants. Thus large parts of Cabbagetown and Corktown were levelled to build Regent Park and Moss Park, while St. James Town was transformed into a series of massive highrises similar to Le Corbusier's "Towers in the Park" plan. In the suburbs, municipal governments also created new high rise neighbourhoods such as Flemingdon Park and Crescent Town. Such projects came to a halt by the end of the 1970s when it was realized that such housing projects often became poverty stricken and crime ridden, while many of the untouched parts of Cabbagetown were quickly becoming some of the most desirable in the city. Under mayor David Crombie, new attempts at social housing were launched, such as the St. Lawrence neighbourhood. These have managed to obtain similar densities without the social problems of earlier projects.

== Neighbourhood revival ==
In the post-war years many traditional neighbourhood names faded as postal district numbers were in common use and many older neighbourhoods declined. The name Riverdale was one that faded as the once middle class area became much poorer. A 1964 Toronto Star series labelled the entire area north of Gerrard as The Danforth. A real estate agent working in the area for several years in the 1970s also reported never hearing the area referred to as Riverdale.

Residents and real estate soon found that giving neighbourhoods distinct names and identities made them more attractive. The 1970s thus saw much of the city divided into neighbourhoods. Older neighbourhood names were restored, such as Riverdale, though not before an attempt by real estate agents to rechristen the area Cabbagetown II, after the rapidly gentrifying area across the river. Other areas that had never before had clear names were given them. Some like Leslieville were taken from historic villages that once existed in the area. Others were based upon neighbouring districts such as the Upper Beaches. Not all such attempts at naming areas were successful. Attempts to dub areas as Chester Village or the South Annex never won acceptance.

== Post-industrial Toronto ==
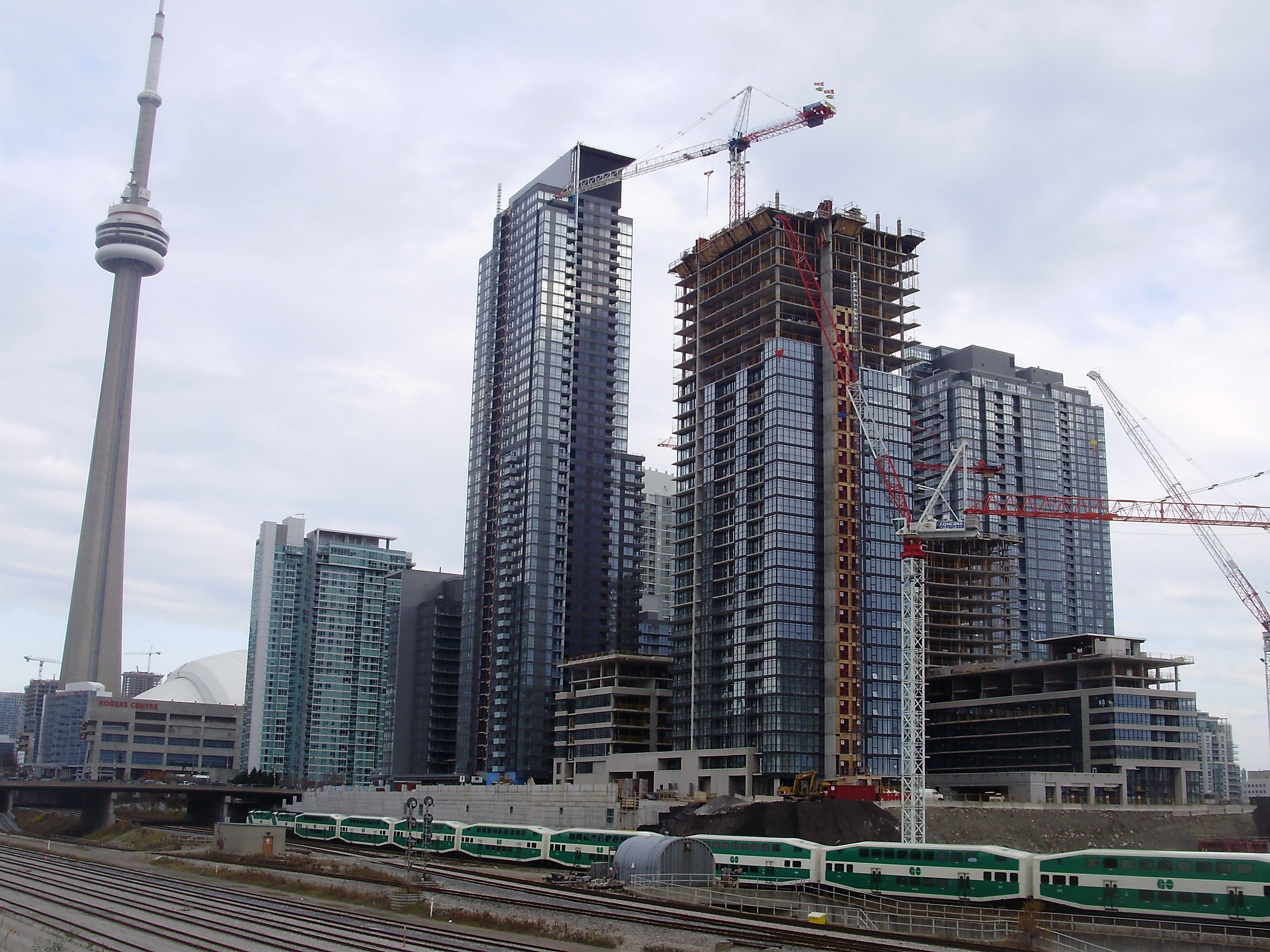
Buildings under construction at CityPlace

By the 1980s almost all the open areas within the limits of Metro Toronto had been developed, with most of the growth in brand new developments occurring in the belt around Toronto known as the 905. This same era saw a deindustrialization of central Toronto, as almost all the factories and warehouses that had once dominated the waterfront disappeared. This created wide expanses for new developments and new neighbourhoods. A number of new communities have developed and are developing in these post-industrial zones, the largest of them being CityPlace on the former railway lands. To the west and east other residential and cultural zones have appeared in areas such as Liberty Village and the Distillery District. Other stretches of the waterfront, such as the West Donlands, and the Portlands are still mostly empty, and awaiting redevelopment programmes.

With the disappearance of open spaces in the city of Toronto and the revitalization of the downtown there has been considerable condominium construction creating residential communities in areas that were once almost wholly commercial, such as the Financial District and Yorkville. The suburbs have also seen considerable densification. North York Centre has grown into a large cluster of condominiums and office buildings and a similar, though less dramatic process, is occurring at Scarborough City Centre. Since the completion of the Sheppard subway line in 2002, there has been a boom in condominium construction along the route.

There are 158 neighbourhoods officially recognized by the City of Toronto (in 2022, 34 neighbourhoods were created from 16 of the previous 140) and upwards of 240 official and unofficial neighbourhoods within city limits.

== See also ==
- History of Toronto
- List of neighbourhoods in Toronto
- Architecture of Toronto
