= Toronto's First Post Office =

- Fourth York Post Office
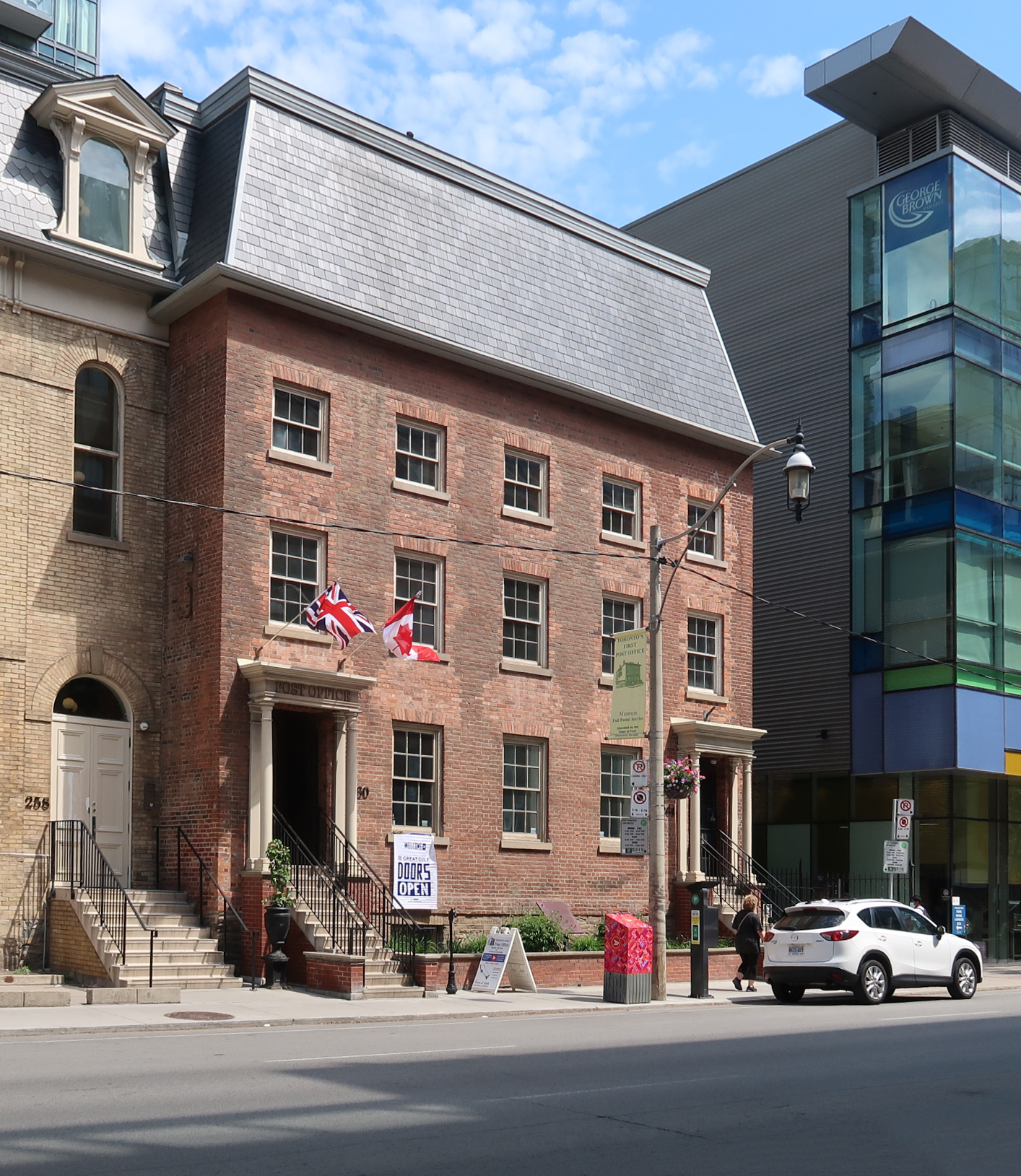
- Interactive map of Toronto's First Post Office
- 43°39′06.65″N 79°22′14.34″W
- Location: 260 Adelaide Street East; Toronto, Ontario

History
- Built: 1833–4
- Original use: Post office and home

Site notes
- Current use: Museum and post outlet/authorized postal dealer
- Governing body: Town of York Historical Society
- Website: townofyork.com

National Historic Site of Canada
- Official name: Fourth York Post Office
- Designated: June 16, 1980

Ontario Heritage Act
- Designated: November 26, 1975

Toronto's First Post Office (also known as the Fourth York Post Office National Historic Site) is a historic post office in Toronto, Ontario. It is the oldest purpose-built post office in Canada that functioned as a department of the British Royal Mail, and the only surviving example. After its initial use as a post office, it became part of a Roman Catholic boys' school (De La Salle College) and later a cold storage building. Located at 260 Adelaide Street East in downtown Toronto, the building now houses a museum and a full-service post office, run by the Town of York Historical Society.

== History ==
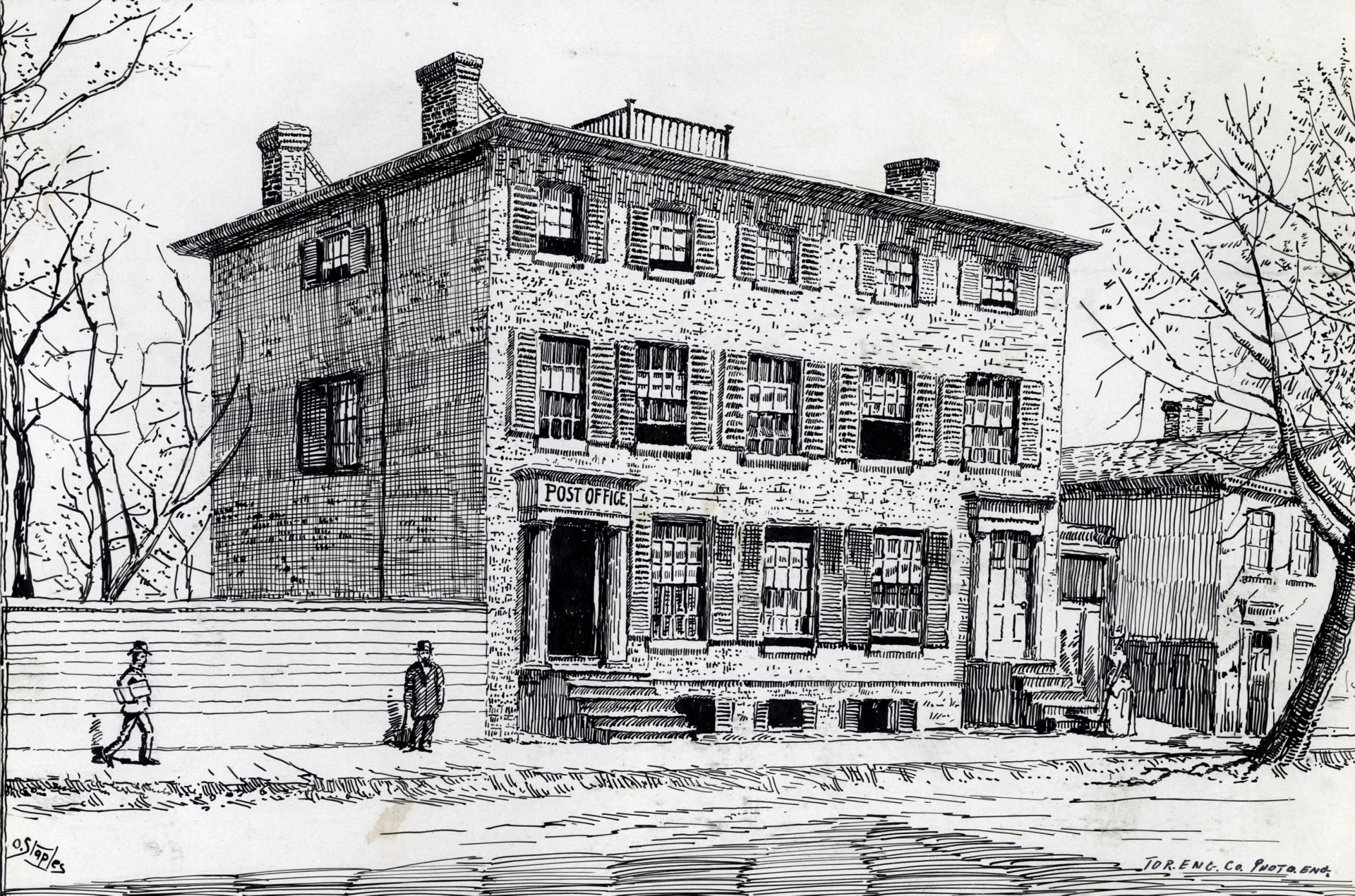
The building c. 1839

The building opened in 1833, before York became the City of Toronto. Therefore, the post office is known both as the "Fourth York Post Office" (as there had been three prior post offices in the settlement) and "Toronto's First Post Office" (as it was the first post office to serve the newly incorporated city). The building served as a post office until 1837. James Scott Howard served as the first postmaster.

Some sources, such as John Ross Robertson, say that this building, although built in 1832, was not used as a post office until 1836. The first city directories of Toronto identify this building, but they also identify the older post office in town (the second post office) as being an active post office in the city. This would mean that this building was one of two post offices that existed when Toronto was founded and would have been the newer post office of the time.

In 1839, the post office moved to Front Street and Yonge. The building is rented out to various tenants until 1841 when it is sold to Thomas Harris, who lives in it until 1870. Harris sold the building in 1873 to the Christian Brothers order who integrate it into De La Salle Institute Catholic boys' school next door.

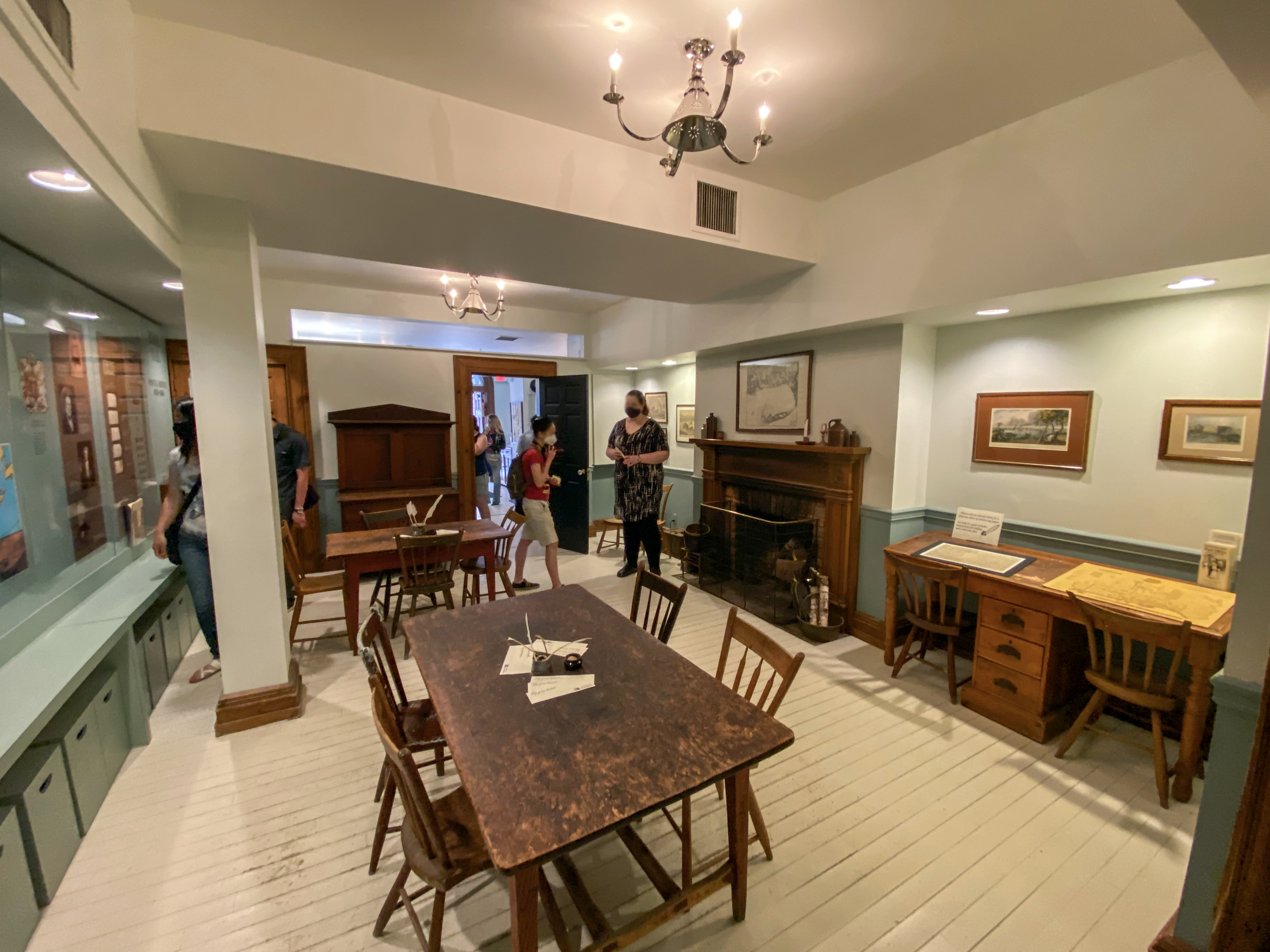
Museum inside the post office

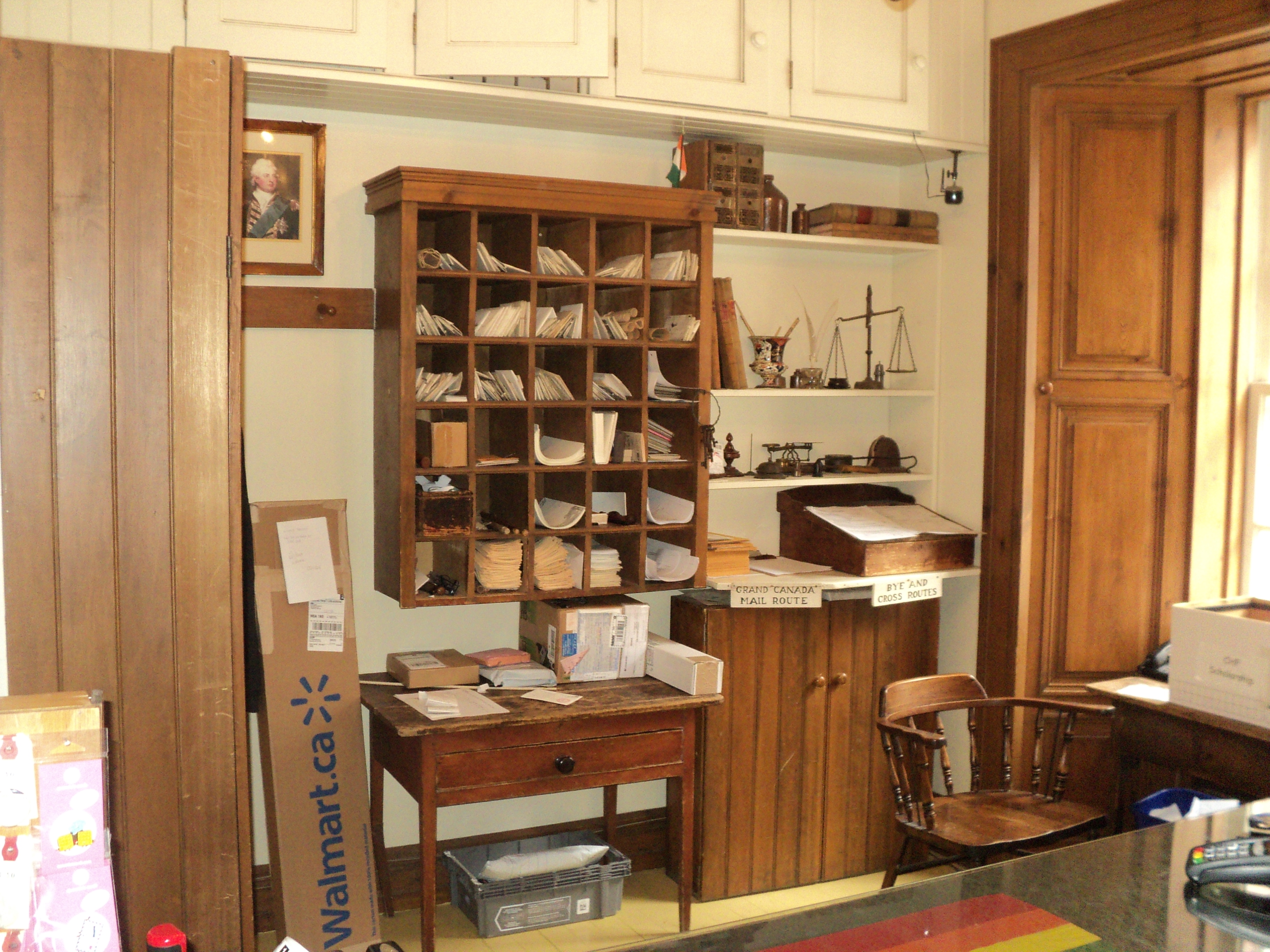
Postal counter inside the building. The building operates as a full-service post office and period museum.

After the school vacated the building in 1913, the building was leased for various uses including a World War I air force recruiting office. In 1920, Christie, Brown and Company, owner of the biscuit factory across the street purchase the property, using the rear yard for its use and the building was commercial space. In 1925, the United Farmers' Co-Operative Company bought the building along with the adjoining De La Salle building and the Bank of Upper Canada building. The former post office building was converted into a cold storage food warehouse, and used in this way until 1956, when UFC sold the building. During this period, all of its windows were bricked up. The building was used for various uses until 1971, when it was closed up and left vacant, waiting for demolition and redevelopment.

The building, along with the De La Salle and bank building was bought by Sheldon and Judith Godfrey for restoration. The Godfreys discovered that the building was in fact the old post office building. It was designated a National Historic Site of Canada in 1980. The property is also protected under Part IV of the Ontario Heritage Act since 1975 and also enjoys an Ontario Heritage Foundation Easement Agreement since 2015.

The First Post Office museum opened in 1983.

== Current use ==
The building was re-opened in 1983 with its present use as museum and period-style post office. The museum is Canada's oldest surviving purpose-built post office, serving as both a museum and full-service postal outlet. Toronto's First Post Office is an authorized full-service dealer for Canada Post. Toronto's First Post Office is operated by the Town of York Historical Society.

== Architecture ==
The style of the building is late Georgian architecture. It was originally a three-storey building, with two front doors, one for the private residence and one for the post office proper. At the time, postmasters lived in the same building as their post office. The fourth-storey roof was added in 1876, while the building was part of De La Salle Institute (today's De La Salle College), a Roman Catholic boys' school, which had built an adjoining building between the post office and the Bank of Upper Canada Building to the west.

== See also ==
- List of museums in Toronto
- List of National Historic Sites of Canada in Toronto
- List of oldest buildings and structures in Toronto
- Toronto Street Post Office
