= Bank of Upper Canada =

Canadian bank (1819–1866)

- Industry: Banking
- Founded: 1821; 205 years ago in pre-Confederation Province of New Brunswick, Canada
- Founders: John Strachan; William Allan
- Defunct: 1866
- Headquarters: Bank of Upper Canada Building, Toronto, Ontario,
- Key people: William Allan (first president)

The Bank of Upper Canada was established in 1821 under a charter granted by the legislature of Upper Canada in 1819 to a group of Kingston merchants. The charter was appropriated by the more influential Executive Councillors to the Lt. Governor, the Rev. John Strachan and William Allan, and moved to Toronto. The bank was closely associated with the group that came to be known as the Family Compact, and it formed a large part of their wealth. The association with the Family Compact and its underhanded practices made Reformers, including Mackenzie, regard the Bank of Upper Canada as a prop of the government. Complaints about the bank were a staple of Reform agitation in the 1830s because of its monopoly and aggressive legal actions against debtors.

== History ==
=== Bank of the Family Compact ===
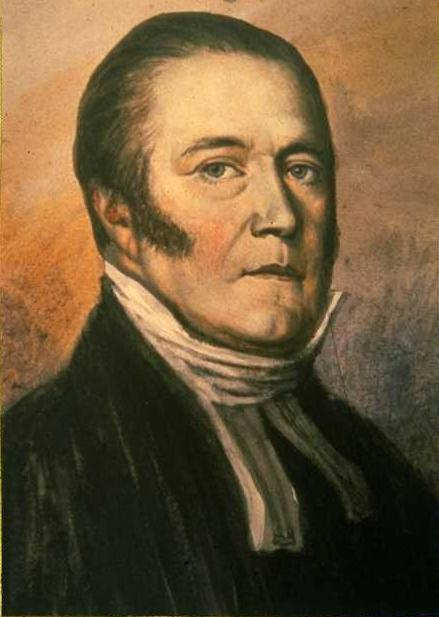
John Strachan

The first Bank of Upper Canada was located on the south-east corner of King and Frederick streets in York, Upper Canada (later Toronto, Canada West). York was then too small for a bank, and its promoters were unable to raise even the minimal 10% of the £200,000 authorized capital required for start-up. The bank succeeded only because its promoters had the political influence to have that minimum reduced by half, and the provincial government subscribed for 2000 of its 8000 shares. The lieutenant-governor appointed four of the bank's fifteen directors, making for a tight bond between the nominally private company and the state. Despite the tight bonds, the Receiver General, the reform-leaning John Henry Dunn, refused to use the bank for government business.

The bank's principal promoters were the Rev. John Strachan and William Allan. William Allan, who became president, was also an Executive and Legislative Councillor. He, like Strachan, played a key role in solidifying the Family Compact and ensuring its influence within the colonial state. Forty-four men served as bank directors during the 1830s; eleven of them were executive councillors, fifteen of them were legislative councillors, and thirteen were magistrates in Toronto. More importantly, all 11 men who had ever sat on the Executive Council also sat on the board of the bank at one time or another. Ten of the men also sat on the Legislative Council. The overlapping membership on the boards of the Bank of Upper Canada and on the Executive and Legislative Councils served to integrate the economic and political activities of the church, state, and the "financial sector." The overlapping memberships reinforced the oligarchic nature of power in the colony and allowed the administration to operate without any effective elective check. Henry John Boulton, the solicitor general, author of the bank incorporation bill and the bank's lawyer, admitted the bank was a "terrible engine in the hands of the provincial administration."

William Lyon Mackenzie, the Reform politician and newspaper publisher, was the first to demonstrate the nature of that oligarchic power by showing that the government, its officers, and legislative councillors owned 5,381 of its 8,000 shares. Once elected to the House of Assembly, he criticized the Bank's lack of transparency and accountability to the legislature.

==== Bank officers of the Family Compact ====
- William Allan (1822–1835), President 1822-1835
- William Proudfoot (1835–1861)
- Thomas Gibbs Ridout, cashier (general manager) (1822–1861)
- Henry John Boulton, lawyer (1825-1833)

=== The "Pretended Bank" (at Kingston) and the Commercial Bank of the Midland District ===
The Bank of Upper Canada at York (Toronto) had obtained its charter at the expense of the larger, more economically developed town of Kingston. Deprived of their charter, they established an unchartered bank in 1818 supported with American capital. The government refused to accept its notes given its American ties, and it went bankrupt in 1822. After its failure, the Bank of Upper Canada used all of its influence to prevent any other bank from being chartered in the province. The monopoly was crucial to keeping its notes in circulation and boosting its profits. It succeeded only until 1832, when the Commercial Bank of the Midland District was chartered finally giving Kingston the bank it desired.

=== Banknotes ===
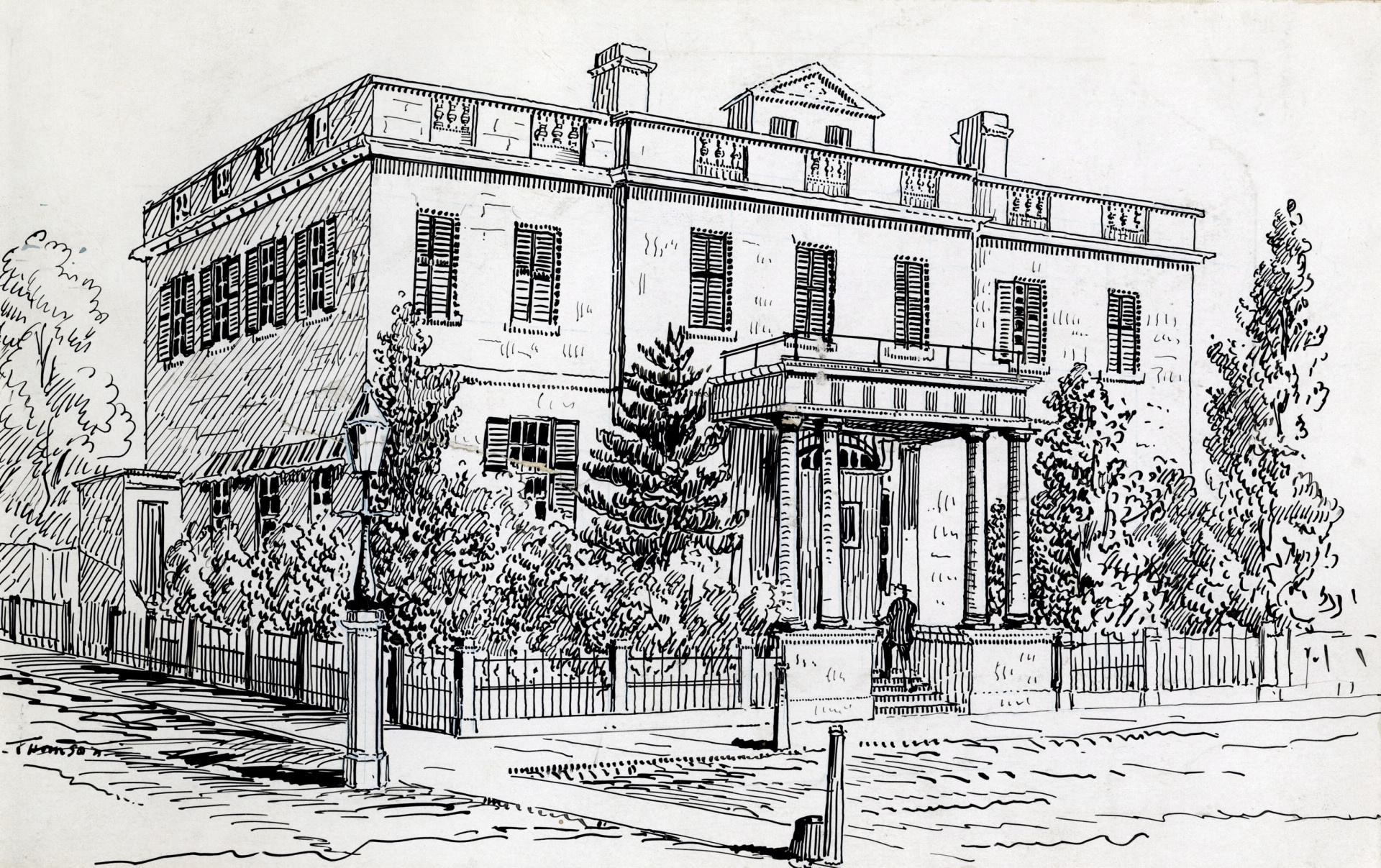
The headquarters on Adelaide Street

Paper currency was a banking innovation in the era. It had been experimented with to fund the American Revolutionary War but had devalued badly, leading to general distrust of banknotes. Banknotes then were not legal tender, issued by a state bank. They were, rather, similar to cheques written by the bank promising to pay the bearer with "real" (usually metallic) money, or specie, if they returned the cheque to the bank. Any bank that could not redeem its banknotes with specie was forced to close for good.

The Bank of Upper Canada was able to lend out many more banknotes than it had the cash to redeem because Upper Canada was a specie-poor province, and the notes would pass from hand to hand to enable trade without ever being returned to the bank. On average, the bank lent out more than three times more banknotes than it could redeem; it made 6% interest on each note that it loaned out.

The bank's manager, Thomas Ridout, estimated that in the first three years of its operation, the bank's notes comprised between 74 and 77% of the province's money supply. Between 1823 and 1837, its profit on paid in capital ranged between 3.6% (1823) and 16.5% (1832) at a time when the maximum legal interest rate was 6%.

The Bank of Upper Canada suspended payments from March 5, 1838 to November 1, 1839 during the financial panic of that year. It was bankrupt, but a special act of legislature allowed it to continue operating without having to repay its loans with specie. The bank was a small operation, which, like many other early Canadian banks, collapsed in 1866.

=== The financial panic of 1836-8 ===
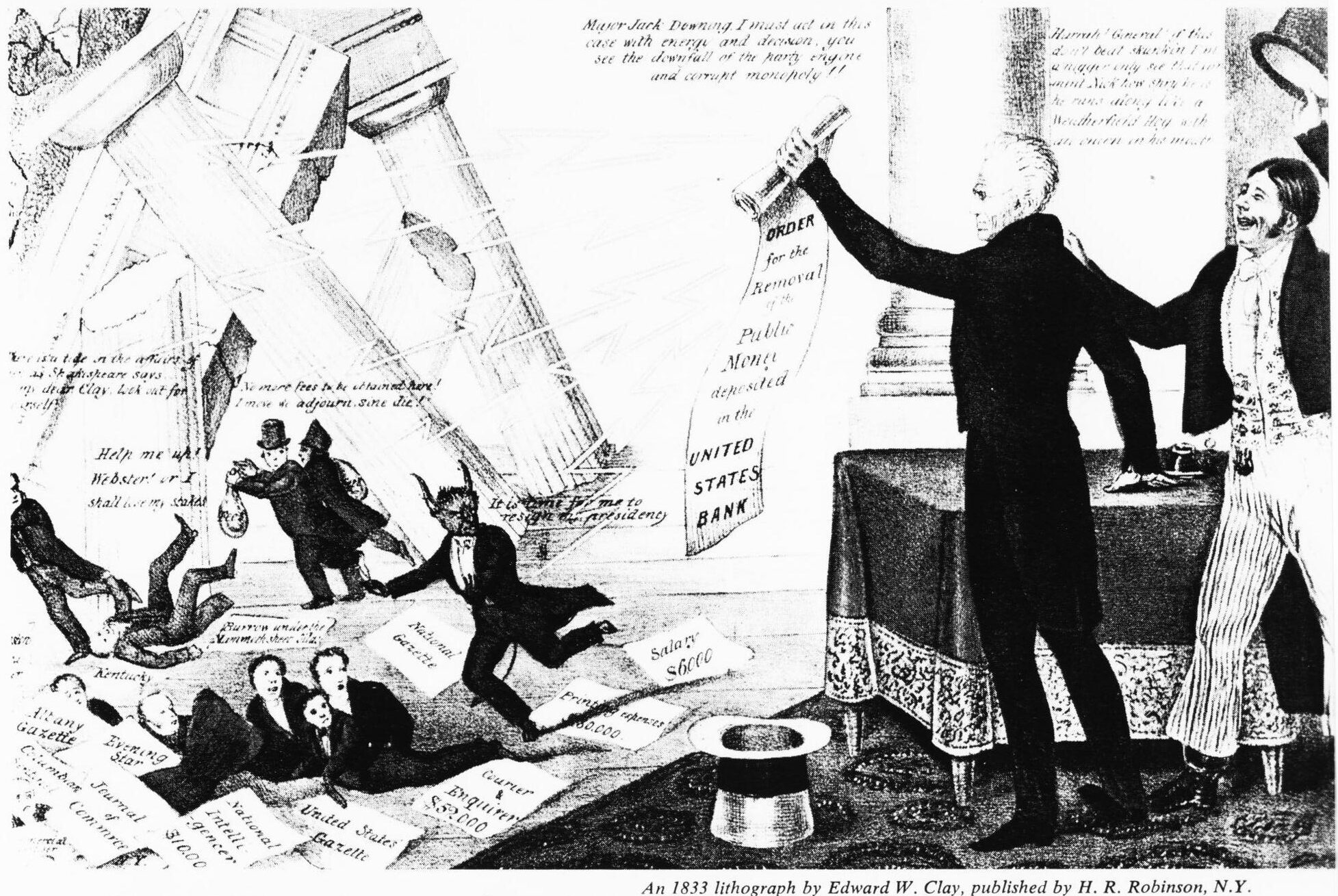
Democratic cartoon from 1833 showing Jackson destroying the Second Bank of the United States, to the approval of the Uncle Sam like figure to the right, and annoyance of the bank's president, shown as the Devil himself

On 10 July 1832, President Andrew Jackson vetoed the bill for the rechartering of the Second Bank of the United States, arguing that it was utilized by a "moneyed aristocracy" to oppress the common man. The same complaint was lodged by the Reformers against the Bank of Upper Canada, which served a similar role. The dismantling of the bank plunged the Anglo-American world into an enormous depression (1836-8) that was worsened by bad wheat harvests in Upper Canada in 1836. Farmers were unable to pay their debts. Most banks, including the Bank of Upper Canada,- suspended payments (i.e. declared bankruptcy) by July 1837 and requested government support. While the banks received government support, ordinary farmers and the poor did not.

=== Bank Wars (1835-1838) ===
The Bank of Upper Canada was the subject of almost continuous political attack. Shortly after its founding, Reform critic William Lyon Mackenzie published a series of articles on how speculative the Bank's loan practices were, and how close to bankruptcy it was. That resulted in an event, now known as the Types Riot, in 1826 in which the clique of Bank officers dubbed the Family Compact destroyed Mackenzie's printing press. Mackenzie, a bank critic, pushed for a non-speculative "hard money" policy where the bank loaned out only money that it actually had.

Until 1835, all banks in Upper Canada required a legislative charter. Reformers tried several legislative strategies to get their own bank, including attempts to incorporate credit unions such as the Farmers' Storehouse company. That came to an end in 1835 when Charles Duncombe produced a "Report on Currency" for the Legislative Assembly, which demonstrated the legality of the Scottish joint-stock bank system in Upper Canada.

The difference between the English chartered banks and the Scottish joint stock banks is that the Scottish banks were considered partnerships and hence didn't need a legislated Act in order to operate. The joint stock banks thus lacked limited liability, and every partner in the bank was responsible for the bank's debts to the full extent of their personal property. The chartered banks, in contrast, protected their shareholders with limited liability and hence from major loss; they thus encouraged speculation. The Scottish joint-stock banks followed a "hard money policy." They avoided speculative risk because if they failed, their shareholders were responsible for the full loss. Since the banks did not require a legislated charter, many more banks could be founded, and they were more competitive and freer from political influence and corruption.

Duncombe's report opened the gate for many new competitive banks to enter the market - just as the entire Anglo-American financial system was coming apart at the seams in a financial panic lasting until after the Rebellions of 1837. The Bank of Upper Canada survived only because of its influence on government.

=== The joint-stock banks ===
Following Duncombe's report, the Farmers' Bank and the Bank of the People were founded on a joint stock basis, until the Family Compact conspired to make new ones illegal in 1838.

=== The end of monopoly ===
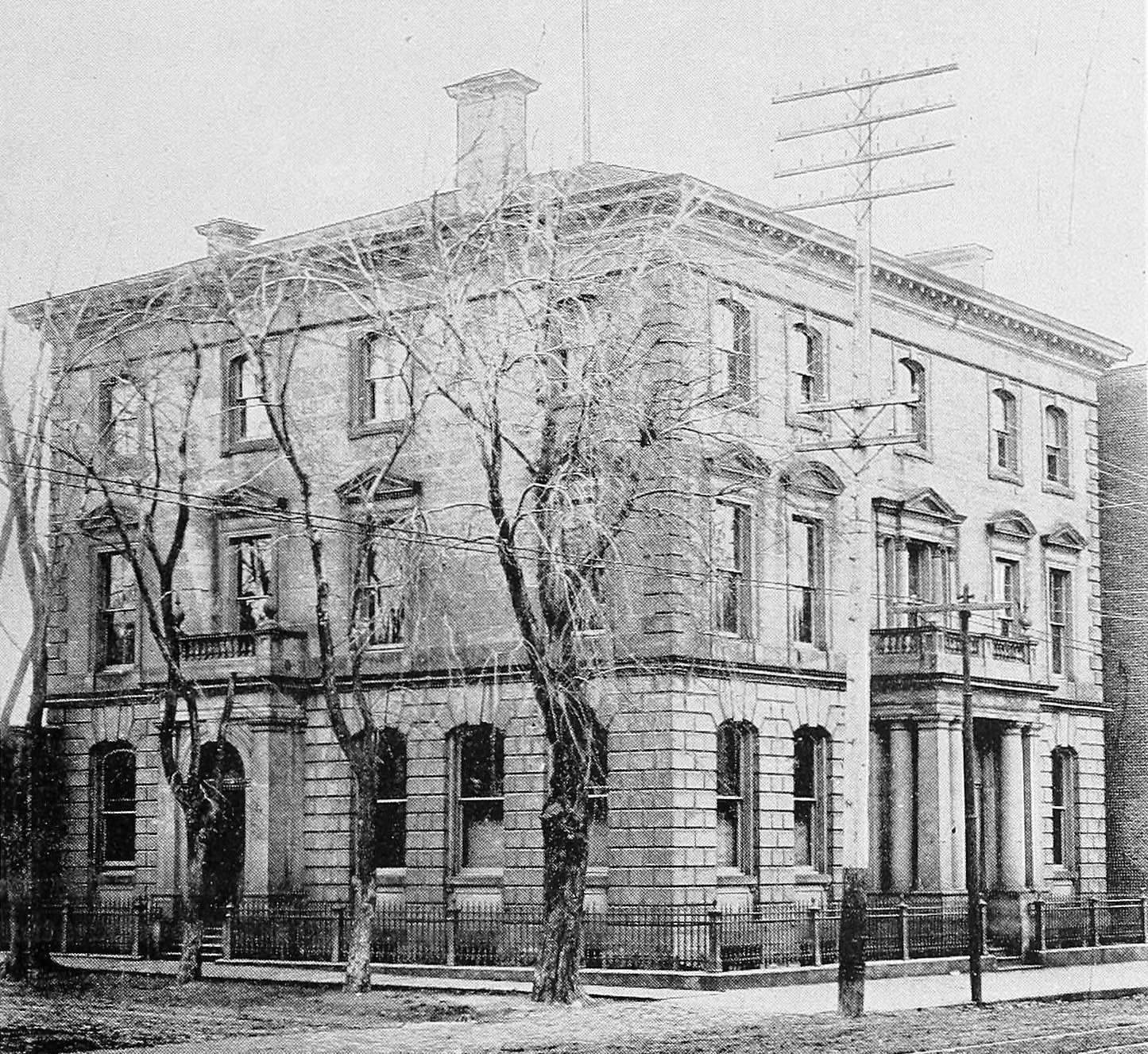
The Hamilton, Ontario branch of the bank at James and Vine. It was designed by Frederick James Rastrick in 1857.

The monopoly of the Bank of Upper Canada had been slowly eroding with the chartering of the Commercial Bank, and then the joint-stock banks. The Act to outlaw further joint-stock banks in 1838 again tilted towards monopoly. However, in 1841 the Bank of Montreal, long seeking an entry into Upper Canada, purchased the Bank of the People and quickly began to expand its branch network. The Bank of British North America also entered the provincial market around that time.

As a result, the Bank changed its strategy and in 1850 it became the official bank of the Province of Canada, collecting all government revenue and issuing all government cheques.

By 1863, the bank was struggling; in 1866 the Bank of Upper Canada closed its doors; the stockholders lost all of their investment of more than $3 million, and over $1 million in taxpayers money was also lost.

== Remaining buildings ==
The 1827 Bank of Upper Canada Building, its second headquarters (first home was a Georgian building from 1822 and demolished 1880s with current building (now Young People's Theatre) replacing it in 1887), still exists, located on Toronto's Adelaide St East. It has been designated a National Historic Site of Canada. Designed by architect William Warren Baldwin, 1825–27, the bank resembled a London townhouse with a Doric portico.

The Toronto building is on the Registry of Historical Places of Canada, along with two branches. The 86 John Street branch in Port Hope, Ontario, built in 1857 by Cumberland and Storm (last operated by Ontario Bank in 1881 and now Hotel Carlyle and Restaurant) and the 46 West Street branch in Goderich, Ontario, built in 1863 (now offices for Orr Insurance).

== Leadership ==
Presidents of the bank were:

1. William Allan, 1822–1824
2. George Crookshank, 1825
3. William Allan, 1826–1834
4. William Proudfoot, 1835–1860
5. George William Allan, 1861–1865

== Gallery ==
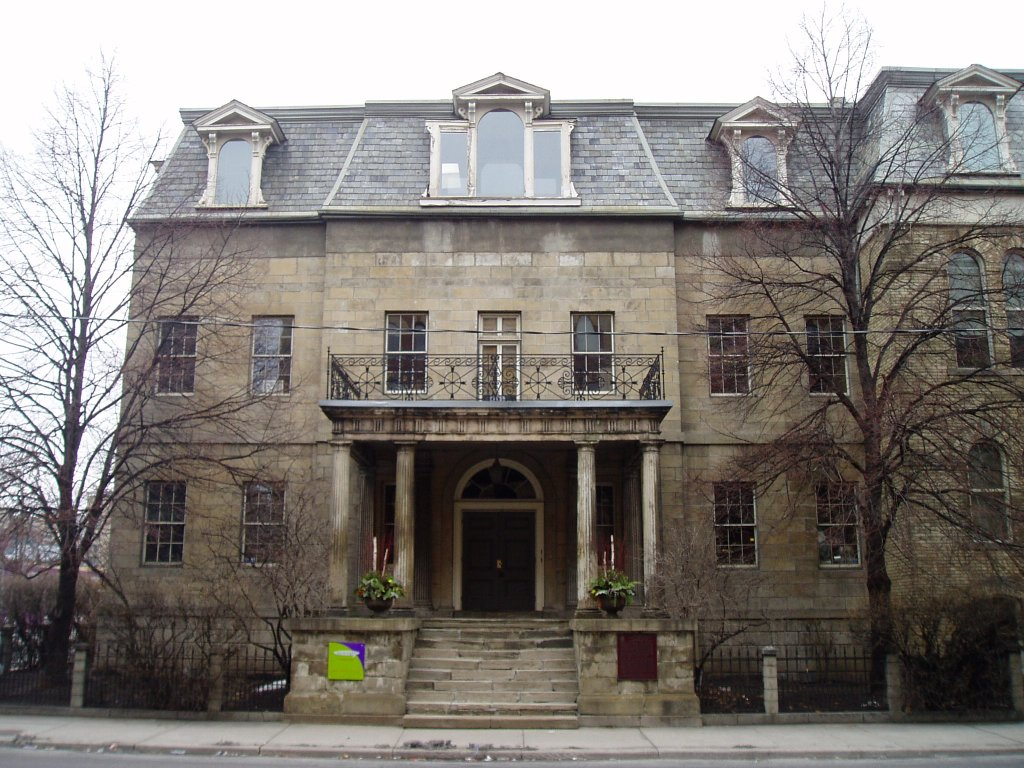
Bank of Upper Canada

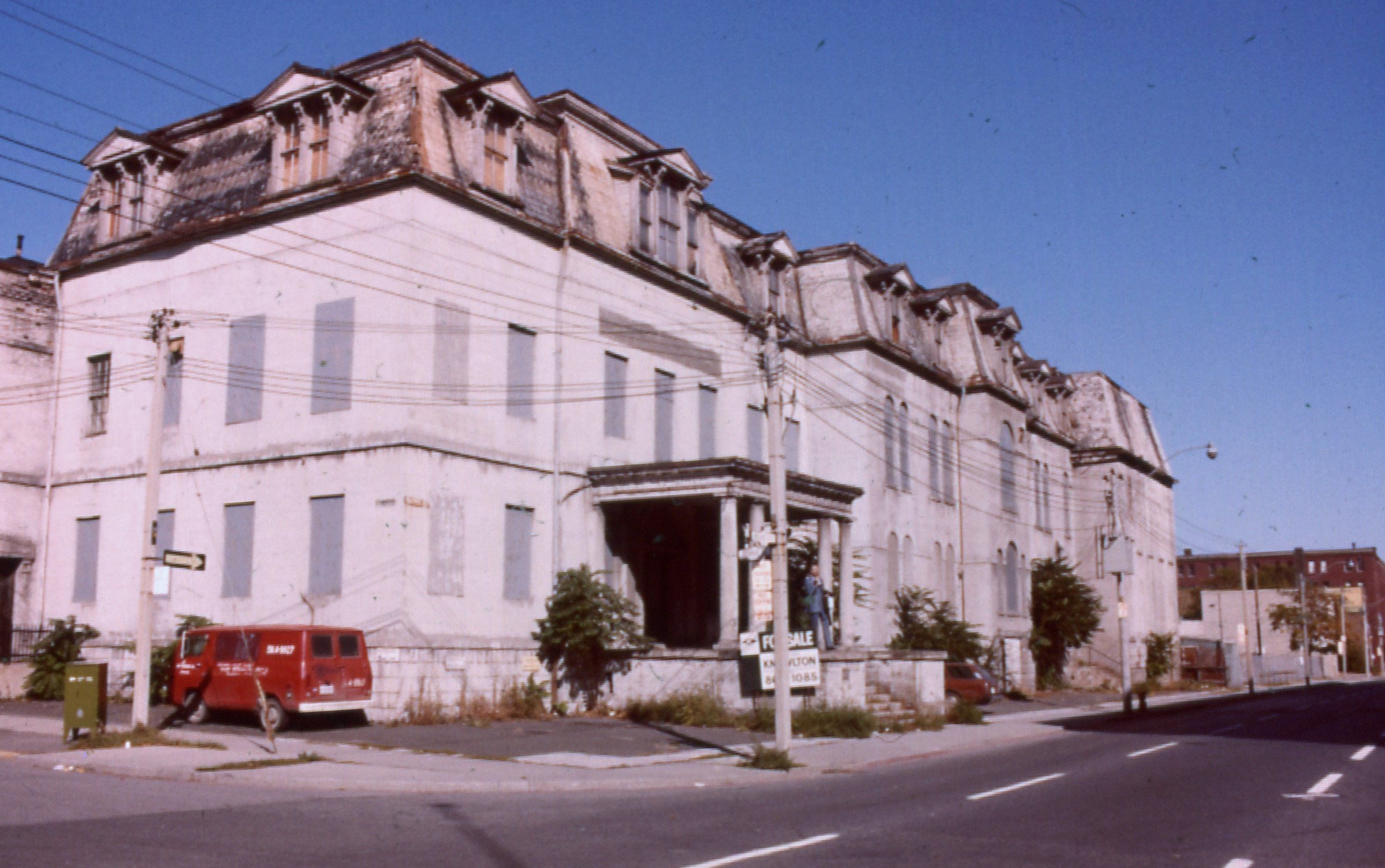
Bank of Upper Canada 1977 condition

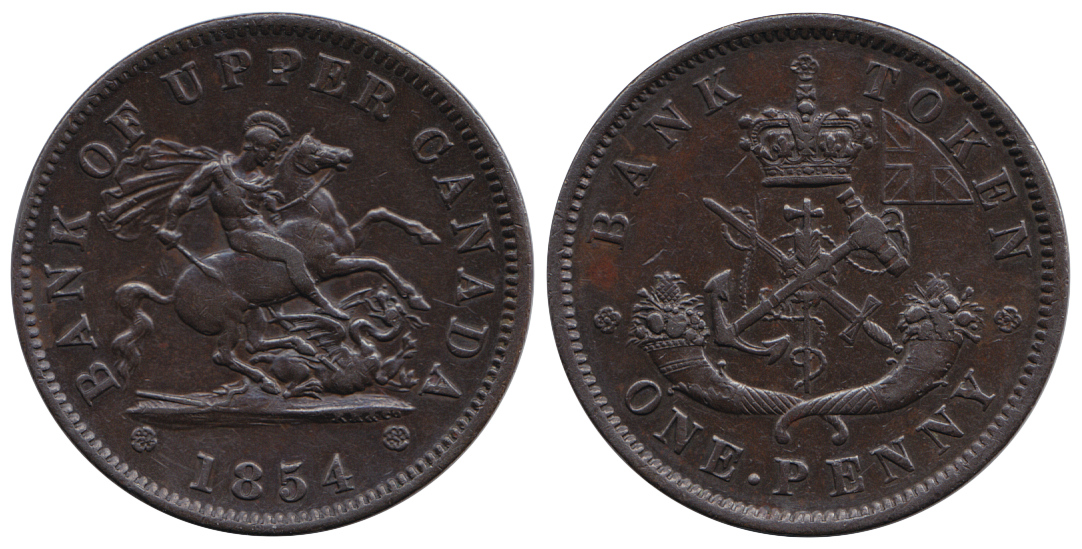
1 penny Token of the Bank of Upper Canada, 1854.
