= List of museums in Toronto =

There are a variety of different museums in Toronto. Types of museums located in Toronto include agricultural museums, art museums, fashion museums, food museums, history museums (including historic houses and living museums), military museums (including local regimental museums), railway museums, science museums, and textile museums.

== Current museums ==
The following is a list of museums current located in Toronto. The following list does not include virtual museums that do not have physical galleries, regardless if they're based in Toronto.

Name	Image	Neighborhood	Area (Note: Area refer to former lower-tier municipalities of Metropolitan Toronto. The lower-tier municipalities of Metropolitan Toronto were amalgamated to form the new City of Toronto in 1998, after the upper-tier government of Metropolitan Toronto was dissolved. The use of the term Old Toronto is a retronym used to refer to the pre-1998 lower-tier City of Toronto.)	Attendance	Type	Summary	Ref.
48th Highlanders Museum	Exterior front facade of St. Andrew's Presbyterian Church	Entertainment District	Old Toronto		Military (regimental)	Regimental museum for the 48th Highlanders of Canada. The museum has been located in St. Andrew's Church since 1997.	
A Space Gallery		Fashion District	Old Toronto		Art	Artist-run contemporary art gallery	
Aga Khan Museum	Exterior facade of the Aga Khan Museum	Don Mills	North York		Art	Muslim arts and culture	
Applewood Shaver Homestead		Eatonville	Etobicoke		Historic house	Historic house museum situated in a homestead dating back to c. 1850s	
Art Gallery of Ontario	Exterior front entrance facade of the Art Gallery of Ontario at dusk	Grange Park	Old Toronto	974,736 (2018)	Art	Gallery of Canadian and European art, with a collection that includes decorative arts, contemporary art, and sculptures. The museum also includes The Grange, a historic home used as an art space and lounge.	
Art Gallery of York University	Exterior view of the Accolade East Building at York University	York University Heights	North York		Art	Gallery of contemporary art. A university museum of York University, it is housed in the university's Accolade East Building.	
Art Museum at the University of Toronto	Exterior facade of the University of Toronto Art Centre at University College	University	Old Toronto	63,393 (2018)	Art	A university museum for contemporary art, comprising the adjacent Justina M. Barnicke Gallery at Hart House, and the University of Toronto Art Centre at University College. The two galleries were formerly separate entities before they were amalgamated into the Art Museum at the University of Toronto in 2014.	
Bata Shoe Museum	Exterior facade of the Bata Shoe Museum from across the intersection	University	Old Toronto	110,334 (2018)	Fashion	History of footwear from around the world	
Campbell House Museum	Front exterior facade of Campbell House Museum	Grange Park	Old Toronto		Historic house	Historic house museum that is situated in a house dating back to 1822. The building was converted into a historical house in 1974. The building also includes an art gallery.	
Canadian Language Museum	Front exterior facade of the Glendon Gallery building	Lawrence Park	Old Toronto		Language	Promotes the languages of Canada and the scientific study of languages. Situated within Glendon Gallery building of Glendon College, an English/French bilingual college of York University.	
Canadian Sculpture Centre		Church and Wellesley → Distillery District → North York	Old Toronto		Art	Contemporary Canadian sculpture gallery, operated by the Sculptors Society of Canada	
Casa Loma		Casa Loma	Old Toronto	350,000	Historic house	A historic house museum situated in an estate completed in 1914. The estate was converted into a historical house in 1937.	
Cedar Ridge Creative Centre		Woburn	Scarborough		Art	Art centre with exhibit gallery situated in a house dating back to the mid-19th century. The house was converted to an art centre in 1978.	
Colborne Lodge	Exterior back facade of Colborne Lodge	Swansea	Old Toronto		Historic house	Historic house museum situated in a building dating back to 1836, and reopened as a historic house in 1890. The museum is operated by the City of Toronto government	
Doris McCarthy Gallery	Interior entrance to the Doris McCarthy Gallery	Highland Creek	Scarborough		Art	A contemporary art gallery of the University of Toronto Scarborough	
Enoch Turner School	Exterior front entrance of the Enoch Turner School	Corktown	Old Toronto		Living	A living history museum of a Victorian-era period schoolhouse. The museum is housed in a schoolhouse dating back to 1848. The building was converted into a living history museum in 1970.	
Etobicoke Civic Centre Art Gallery	Exterior front entrance facade of the Etobicoke Civic Centre	Eatonville	Etobicoke		Art	The gallery is housed in the centre block of the Etobicoke Civic Centre.	
First Floor Gallery & Architecture and Design Gallery	Southern facade of 1 Spadina Crescent	University	Old Toronto		Art	The First Floor Gallery and the Architecture and Design Gallery are university art galleries managed by the University of Toronto's John H. Daniels Faculty of Architecture, Landscape and Design, and located in the Daniels Building. It features exhibitions of architecture, landscape architecture, urban design and allied design fields.	
Fort York	Birds-eye-view of Fort York	Fort York	Old Toronto		Military	Fort York was a defensive fortification, featuring buildings from the late 18th to early 19th century. Operated by City of Toronto government, it is presently used as a War of 1812 museum, featuring exhibits and historical re-enactments. The fort was reopened for public use by the city in 1934.	
Fourth York Post Office	Exterior facade of buildings on the north side of Adelaide Street. Two 19th century brick buildings to the left/west next to a 21st-century glass building.	Old Town	Old Toronto		History (postal)	Historic working post office and museum	
Gallery Arcturus		Garden District	Old Toronto		Art	Free, public contemporary art museum with rotating exhibits as well as workshops	
Gardiner Museum	Exterior front facade of the Gardiner Museum	University	Old Toronto		Art	Ceramic art	
Gibson House	Exterior facade of the Gibson House	Willowdale	North York		Historic house	The historic house museum is situated in a house dating back to 1851. The building was converted into a heritage house in 1971. The museum is operated by City of Toronto government.	
Hockey Hall of Fame	Exterior front entrance facade of the former Bank of Montreal/Hockey Hall of Fame building	Financial District	Old Toronto	256,754 (2017)	Sports	Ice hockey hall of fame	
The Image Centre	Exterior facade of The Image Centre at night, with blue and yellow lights illuminating the top portion of the building	Garden District	Old Toronto		Art	Operated by Toronto Metropolitan University, includes gallery spaces for photography, new media, installation art and film	
InterAccess		Dovercourt Park	Old Toronto		Art	Media arts	
Japanese Canadian Cultural Centre Gallery		Don Mills	North York		Art	The gallery at the Japanese Canadian Cultural Centre houses contemporary art with an East Asian perspective.	
Koffler Centre of the Arts	Interior of Artscape Youngplace, near the entrance of the Koffler Gallery	Trinity-Bellwoods	Old Toronto		Art	Contemporary arts centre housed in the Artscape Youngplace building	
Lakeshore Grounds Interpretive Centre		New Toronto	Etobicoke		Arts	Free exhibit and gallery spaces, workshops, and interpretive tours	
Mackenzie House	Exterior front facade of Mackenzie House	Garden District	Old Toronto		Historic house	Historic house museum built in 1830. The building was re-purposed into a heritage museum in 1936, and is operated by the City of Toronto government	
Market Gallery	Exterior north facade of St. Lawrence Market South	St. Lawrence	Old Toronto		Multiple	Changing exhibits of Toronto's history, art and culture, located inside St. Lawrence Market	
Mercer Union		Wallace Emerson	Old Toronto		Art	Artist-run contemporary art centre	
Montgomery's Inn	Exterior back facade of Montgomery's Inn	The Kingsway	Etobicoke		Historic house	Period historic inn situated in an inn completed in 1832. The museum is operated by the City of Toronto.	
Morris and Sally Justein Heritage Museum		Lawrence Manor	North York		Cultural/ethnic	Located in the Baycrest Centre for Geriatric Care, exhibits of Judaic heritage and culture	
Museum of Contemporary Art Toronto Canada	Exterior eastern facade of the Tower Automotive Building from the ground	Junction Triangle	Old Toronto	30,000 (2018)	Art	Also known as MOCA. Formerly known as the Museum of Contemporary Canadian Art.	
Museum of Toronto	Exterior view of the Museum building	401 building	Downtown Toronto		History	Also known as MTO. Formerly known as the Myseum.	
MZTV Museum of Television	Exterior view of the MZTV Museum building	Liberty Village	Old Toronto		Media	Historic television sets and memorabilia	
Neilson Park Creative Centre		Markland Wood	Etobicoke		Art	Includes two galleries for exhibits of contemporary fine arts and crafts	
OCAD University Galleries	People looking at artwork inside the OCAD University Graduate Student Gallery	Grange Park	Old Toronto		Art	Art galleries managed by the OCAD University art school, includes its Graduate Student Gallery	
Ontario Science Centre	Aerial view of the Ontario Science Centre from the northeast	Flemingdon Park	North York	900,225 (2018)	Science	Themes include geology, nature, astronomy, music, technology, anatomy, communications	
Open Studio Contemporary Printmaking Centre		Fashion District	Old Toronto		Art	Artist-run printmaking centre	
Osborne Collection of Early Children's Books	Exterior main entrance to the Toronto Public Library's Lillian H. Smith branch	Grange Park	Old Toronto		Literature	Located in the Lillian H. Smith branch of the Toronto Public Library, changing exhibits of books, art, documents and more from the collection	
Power Plant	Exterior of The Power Plant	Harbourfront	Old Toronto	77,243 (2018)	Art	Contemporary art gallery	
Queen's Own Rifles of Canada Regimental Museum	Interior view of the exhibits at the Queen's Own Rifles of Canada Regimental Museum	Casa Loma	Old Toronto		Military (regimental)	Regimental museum of The Queen's Own Rifles of Canada, located on the third floor of Casa Loma	
Redpath Sugar Museum	View of Redpath Sugar Refinery from Lake Ontario	Harbourfront	Old Toronto		Food	Sugar manufacture and industry in Canada, located at the Redpath Sugar Refinery	
Reuben & Helene Dennis Museum		Humewood–Cedarvale	York		Cultural/ethnic	Located in Beth Tzedec Synagogue, it contains Jewish art, ceremonial objects and history.	
Riverdale Farm	View of a wind wheel near two 19th century wooden structures at Riverdale Farm	Cabbagetown	Old Toronto		Agricultural/historic farm	Working heritage farm with an 1860s to 1920s Ontario focus	
Royal Canadian Military Institute Museum	Exterior east/front facade of the Royal Canadian Military Institute	Grange Park	Old Toronto		Military	Features guns, swords, spears, other weapons from around the world, badges, uniforms, medals, art, miniatures, photographs and other military memorabilia. Located at the Royal Canadian Military Institute.	
Royal Ontario Museum	Exterior facade of the Royal Ontario Museum from across the intersection of Bloor Street and Avenue Road	University	Old Toronto	1,440,000 (2018)	Multiple	Includes dinosaurs, Near Eastern and African art, East Asian art, European history, and Canadian history	
Royal Regiment of Canada Museum	View of a steel black-coloured archway with the words Fort York Armoury written in the centre of the arc. The exterior of the armoury is visible in the background	Fort York	Old Toronto		Military (regimental)	Regimental museum covering the history of The Royal Regiment of Canada, located in the Fort York Armoury	
Saint Mark's Coptic Museum		Steeles	Scarborough		Art	Coptic and Christian art, icons, coins, crosses, manuscripts, pottery, woodwork	
Scarborough Museum	Exterior facade of Cornell House, with other buildings of the Scarborough Museum in the background	Bendale	Scarborough		Historic houses	Local history, 1910s period house, mid-19th century log house, carriage works, operated by the City of Toronto government	
Spadina House	Exterior back/east facade of the Spadina House	Casa Loma	Old Toronto		Historic house	Historic mansion reflecting four generations and periods, operated by the City of Toronto government	
Taras Shevchenko Museum	Façade of the Shevchenko Museum on Bloor St	High Park North	Old Toronto		Biographical	Life and works of Ukrainian poet Taras Shevchenko	
TD Gallery at the Toronto Reference Library	Exterior front/southwest entrance facade of Toronto Reference Library	Yorkville	Old Toronto		Literature	Changing exhibits from its collections in the TD Gallery. Located in the Toronto Reference Library.	
Textile Museum of Canada	Bricked exterior facade of the main entrance to the Textile Museum of Canada	Discovery District	Old Toronto	29,190 (2018)	Textile	Includes fabrics, ceremonial cloths, garments, carpets, quilts and related artifacts	
Thomas Fisher Rare Book Library	Interior view of the mezzanine from several storeys above the first floor, at the Thomas Fisdher Rare Book Library	University	Old Toronto		Literature	Changing exhibits of books, art, documents and other literary works from its collections	
Todmorden Mills	View of a red-brick path, with a red-bricked mill that has chimney stack built in its centre to the side of the path	Old East York	East York		Multiple	Includes local history and industry museum, art gallery, theatre, operated by the City of Toronto government	
Tollkeeper's Cottage Museum	Exterior view of a white wooden building from the 19th century	Wychwood Park	Old Toronto		Historic house	1800s heritage museum, an example of tollkeeper's cottages in Ontario during the 19th century	
Toronto Dominion Gallery of Inuit Art		Financial District	Old Toronto		Art	Located in the Toronto-Dominion Centre, collection of Inuit art, a cooperative project of Cadillac Fairview and the Toronto-Dominion Bank	
Toronto Holocaust Museum	Toronto Holocaust Museum	Bathurst Street	North York		History	A space for education and dialogue about the Holocaust and its ongoing relevance	
Toronto Police Museum and Discovery Centre		Discovery District	Old Toronto		History (law enforcement)	Museum on the history of the Toronto Police Service. The museum is located at the Toronto Police Headquarters.	
Toronto Railway Museum		CityPlace	Old Toronto		Railway	Located at Roundhouse Park	
Toronto Scottish Regiment Museum		New Toronto	Etobicoke		Military (regimental)	Regimental museum covering the history of The Toronto Scottish Regiment (Queen Elizabeth The Queen Mother's Own)	
Toronto Sculpture Garden	A grass field with brick pathway lining the side of it. A waterfall and green wall is visible in the background	St. Lawrence	Old Toronto		Art	Small park with changing sculpture exhibits	
Ukrainian Museum of Canada, Ontario Branch	A volunteer woman explains about traditional Ukrainian embroidery in the Ukrainian Museum of Canada, Ontario Branch, 2023.	Harbord Village	Old Toronto		Cultural/ethnic	Located in the St. Volodymyr Institute, Ukrainian art, folk art, clothing, jewelry, religious objects, heritage and culture	
The Village at Black Creek	View of several heritage buildings at Black Creek Pioneer Village	York University Heights	North York	141,000 (2017)	Living	A living history museum situated in North York. The property contains a number of early- to mid-19th-century buildings.	
Zion Schoolhouse	Exterior facade of the Zion Schoolhouse	Don Valley Village	North York		Living	A living history museum for education, situated in a one-room schoolhouse built in 1869 (period restorations c. 1910). Operated by the City of Toronto Cultural Services.	

=== Non-permanent museums ===
Myseum of Toronto is a "pop-up" museum that provides exhibitions throughout the Greater Toronto Area, and does not have a physical location. It celebrates the evolution of local communities, cultures, and urban and natural spaces of Toronto.

Theatre Museum Canada hosts travelling exhibits in various venues in Toronto. Its administrative offices are located in Toronto. In 2011, the museum announced it would move into a permanent facility at 355 King Street West. The museum would be situated inside the King Blue condominium development in the Entertainment District.

== Former museums ==
=== Relocated ===
The following table includes museums whose facilities were formerly located in Toronto, although have since moved beyond the city limits.

Name	Image	Type	Year opened	Year closed in Toronto	New location	Summary
Canada's Sports Hall of Fame		Sports	1955	2006	Calgary, Alberta	The Canadian hall of fame and museum was located at Exhibition Place from 1955 to 2006. It was situated in the former officers' quarters of New Fort York (pictured) from 1955 to 1957, the Press Building from 1957 to 1961, and the Hall of Fame building from 1961 to 2006. The hall of fame museum was closed in 2006 to make way for BMO Field. The organization reopened its hall of fame museum in Calgary in 2011.
Canadian Air and Space Museum		Aviation	1997	2011	Springwater, Ontario	The museum's collection was put in storage in 2011, after the closure of its facility in Downsview Park. The museum's office is presently based in Mississauga-based offices of the Greater Toronto Airports Authority. In 2019, a permanent home for the museum was found at Edenvale Airport in Springwater, Ontario. The museum will be renamed the Canadian Air and Space Conservancy upon its reopening.

=== Defunct ===
The following list includes former museums in Toronto that have closed.

Name	Image	Type	Opened	Closed	Summary
Canada's Design Museum	The former Toronto Stock Exchange building	Design	2012	2019	Housed within the original Toronto Stock Exchange building, the museum was operated by Design Exchange.
Canadian Motorsport Hall of Fame Museum		Sports			The temporary home for the museum for the Canadian Motorsport Hall of Fame was situated at Downsview Park.
CBC Museum	Entrance to the CBC Museum	Media	1994 (Note: The collection was started in 1960.)	2017	Located in the Canadian Broadcasting Centre
Children's Own Museum		Children's	1997	2002 (Note: Physical museum closed in 2002. Its collection remains in storage.)	Originally opened as a temporary exhibit at the Harbourfront Centre, it was relocated to the McLaughlin Planetarium in 1998.
McLaughlin Planetarium	McLaughlin Planetarium in 2008	Planetarium	1968	1995	The building was closed in 1995, and was sold to the University of Toronto in 2009. The university has announced plans to demolish the structure to make way for additional facilities.
Museum of Inuit Art		Art	2007	2016	Located within Queen's Quay Terminal. Not to be confused with the Toronto Dominion Gallery of Inuit Art (see table on current museums).
Parliament Interpretive Centre		Military	2012	2015	Built atop the First Parliament Building of Upper Canada. The museum was opened from 2012 to 2015 as a part of War of 1812 bicentennial celebrations, and focused on the settlement of York during the war.
Olympic Spirit Toronto		Sports	2004	2006	An Olympics-themed sports museum. It was located in 35 Dundas Street East. Its building is presently used as the television studios for Rogers Communications' Citytv and Omni Television.
Toronto Free Gallery		Art	2004		Non-profit activist gallery. Opened in 2004, and relocated in 2008.
Toronto Maritime Museum		Maritime	1958	2008	Established as the Marine Museum of Upper Canada, it was located at Stanley Barracks, it moved to a building at Queens Quay in 1999, before closing in 2008.

== See also ==
- List of museums in Canada
- List of museums in Ontario
