= Downtown Toronto =

City centre in Ontario, Canada

- City centre
- Aerial view of downtown Toronto in 2026
- Interactive map of Downtown Toronto
- Coordinates: 43°39′N 79°23′W
- Country: Canada
- Province: Ontario
- City: Toronto

Government
  - MPs: Evan Solomon (L); Chi Nguyen (L); Danielle Martin (L)
  - MPPs: Chris Glover (NDP); Jessica Bell (NDP); Kristyn Wong-Tam (NDP)

Area
  - Total: 16.6 km^{2} (6.4 sq mi)

Population (2021)
  - Total: 275,931
  - Density: 16,608/km^{2} (43,010/sq mi)
- Time zone: UTC-5 (EST)
  - Summer (DST): UTC-4 (EDT)

Downtown Toronto is the city centre of Toronto, Ontario, Canada. As defined by Statistics Canada, it is bounded by Bloor Street to the northeast, a Canadian Pacific Railway line to the northwest, Lake Ontario to the south, the Don Valley to the east, and Bathurst Street to the west, with an area of approximately 16.6 square kilometres (6.4 sq mi). It is located entirely within the boundaries of Old Toronto. It is the location of the offices of municipal government of Toronto and the Government of Ontario.

The area showcases Canada's largest concentration of skyscrapers and businesses that form Toronto's skyline. Downtown Toronto has the second-most skyscrapers exceeding 200 metres (656 ft) in height of any commercial hub in North America, behind only Midtown Manhattan, New York City.

== Neighbourhoods ==
The retail core of the downtown is located along Yonge Street from Queen Street to College Street. The large cluster of retail centres and shops in the area includes the Toronto Eaton Centre indoor mall, with an estimated 600 retail stores, 150 bars and restaurants, and 7 hotels. In recent years the area has been experiencing a renaissance as the Business Improvement Area (BIA) has brought in new retail establishments while updating standards for cleanliness. The area has also seen the opening of the Sankofa Square public square, a public space for performances and art displays, including live theatres, a movie complex at Sankofa Square and the historic Massey Hall. Historical sites and landmarks include the Arts & Letters Club, the Church of the Holy Trinity, Mackenzie House, Maple Leaf Gardens, Old City Hall, and the Toronto Police Museum and Discovery Centre.

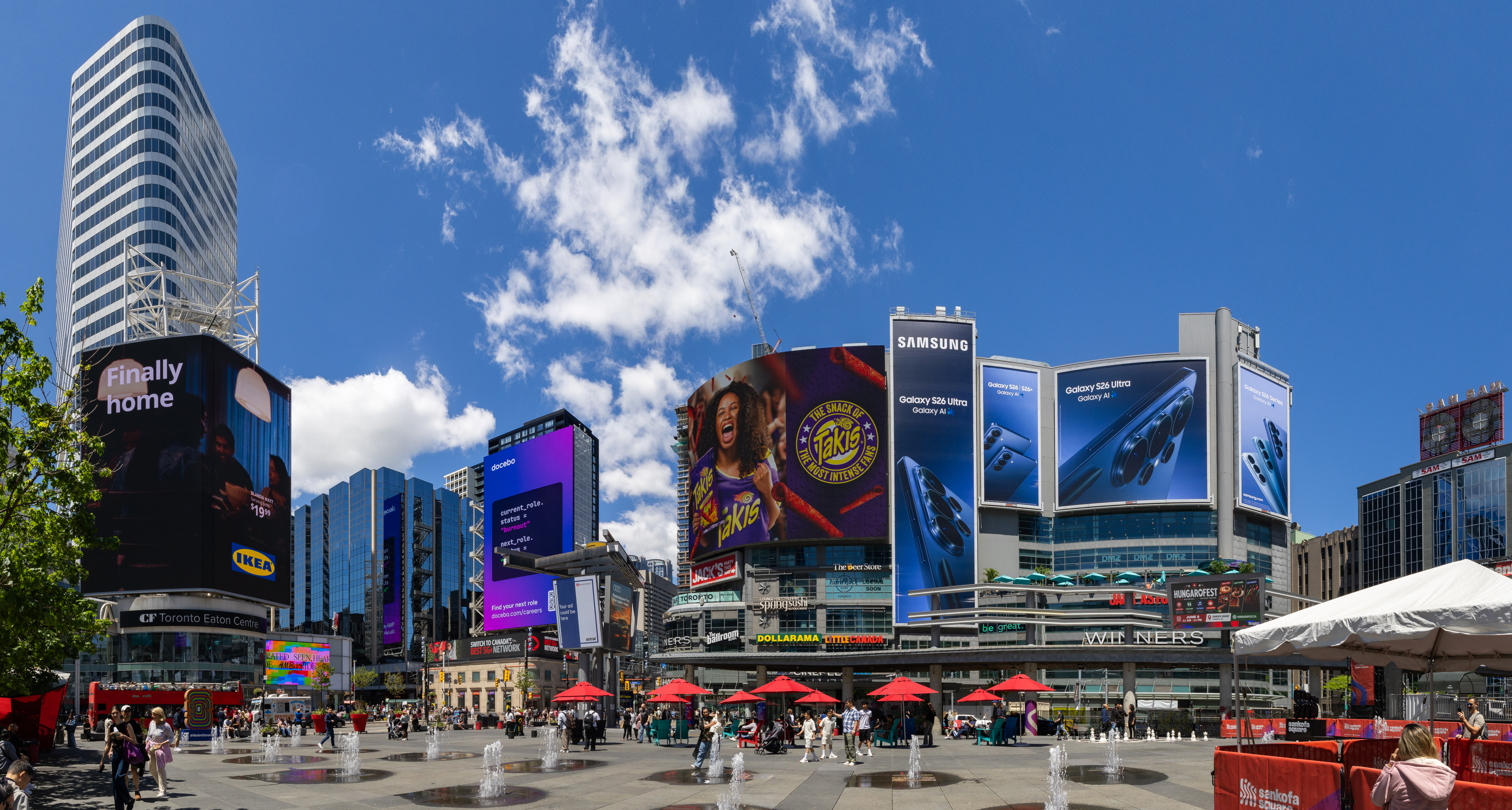
Sankofa Square, Toronto's landmark public square at the intersection of Yonge Street and Dundas Street East.

The Financial District, centred on the intersection of Bay Street and King Street is the centre of Canada's financial industry. It contains the Toronto Stock Exchange, which is the largest in Canada and tenth in the world by market capitalization as of 2021. The construction of skyscrapers in downtown Toronto had rapidly increased since the 1960s.

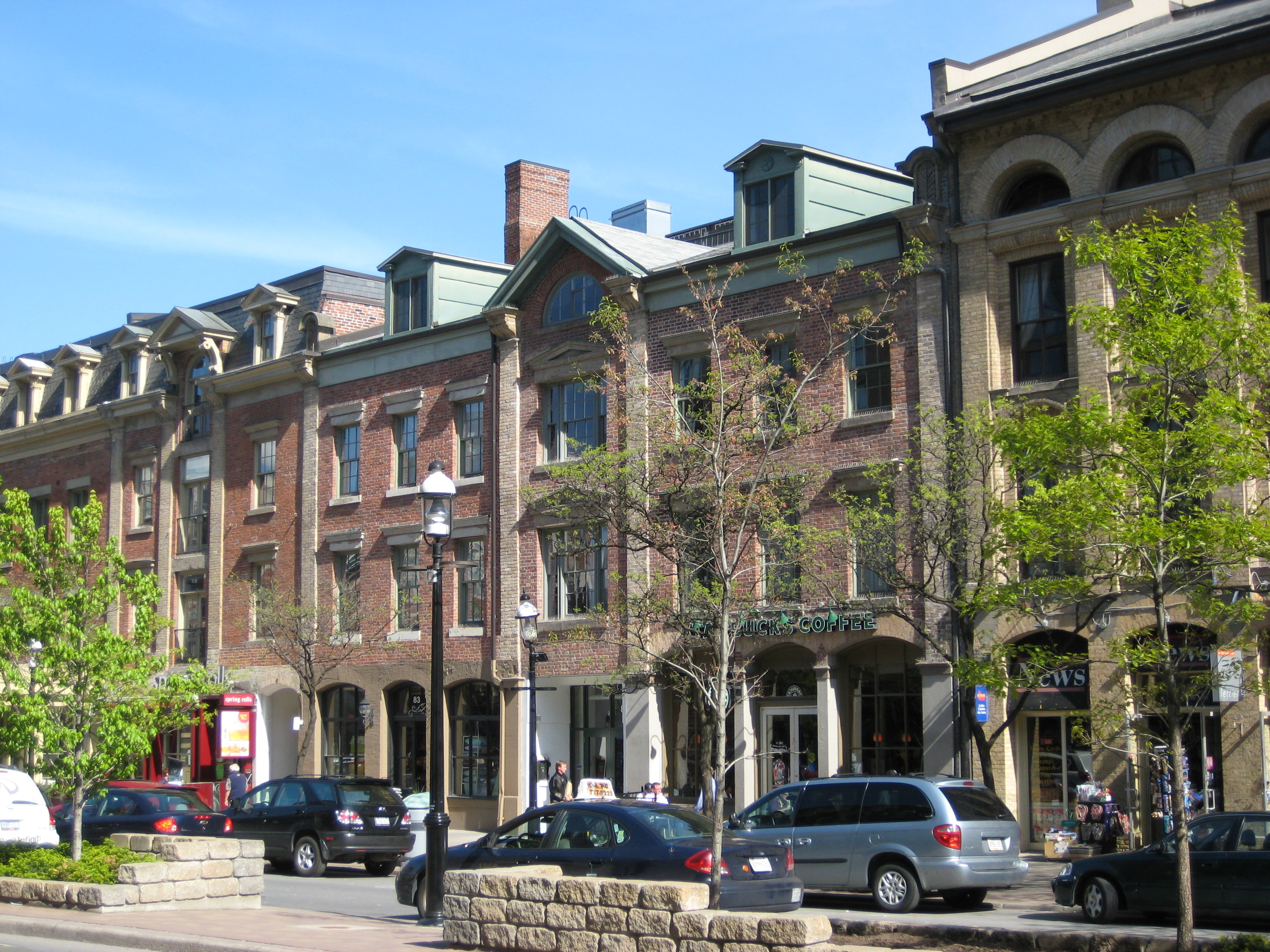
Located within the Old Town, St. Lawrence is one of several historic districts in downtown Toronto.

The area of St. Lawrence to the east of the financial district is one of the oldest areas of Toronto, featuring heritage buildings, theatres, music, dining and a variety of pubs. This community of distinct downtown neighbourhoods includes the site of the original Town of York, which was Toronto's first neighbourhood, dating back to 1793. The area boasts one of the largest concentrations of 19th-century buildings in Ontario. Of particular note are St. Lawrence Hall, St. James' Cathedral, St. Michael's Cathedral, St. Paul's Basilica, the Enoch Turner School House, the Bank of Upper Canada, Le Royal Meridien King Edward Hotel, and the Gooderham Building, and on Saturday there is a farmers' market. Other historical districts in downtown Toronto include Cabbagetown, Corktown, the Distillery District, and Old Town.

To the west of the financial district is the Entertainment District, home to hundreds of restaurants, nightclubs, sporting facilities, boutiques, hotels, attractions, and live theatre. That district was formerly an industrial area and was redeveloped for entertainment purposes in the early 1980s, becoming a major centre for entertainment. The redevelopment started with the Mirvish family refurbishing the Royal Alexandra Theatre and their construction of the Princess of Wales Theatre. The area is now the site of Roy Thomson Hall and the Canadian Broadcasting Centre.

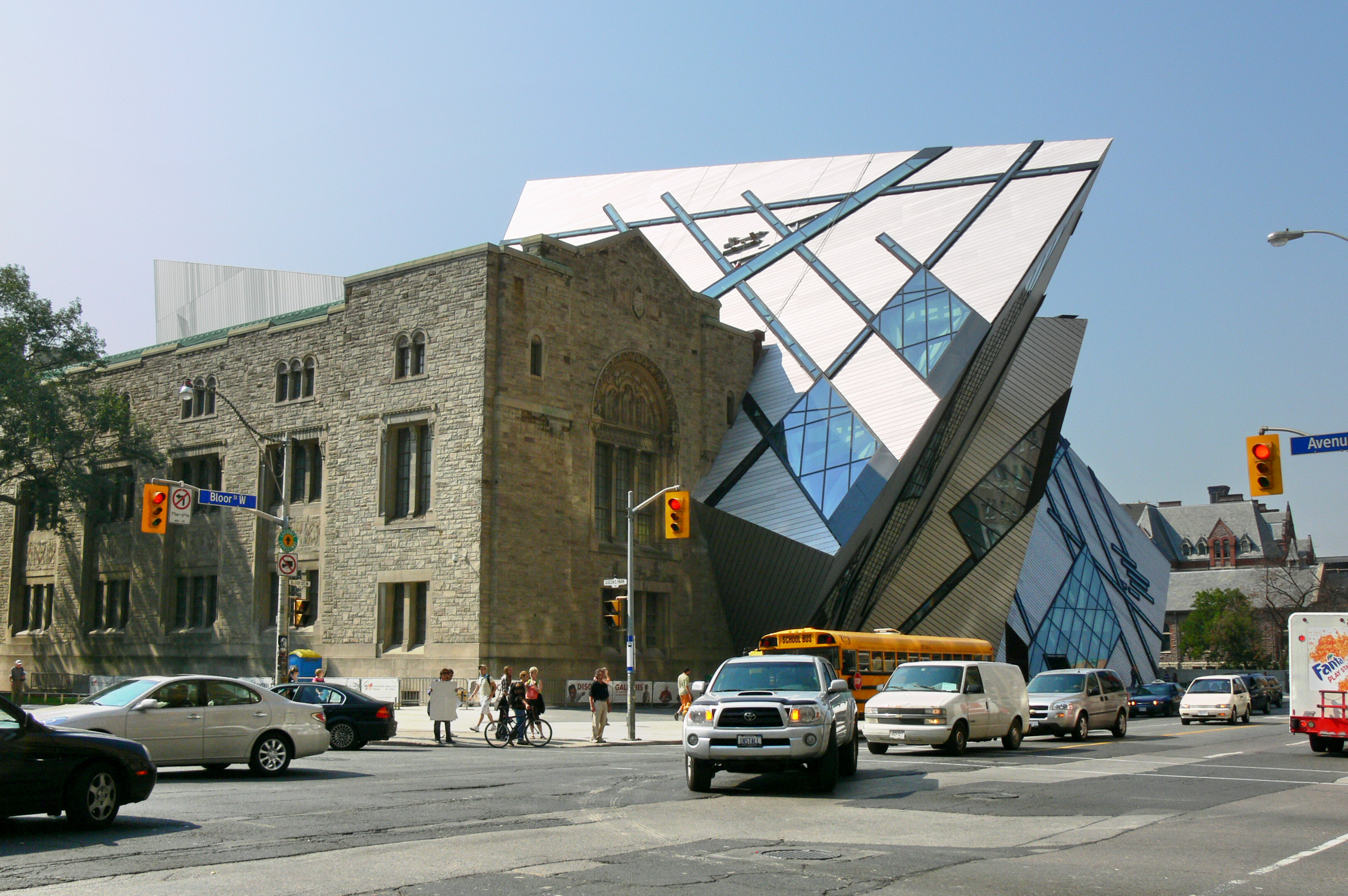
The Royal Ontario Museum is a museum of art, world culture and natural history, located in the upscale Yorkville district.

The Yorkville area, to the north of Bloor Street and the Mink Mile, are more than 700 designer boutiques, spas, restaurants, hotels, and world-class galleries. It was a former village in its own right (prior to 1883) and since the early 1970s has developed into an up-scale shopping district. Where Bloor and Yonge Streets cross the city's subway lines, is one of the busiest intersections in the city. At Avenue Road and Bloor Street is the Royal Ontario Museum, the largest museum in the city, with a diverse anthropological and natural history collection.

The Harbourfront area to the south was formerly an industrial and railway lands area. Since the 1970s, it has seen extensive redevelopment, including the building of the Rogers Centre stadium, numerous condominiums and the Harbourfront Centre waterfront revitalization. The area to the east of Yonge Street is still in transition, with the conversion of industrial lands to mixed residential and commercial uses planned.

Among the important government headquarters in downtown Toronto include the Ontario Legislature, and the Toronto City Hall.

=== List of neighbourhoods ===
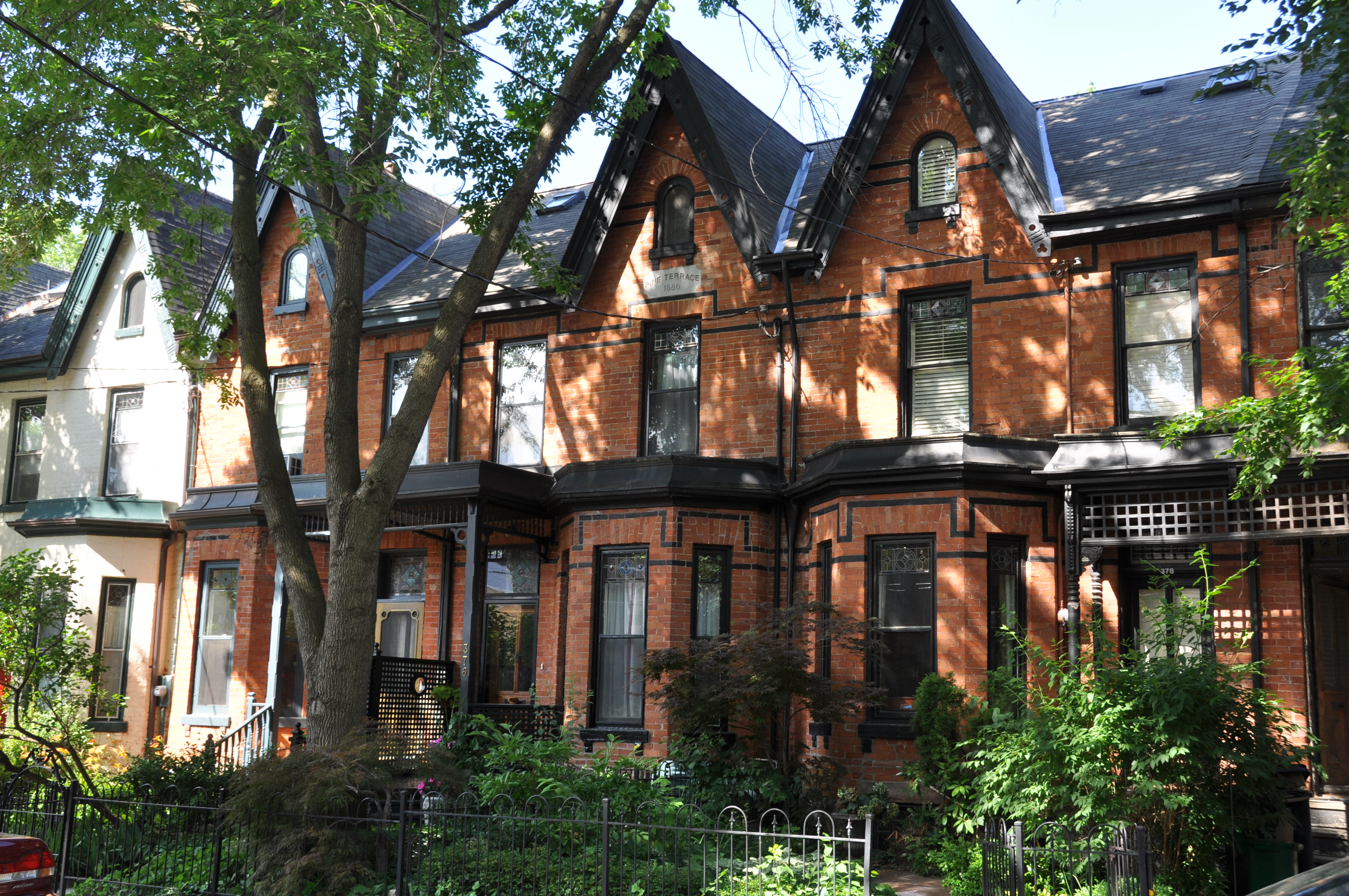
Bay-and-gable style residences in Cabbagetown

- Alexandra Park
- The Annex
- Cabbagetown
- Chinatown
- Church and Wellesley
- CityPlace
- Corktown
- Discovery District
- Distillery District
- East Bayfront
- Entertainment District
- Fashion District
- Financial District
- Garden District
- Grange Park
- Harbord Village
- Harbourfront
- Kensington Market
- Moss Park
- Old Town
- Quayside
- Regent Park
- South Core
- St. James Town
- St. Lawrence
- Trefann Court
- University
- Yorkville (Note: This neighbourhood includes areas outside the boundaries of downtown Toronto.)

== Architecture ==
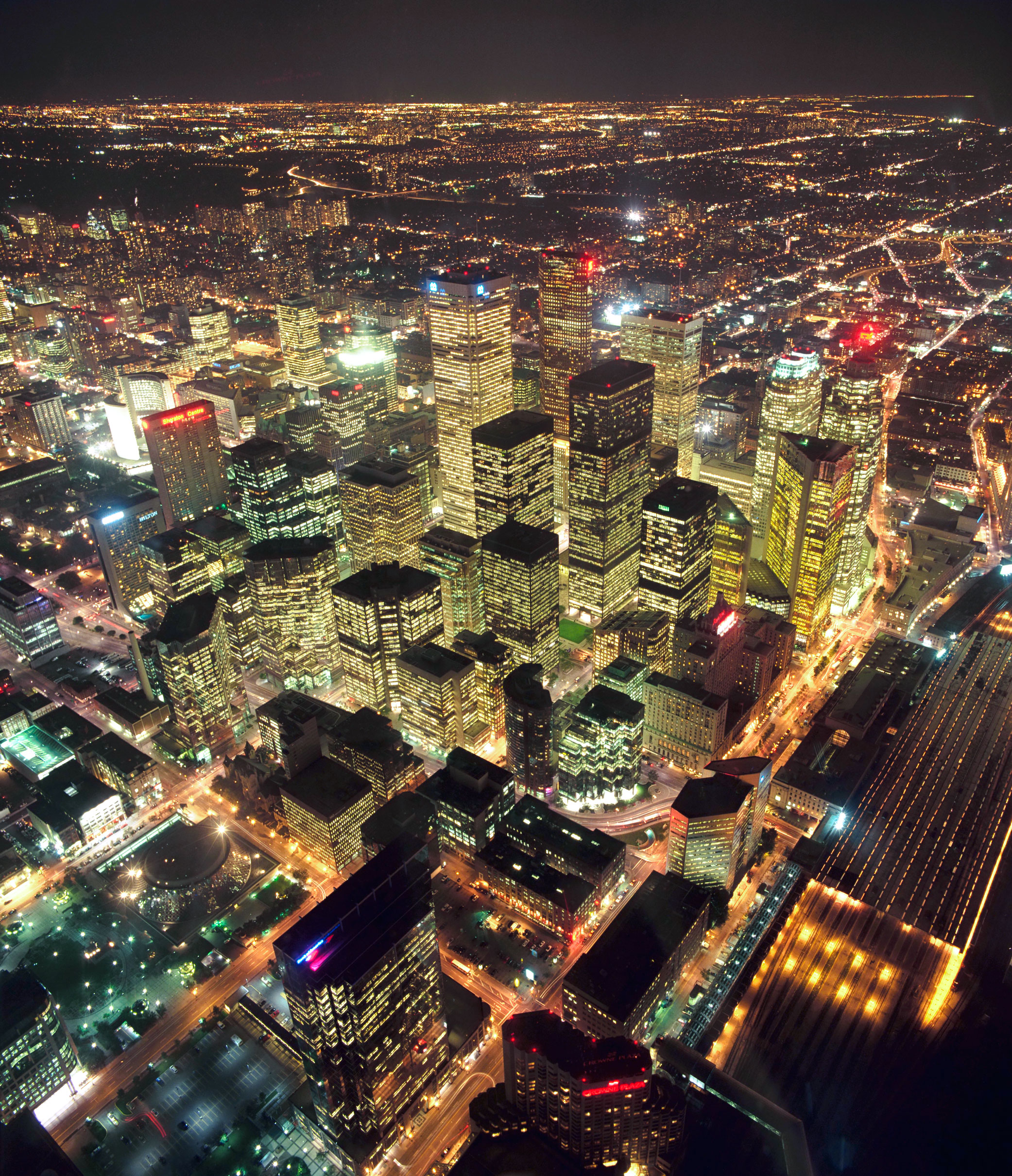
Since 2022 downtown Toronto has been home to the second highest number of skyscrapers in North America just behind Midtown Manhattan.

In the 1970s, Toronto experienced major economic growth and surpassed Montreal to become the largest city in Canada. Many international and domestic businesses relocated to Toronto and created massive new skyscrapers downtown. All of Canada's Big Five banks constructed skyscrapers beginning in the late 1960s through the early 1990s.

Downtown Toronto contains dozens of notable skyscrapers. The area's First Canadian Place is the tallest building in Canada at a height of 298 metres (978 feet). The CN Tower, once the tallest free-standing structure in the world, remains the tallest such structure in the Americas, standing at 553.33 metres (1,815 ft., 5 inches). Other notable buildings include Scotia Plaza, TD Centre, Commerce Court, the Royal Bank Plaza, The Bay's flagship store, and the Fairmont Royal York Hotel.

Since 2007, urban consolidation has been centred in downtown Toronto and as a result has been undergoing Manhattanization with the construction of new office towers, hotels and condos.

== Demographics ==
In 2016, the population of downtown Toronto was 237,698 with 503,575 jobs located within that area. The population density was 143 people per hectare, and the job density was 303 jobs per hectare.

=== Landmarks ===
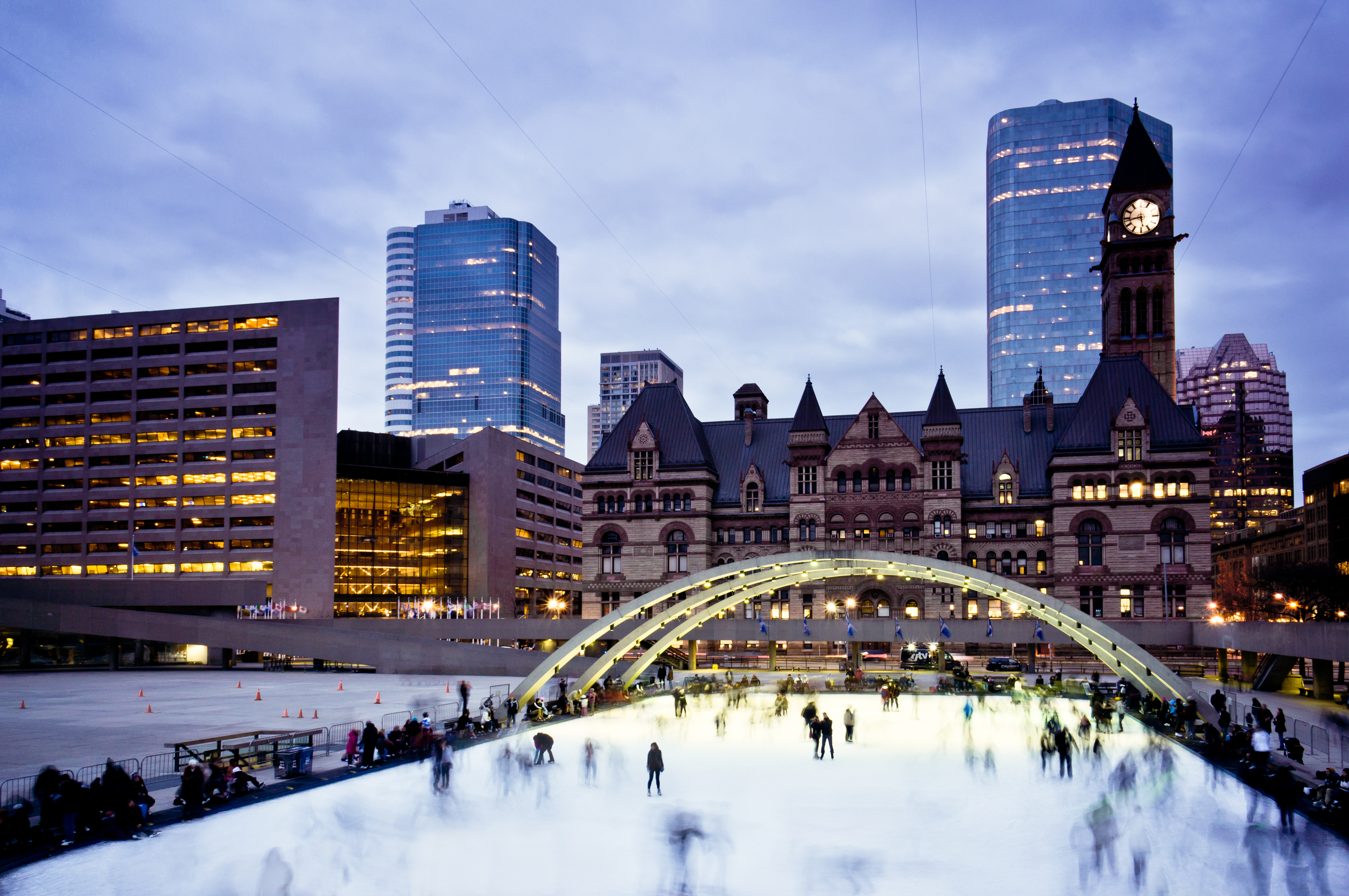
Nathan Phillips Square is a public square and landmark in downtown Toronto. Old City Hall, another landmark in the area, is visible in the background.

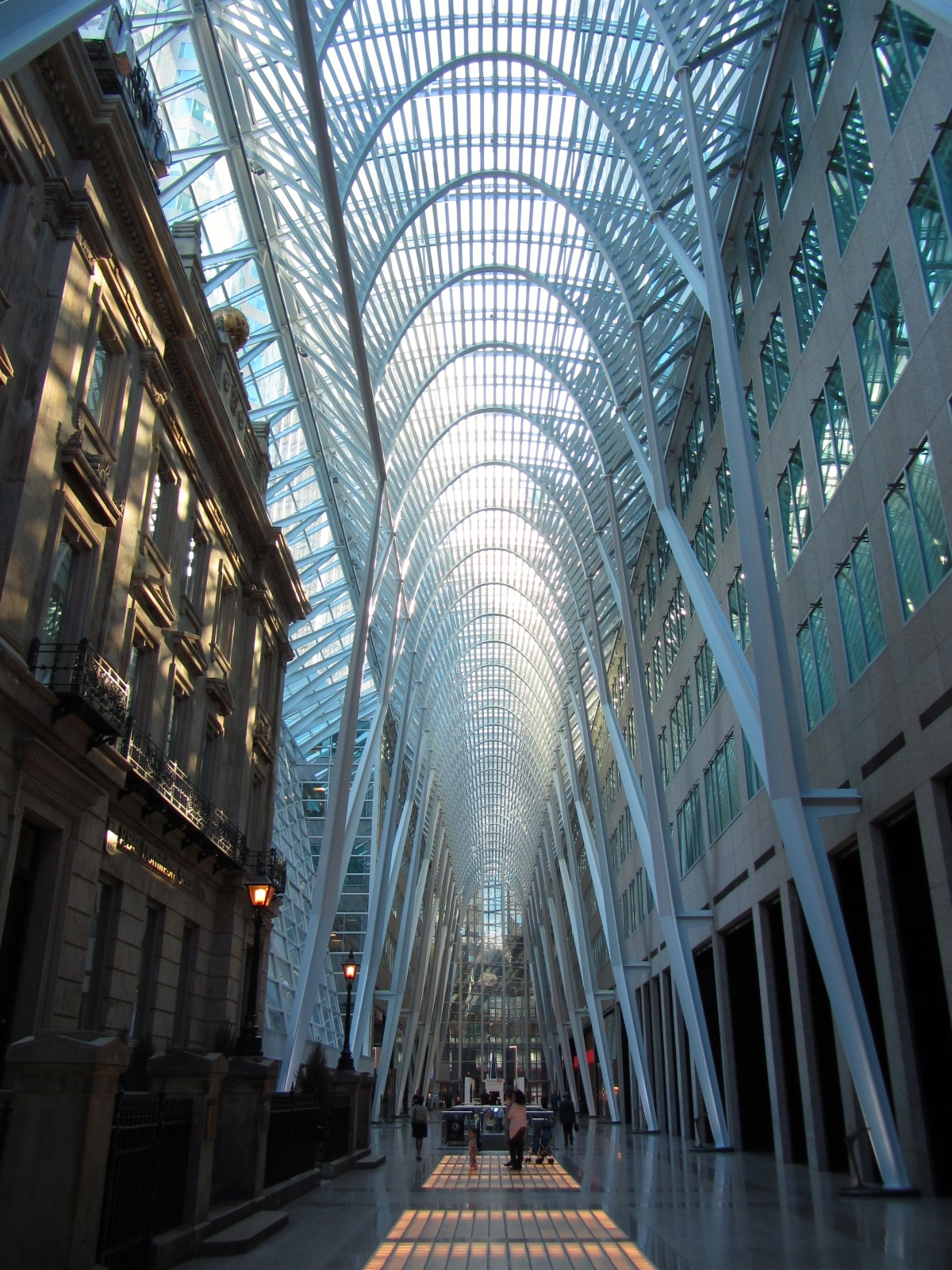
The Hockey Hall of Fame and the Allen Lambert Galleria complex are a major landmark located on Yonge Street.

- 299 Queen Street West
- The St. Regis Toronto
- Art Gallery of Ontario
- Bank of Upper Canada Building
- Randolph Theatre
- Bay Adelaide Centre
- Brookfield Place
- Canadian Broadcasting Centre
- Ed Mirvish Theatre
- CN Tower
- Commerce Court
- Elgin and Winter Garden Theatres
- Fairmont Royal York
- First Canadian Place
- First Toronto Post Office
- Four Seasons Centre
- The Grange
- Gooderham Building
- Harbourfront Centre
- Hockey Hall of Fame
- Kensington Market
- Maple Leaf Gardens
- Massey Hall
- Nathan Phillips Square
- Necropolis Chapel
- OCAD University
- Old City Hall
- Osgoode Hall
- Princess of Wales Theatre
- Queen's Park
- Queens Quay
- Rogers Centre
- Roundhouse Park
- Royal Alexandra Theatre
- The Royal Conservatory of Music
- Royal Ontario Museum
- Roy Thomson Hall
- Sankofa Square
- Scotia Plaza
- Scotiabank Arena
- St. Lawrence Hall
- St. Lawrence Market
- Toronto City Hall
- Toronto-Dominion Centre
- Toronto Eaton Centre
- Toronto Metropolitan University
- Union Station
- University of Toronto (St. George campus)

== Education ==
The Royal Conservatory of Music, a non-profit music education institution is headquartered in downtown Toronto.

=== Primary and secondary ===
Four different public school boards provide primary and secondary education for the City of Toronto, including its downtown area. Two Toronto school boards provide instruction in the English language, the secular Toronto District School Board, and the separate Toronto Catholic District School Board. The other two, the secular Conseil scolaire Viamonde and the separate Conseil scolaire catholique MonAvenir, provide instruction in the French language in and beyond Toronto.

Several independent schools also operate within downtown Toronto.

=== Tertiary ===
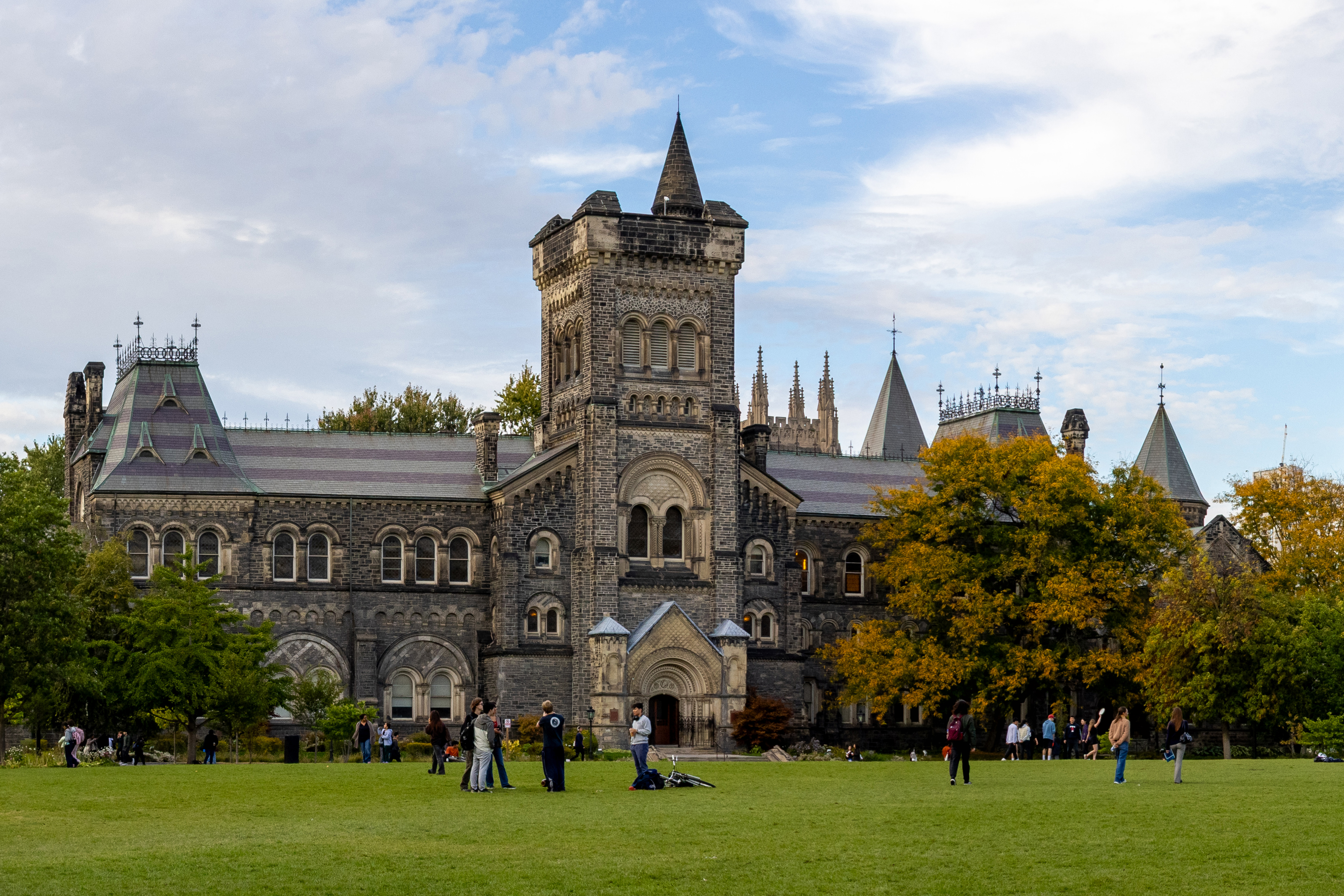
The University of Toronto's St. George campus is located in the north-west portion of downtown.

Downtown Toronto is home to four public universities - the University of Toronto, OCAD University, Université de l'Ontario français and Toronto Metropolitan University. OCAD University is an arts school whose main building is located in Grange Park. The Université de l'Ontario français is a French-language postsecondary institution situated in East Bayfront. Toronto Metropolitan University and the University of Toronto are research universities, with the former located in the Garden District and the latter's St. George campus (the largest of its three) situated in the Discovery District. The University of Toronto's other two campuses are located outside the downtown core, in Mississauga and Scarborough.

Colleges based in downtown Toronto include the public George Brown College. Four other public colleges that are based in the city, but outside the downtown core, operate satellite branches in the downtown core, including Collège Boréal, Georgian College, Humber College and the Seneca Polytechnic. There are also private career colleges in downtown Toronto, including Toronto Film School, Trebas Institute, and the Randolph College for the Performing Arts.

== Retail ==
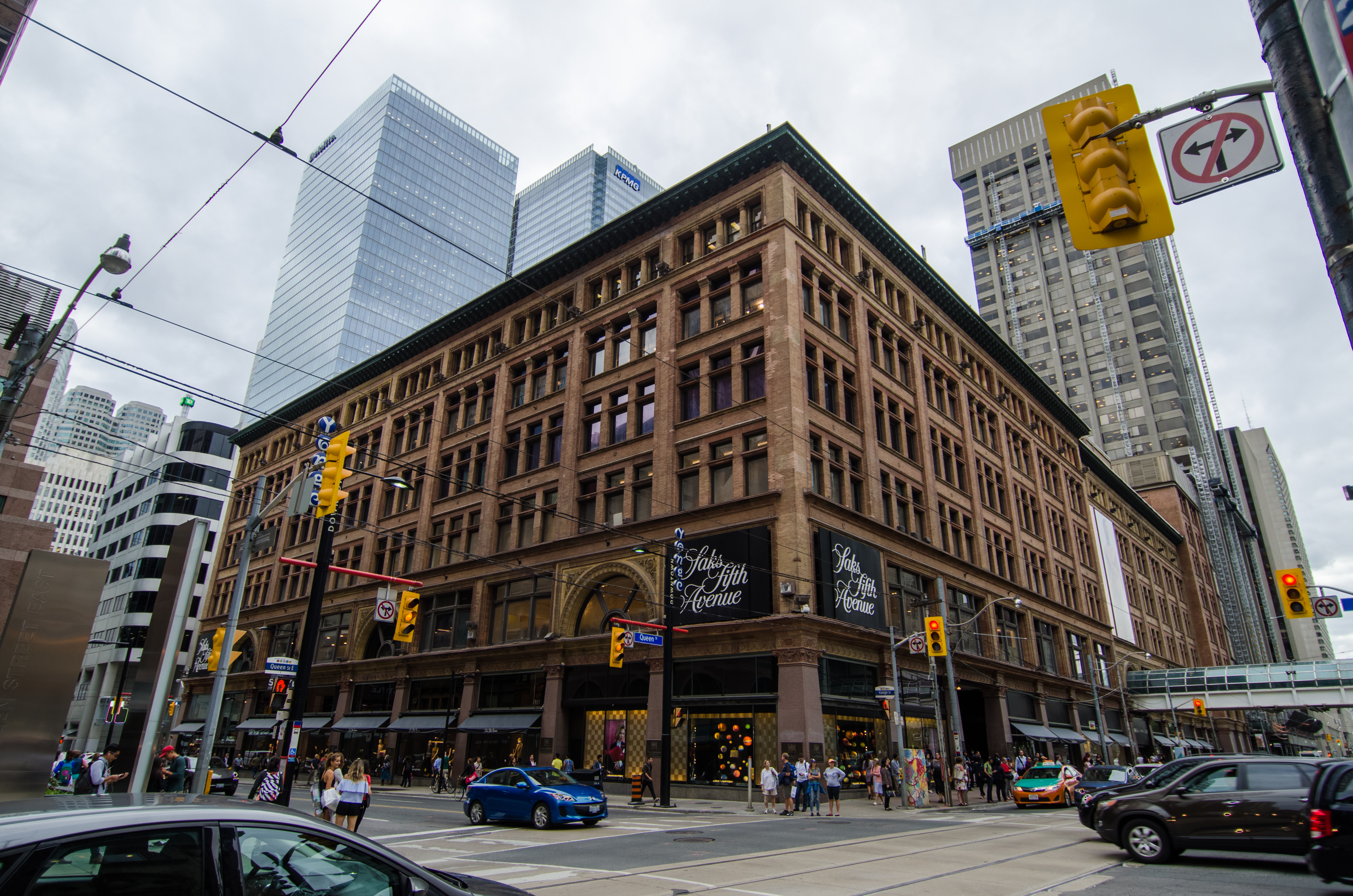
Saks Fifth Avenue department store.

Downtown Toronto is home to the flagship department stores of The Bay, Saks Fifth Avenue and Holt Renfrew. The traditional shopping districts concentrated on Queen Street West and King Street East have seen recent growth to encompass the area surrounding Sankofa Square. The Old Town portion of the downtown, stretching from St. Lawrence Market to the Distillery District is home to many furniture stores, interior design studios and contemporary casual dining options.

The CF Toronto Eaton Centre, a large, multilevel enclosed shopping mall and office complex that spans several blocks and houses 330 stores, is the city's top tourist attraction with over one million visitors weekly. Other indoor shopping malls include College Park, the Tenor, Aura, Yorkville Village, Atrium on Bay, Village by the Grange, Manulife Centre and the PATH underground city network, the largest underground shopping complex in the world.

Emerging retail destinations include Mirvish Village, the Well and the renovated St. Lawrence Market North.

== Transportation ==
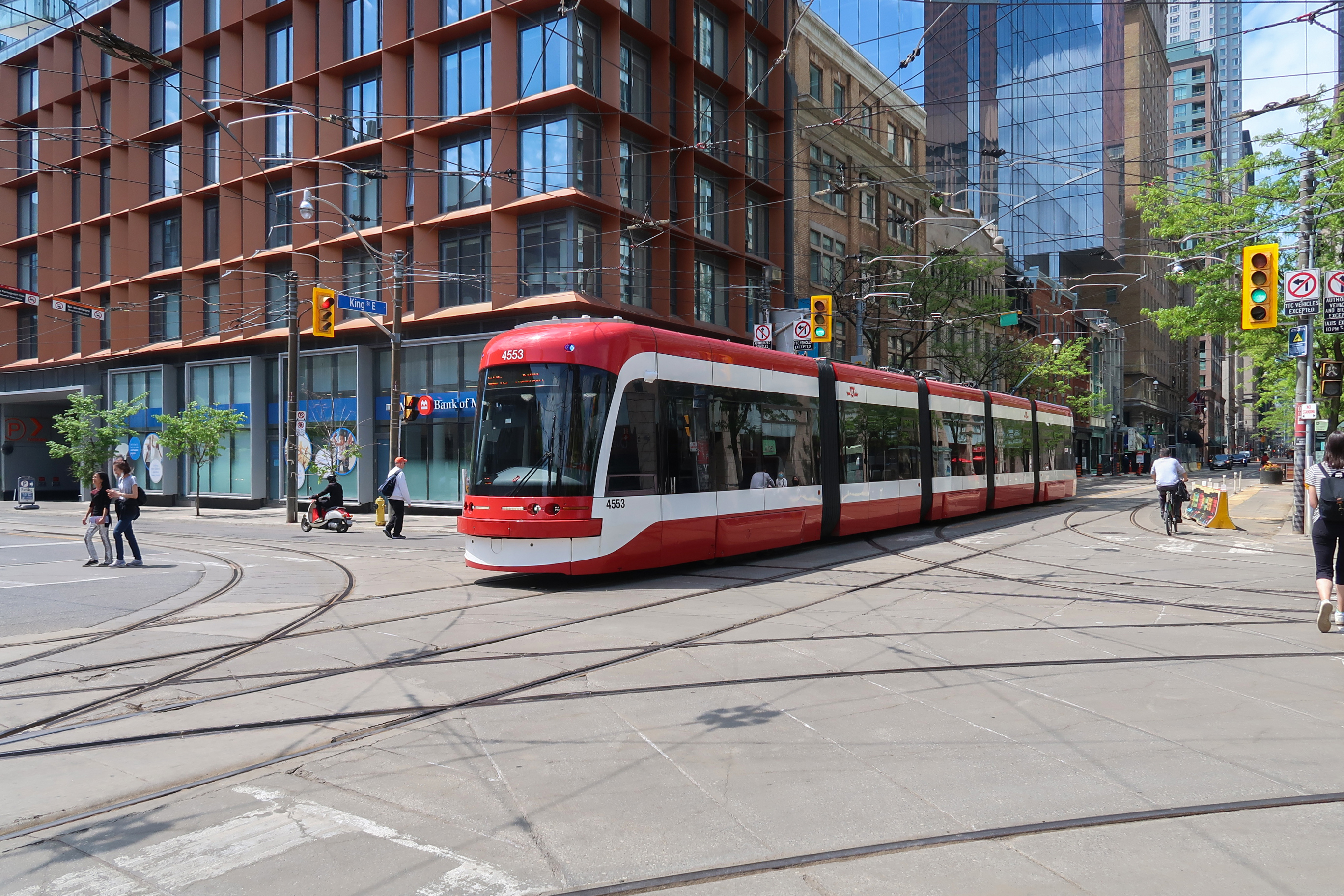
The TTC operates bus, streetcar, and subway systems.

Yonge Street, a major arterial route in the city, begins at the northern shore of the Toronto Harbour and runs through downtown, continuing north all the way to the city of Barrie, Ontario. Other notable streets include Dundas, Bloor, Queen, King, and University.

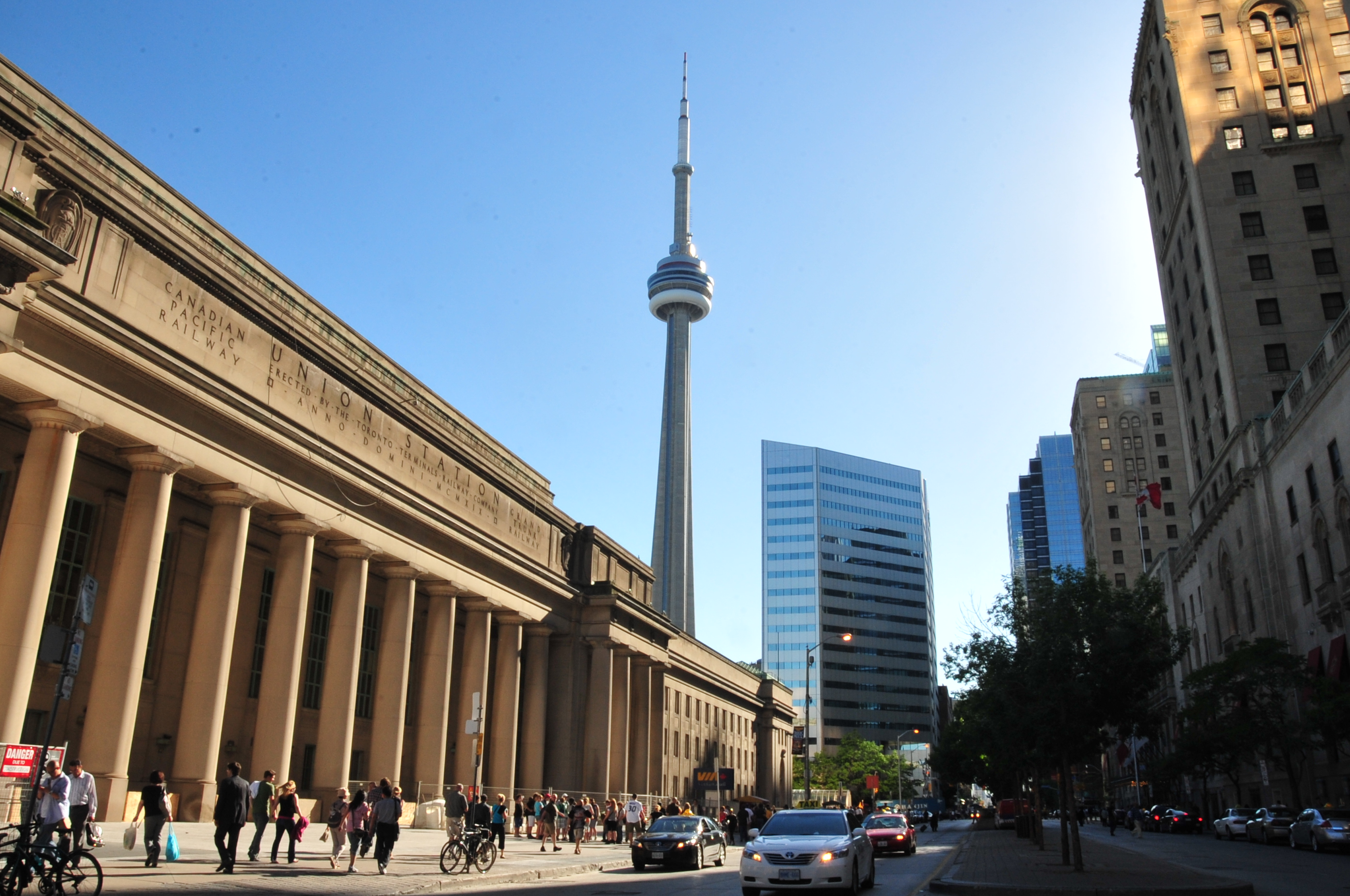
Union Station, Toronto's main intermodal transit hub providing inter-city Via Rail services and commuter services to the rest of the city region.

The Toronto Transit Commission administers the Toronto area's public transportation system, including buses, streetcar, and subways. The regional public transportation service, GO Transit, also provides bus and commuter train service to downtown Toronto from its hub, Union Station. Union Station is the city's major intermodal transportation hub, providing access not only to local and regional public transit, but also to inter-city rail services like Via Rail.

In addition to surface-level pedestrian sidewalks, much of downtown Toronto is also connected through the PATH Underground, an extensive network of underground pedestrian tunnels, skyways, and at-grade walkways.

Nearby airports include Billy Bishop Toronto City Airport, which is adjacent to the downtown area, and the much larger Toronto Pearson International Airport located 27 km to the northwest.

== See also ==
- List of central business districts
- List of tallest buildings in Toronto
