= Tollhouse =

Building from which tolls are collected

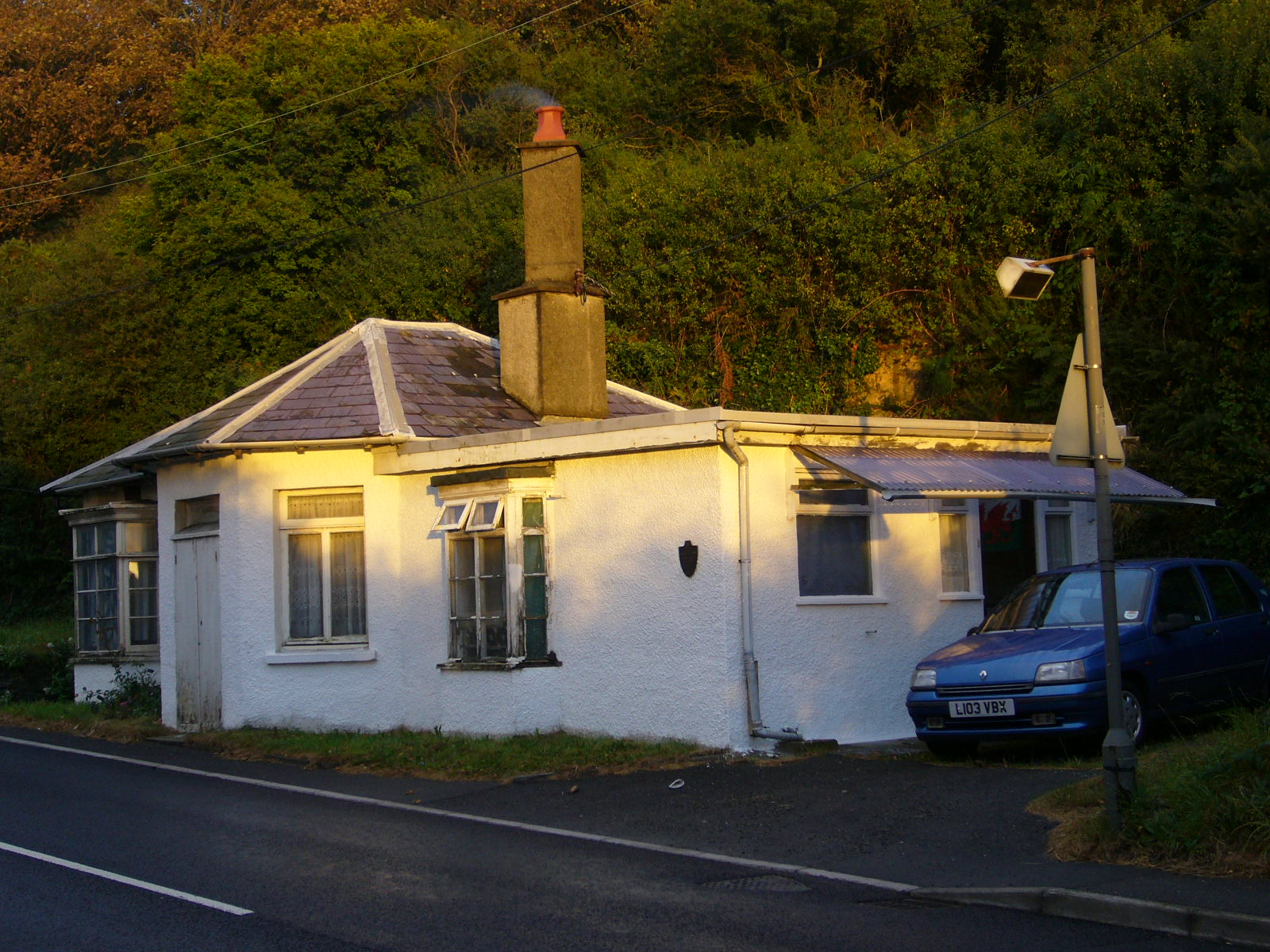
Northgate Toll House, Aberaeron

A tollhouse or toll house is a building with accommodation for a toll collector, beside a tollgate on a toll road, canal, or toll bridge.

== History ==
Many tollhouses were built by turnpike trusts in England, Wales and Scotland during the 18th and early 19th centuries. Those built in the early 19th century often had a distinctive bay front to give the pikeman a clear view of the road and to provide a display area for the tollboard. In 1840, according to the Turnpike Returns in Parliamentary Papers, there were over 5,000 tollhouses operating in England. These were sold off in the 1880s when the turnpikes were closed. Many were demolished but several hundred have survived for residential or other use, with distinctive features of the old tollhouses still visible.

Canal toll houses were built in very similar style to those on turnpikes. They are sited at major canal locks or at junctions. The great age of canal-building in Britain was in the 18th century, so the majority exhibit the typical features of vernacular Georgian architecture. In the English Midlands, a major area of 18th century canal development, most are of mellow red brick and hexagonal in plan, and tall enough to give the lock keeper a good view of local traffic on the canal. Being small, most have proved unsuitable for occupation, and so are often used as shops or tourist information outlets.

The manager's office in modern toll plazas in the United States is also referred to as a "toll house" even though it is not used as a residence.

== Gallery ==
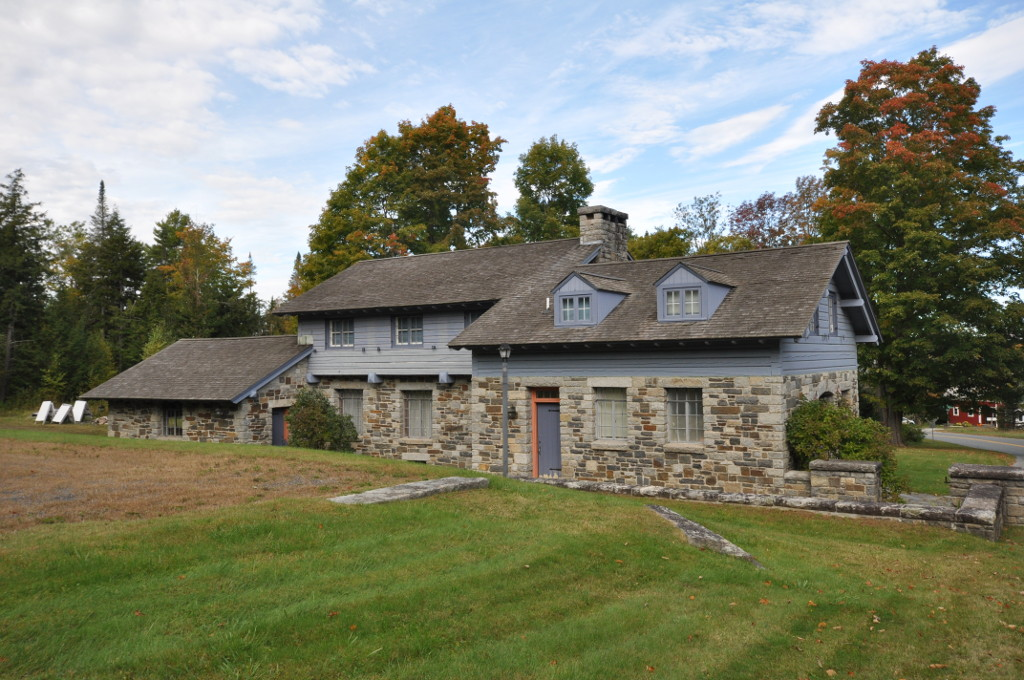
Toll House in Burke, Vermont. This house was home to the toll collector for the road on Burke Mountain.

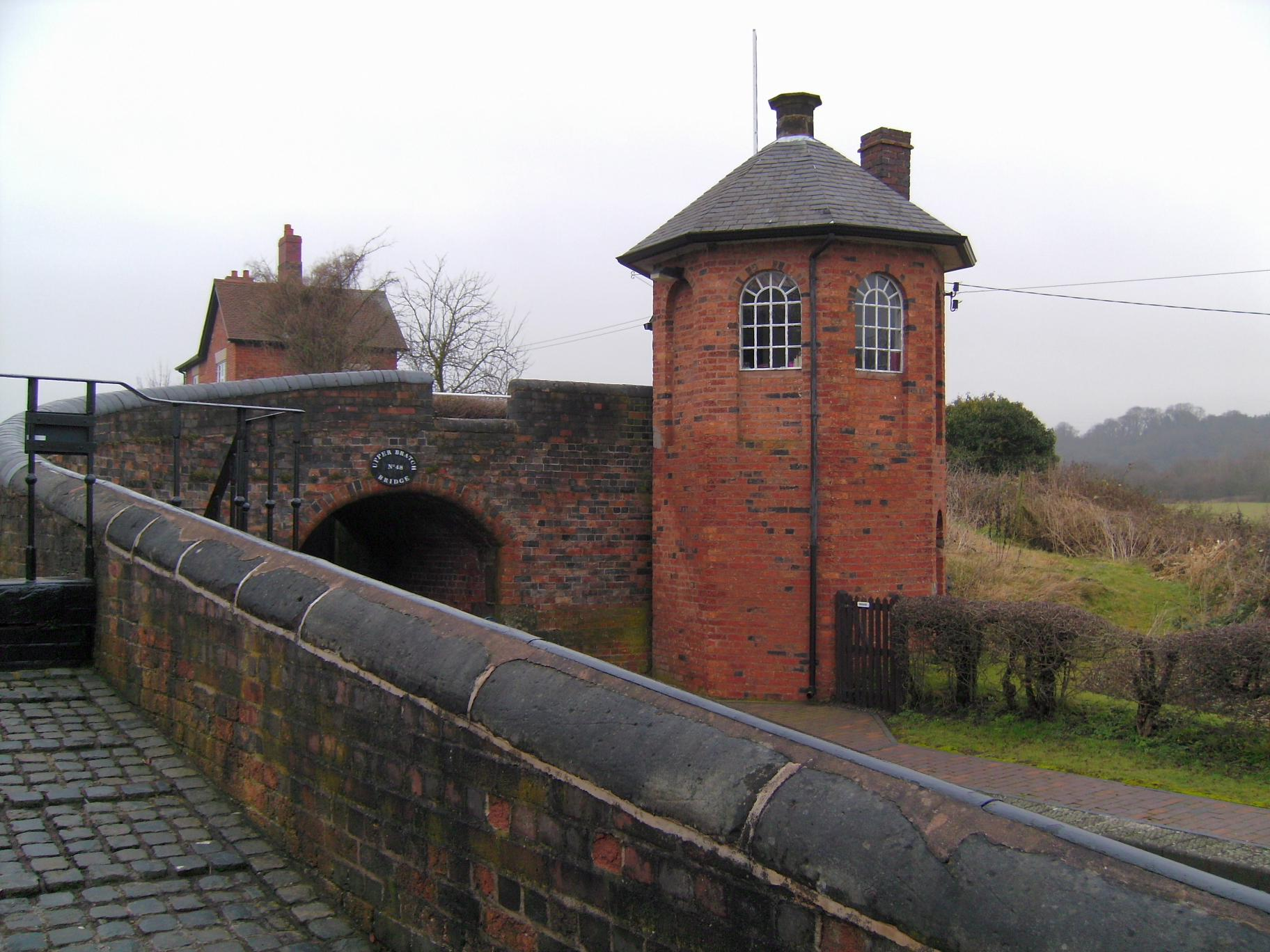
Toll house at the Bratch Locks, Wombourne, on the Staffordshire and Worcestershire Canal, circa 1772

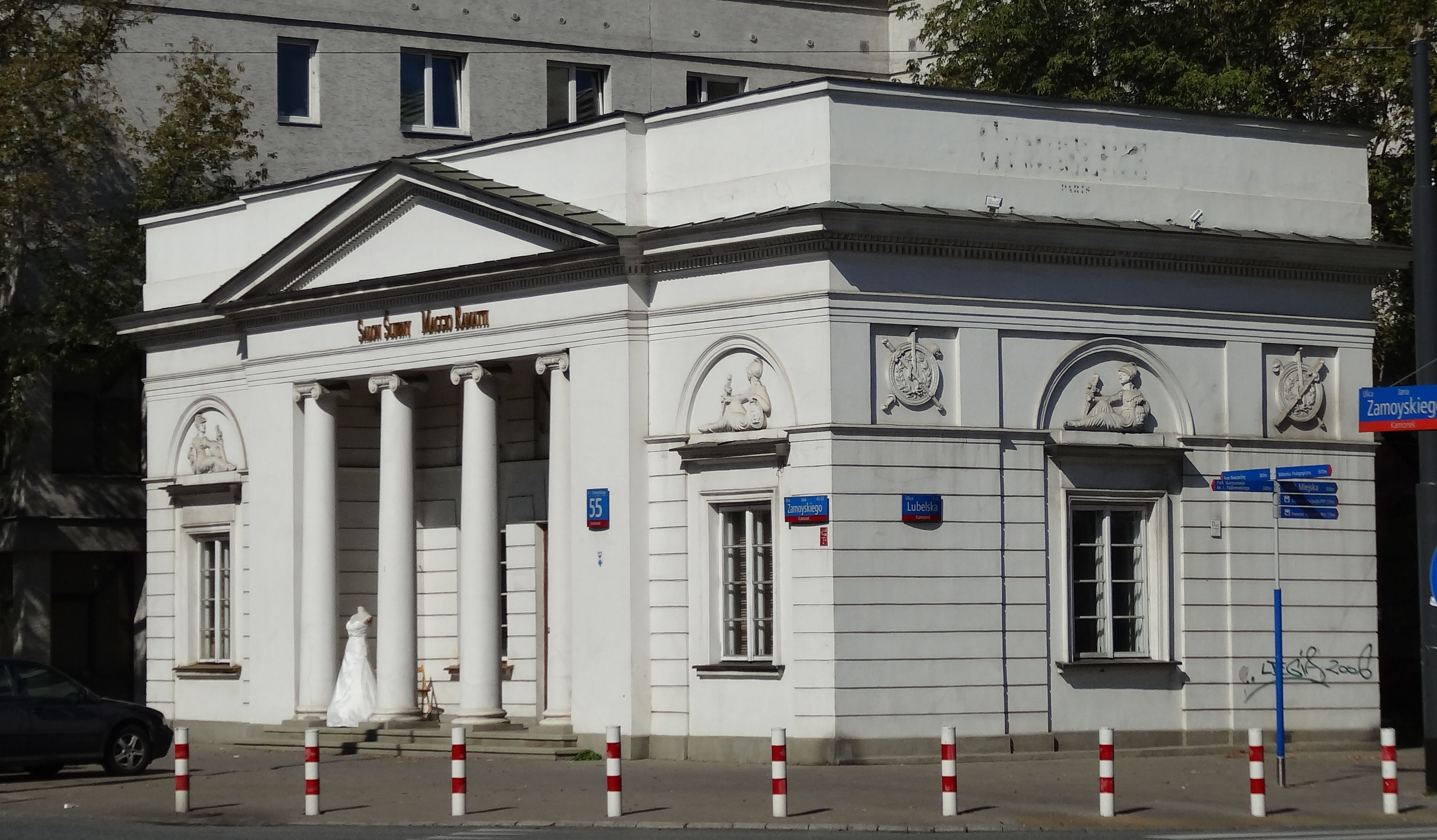
The Grochów Tollhouse in Praga-Południe, Warsaw, Poland

== See also ==
- Tollkeeper's cottages in Ontario
- Tholsel, from the English word tolsey
- Tollbooth

== Bibliography ==
Tollhouses in England:

- Haynes, R. & Slocombe, I. (2004) Wiltshire Toll Houses, publ. Hobnob Press, Salisbury. (ISBN 0946418-21-7)
- Kanefsky, J. (1976) Devon Tollhouses, Exeter Ind Arch. Group, University of Exeter (ISBN 978-0-9501778-8-5)
- Jenkinson, T, Taylor, P (2009) The Toll-houses of South Devon, Polystar Press (ISBN 978-1-907154-01-0)
- Jenkinson, T, Taylor, P (2010) The Toll-houses of North Devon, Polstar Press (ISBN 978-1-907154-03-4
- Searle, M. (1930), Turnpikes and Toll-bars, publ. Hutchinson
- Taylor, P. (2001) The Toll-houses of Cornwall, publ. The Federation of Old Cornwall Societies. (ISBN 0902660-29-2)
- Taylor, P (2010) The Toll-houses of Essex, Polystar Press (ISBN 978-1-907154-04-1
- Ward, M & A (2011) The Toll House, Medlar Press, Shropshire (ISBN 978-1-907110-18-4)
