= St. Lawrence, Toronto =

Coordinates: 43.649°N 79.372°W

St. Lawrence
- Neighbourhood
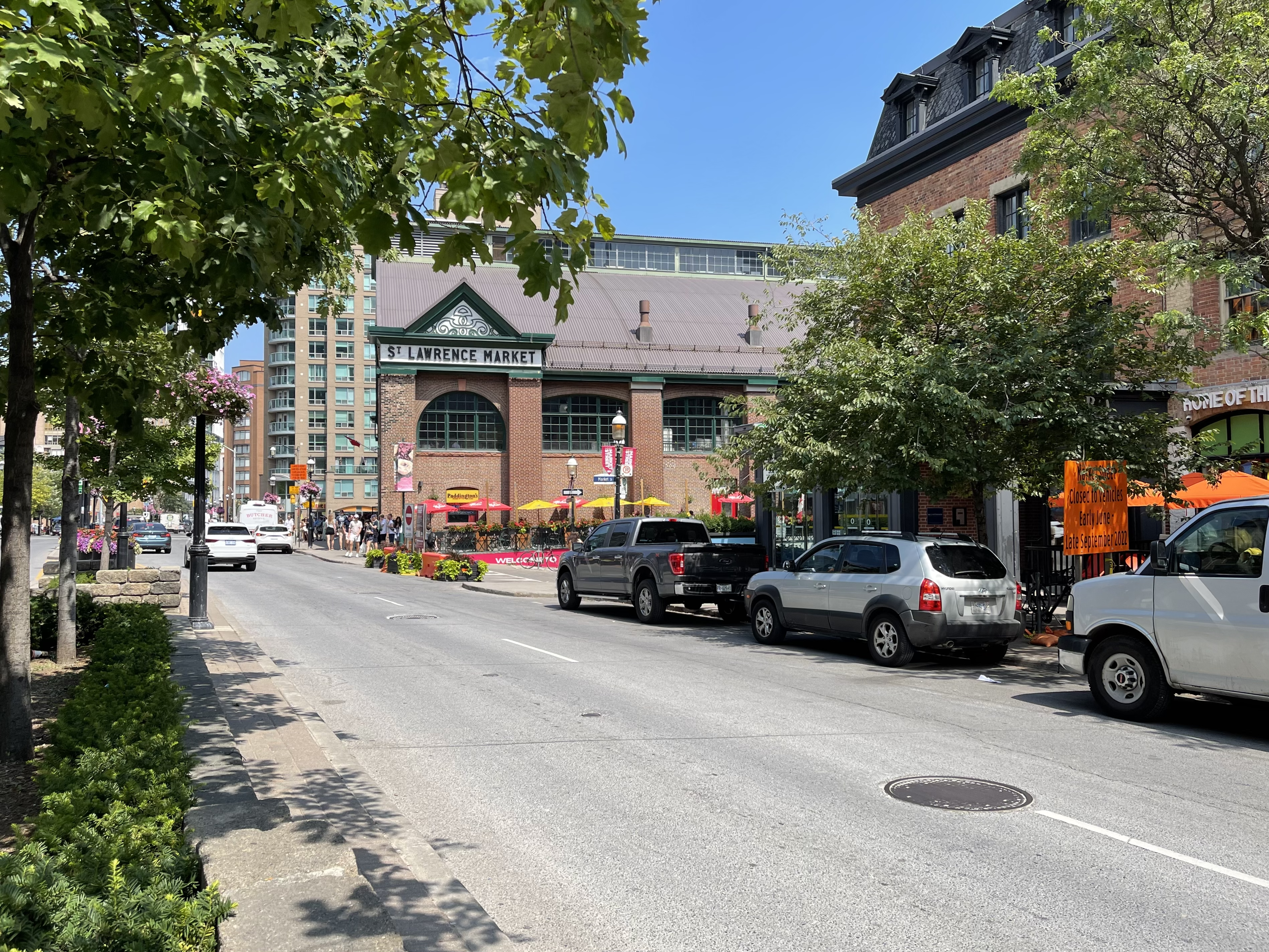
- View of St. Lawrence and St. Lawrence Market from Front Street

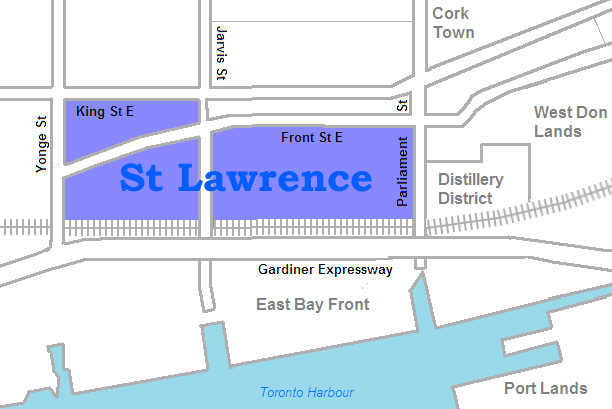
- City: Toronto
- Province: Ontario
- Country: Canada

St. Lawrence is a neighbourhood located in downtown Toronto, Ontario, Canada. The area, a former industrial area, is bounded by Yonge, Front, and Parliament Streets, and the Canadian National railway embankment. The Esplanade off Yonge St., lined with restaurants, cafés and hotels runs through the middle of the area. In previous times, the area was sometimes referred to as 'St. Lawrence Ward' or more often today as 'St. Lawrence Market', synonymous with the large retail vendor market which is the neighbourhood's focal point. The area is the site of a large city-sponsored housing project of the 1970s, which revitalized an old brownfields area. The boundaries of the St Lawrence Neighbourhood Association and the St Lawrence Market BIA are somewhat larger than those noted above. Both groups have boundaries that extend from Yonge to Parliament Streets and Queen Street East to the rail corridor.

== History ==
The town of York was founded in 1793, on a site of ten blocks north of Front Street between George and Berkeley streets, in present day Old Town, Toronto. Much of the area of today's St. Lawrence neighbourhood was then located in Toronto Harbour, the shoreline being just south of Front Street. The area was infilled to provide more land for port and industrial uses adjacent. St. Lawrence was the first industrial area of York.

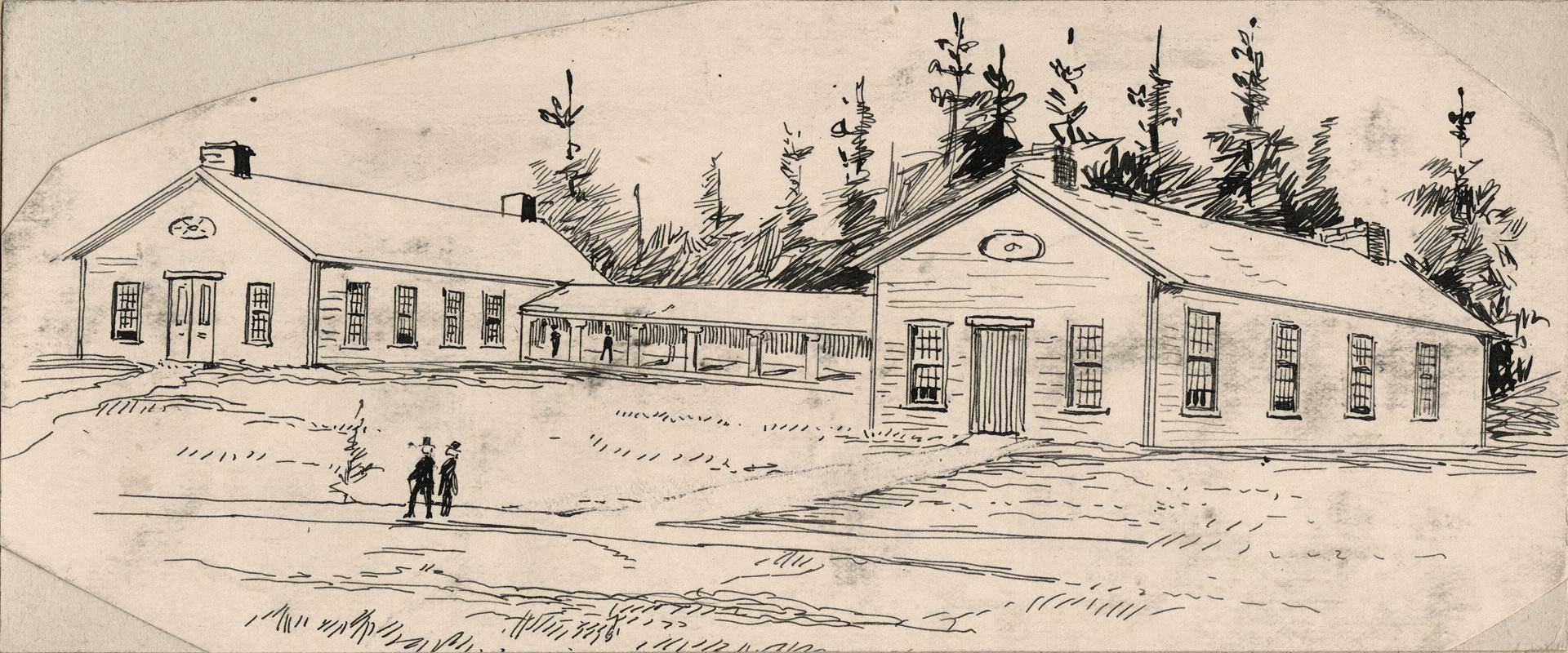
The Upper Canada legislature southwest of Front and Parliament Street. Completed in 1794, the complex was razed in 1813, after the Battle of York.

The first parliament buildings in Upper Canada in 1793 were constructed on the southwest corner of Parliament and Front Street. The buildings have long since gone from the site, but a discovery was made in 2000 when a quick dig of the property revealed the old parliament building footings, in addition to some pottery from that time. The City of Toronto and the Government of Ontario now own most of the property. There is a marker for the First Parliament Buildings at Parliament Square Park, West of Parliament Street, East of Berkeley, and South of Front. The marker is actually south of the original site. The Ontario Heritage Trust set up the Parliament Interpretive Centre at Front and Berkeley to provide historical information about this parliament that was destroyed by American troops during the War of 1812. The Centre was open from 2012 to 2015, in remembrance of the 200th anniversary of the war.

A Saturday farmers' market began operation at Front and Jarvis in 1803. The current South Market building, south of Front, is open Tuesday through Saturday, selling foods and other goods. The North Market building hosted a farmers' market on Saturdays and a flea market on Sundays until its demolition in 2016, at which time they both moved to a temporary building south of The Esplanade. A new, larger North Market Building has been constructed on the original site and opened in May 2025.

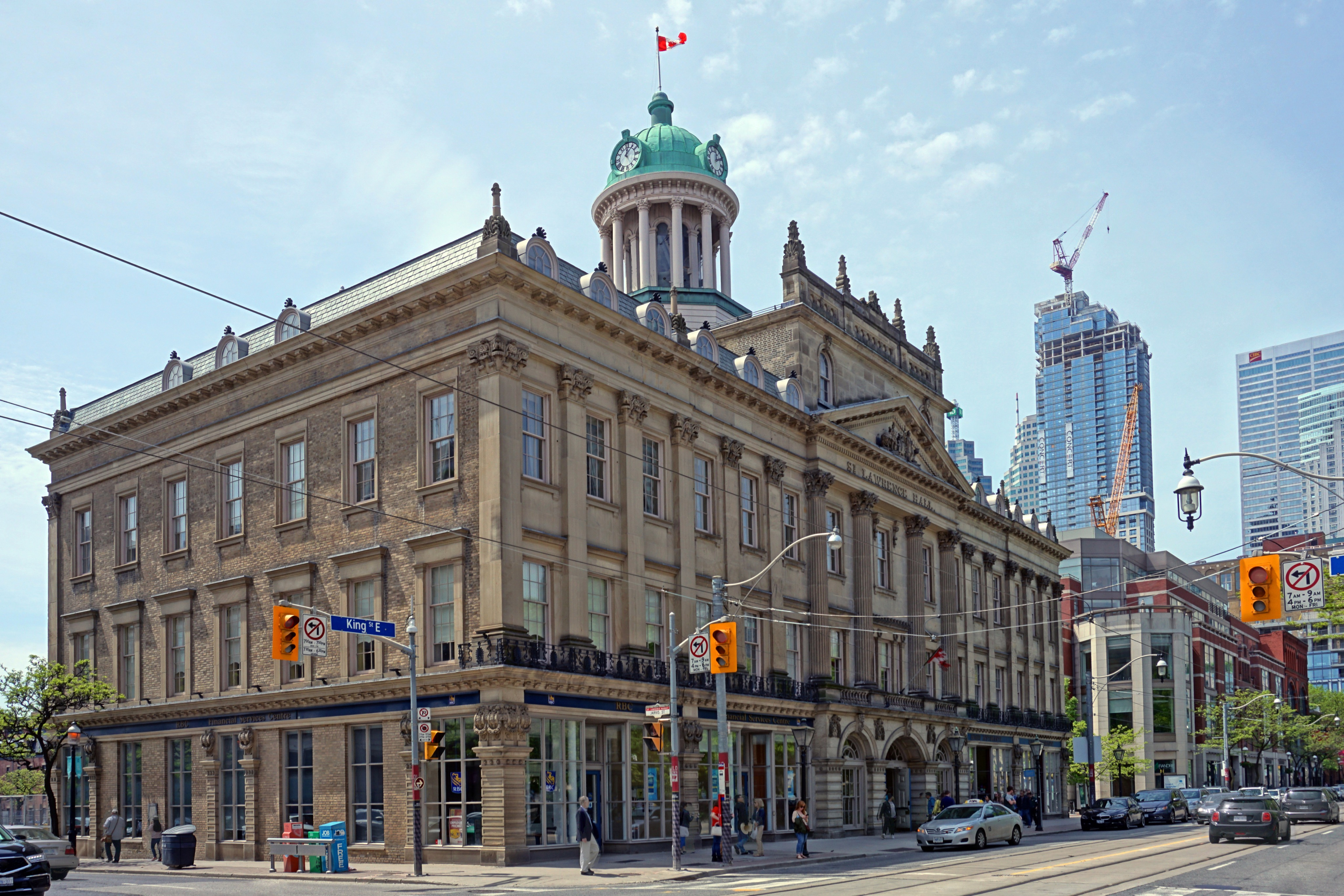
St. Lawrence Hall was erected in 1854 as a public meeting hall for residents of Toronto. It was built after the 1849 fire of Toronto.

In 1834, Toronto's first city hall was built on the southwest corner of King St. East & Jarvis St. at the old 'Market' building from 1834 (the year of Toronto's incorporation from the former town of York) to 1844. This building was damaged during the great fire of 1849 and replaced with the grandiose St. Lawrence Hall and a market building (today's North Market).

A larger city hall, also housing a police station and jail cells, opened in 1845 with a 140 ft (43 m) long facade along the south side of Front Street. City Hall was moved out of the area in 1899 to what is now Old City Hall before moving once again to its current location. The 1845 city hall was integrated into the St. Lawrence Market South building in 1899. In 1972, the remains of the city hall were converted into the "Market Gallery". The old council chamber is all that remains of the original city hall and is located on the gallery's second floor.

By 1840, the waterfront was completely taken over by government and merchant wharves. The Esplanade, a 100 feet (30 m)-wide road, was proposed, just south of Front Street, with new water lots made from cribbing and filling of the shore to the south. The waterfront was extended to a survey line from the point of the Gooderham windmill west to a point due east of the old Fort Rouillé. Ostensibly for carriages and carts, the roadway eventually became primarily the route for rail lines in the central core. In exchange for 40 feet (12 m) of the Esplanade, the railways underwrote the infilling of the harbour. The Esplanade and infill project was completed by 1865.

Commercial activity along Toronto's bustling harbour provided employment and was the primary place of entry to the quickly growing, burgeoning city. The convergence of the railway lines and the wharves must have worked because in 1873 historian Henry Scadding so eloquently wrote in his book Old Toronto of The Esplanade "...It has done for Toronto what the Thames Embankment has done for London..."

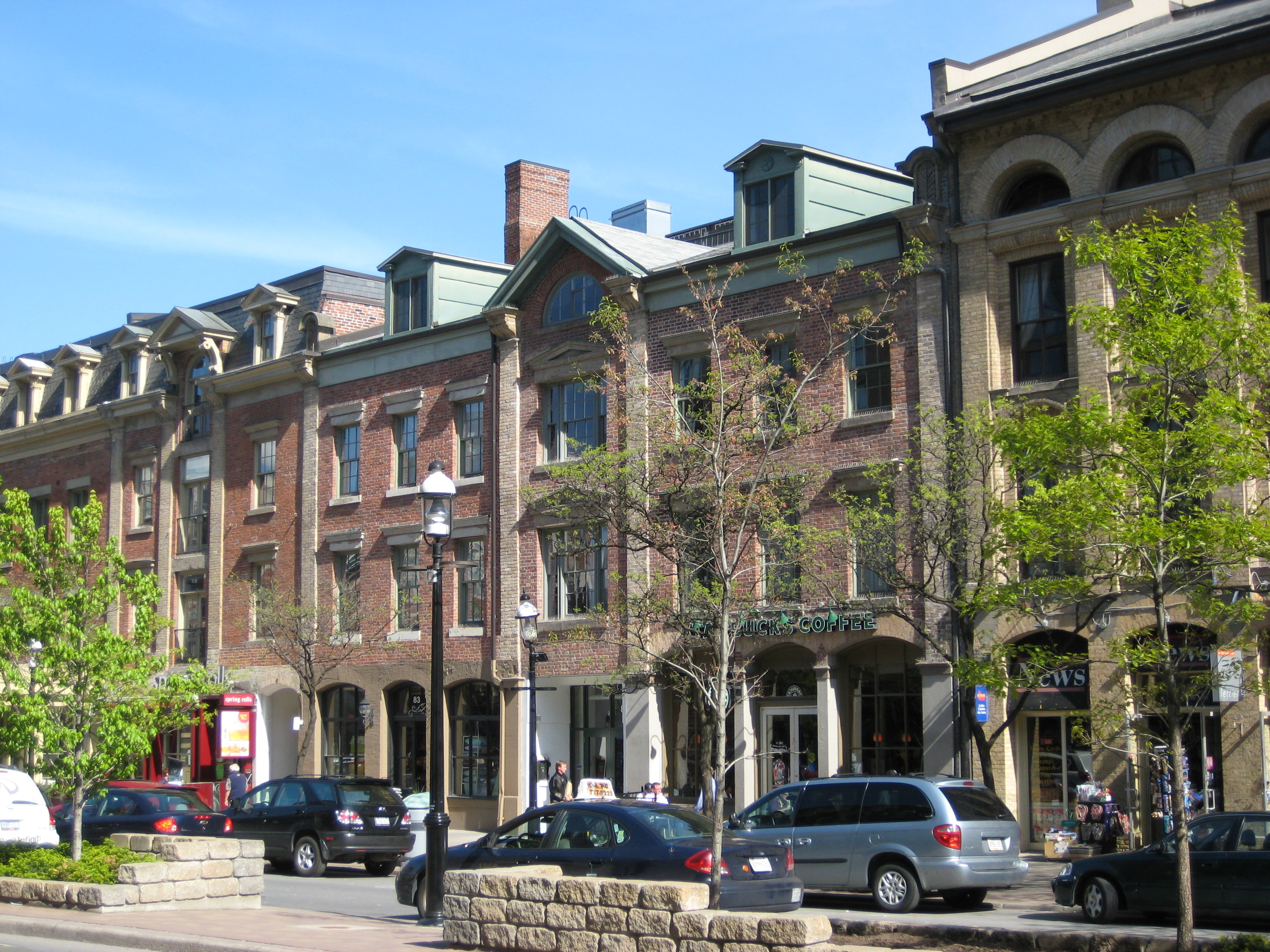
The area consists of commercial and residential developments.

In the 1920s, the railway lines were relocated to a new, raised viaduct to the south of the Esplanade. This left the current section between Yonge and Berkeley Street.

By the 1960s, the industrial uses of the area had declined, leaving numerous empty sites and decrepit buildings. In the 1970s it was decided by Toronto Mayor David Crombie to turn the area into a new residential neighbourhood, but one that would not make the same mistakes of the "urban renewal" housing projects of earlier decades. The neighbourhood was to be integrated into the city with no clear boundaries. It would contain a mix of commercial and residential as with both subsidized and market-oriented housing, mostly rowhouse or low-rise apartments.

The neighbourhood was planned by Alan Littlewood and Frank Lewinberg, with the influence of American-Canadian urban planner Jane Jacobs playing a crucial role. Design guidelines prepared by Eberhard Zeidler were deemed too modern by planners and politicians and were not implemented, replaced instead by the urban design work of George Baird. Many of the developments were not completed until well into the 1990s. Since that time, the St. Lawrence neighbourhood has been critically acclaimed as a major success in urban planning. In many ways, it has become the model for the design and planning of new urban communities across North America.

== Character ==
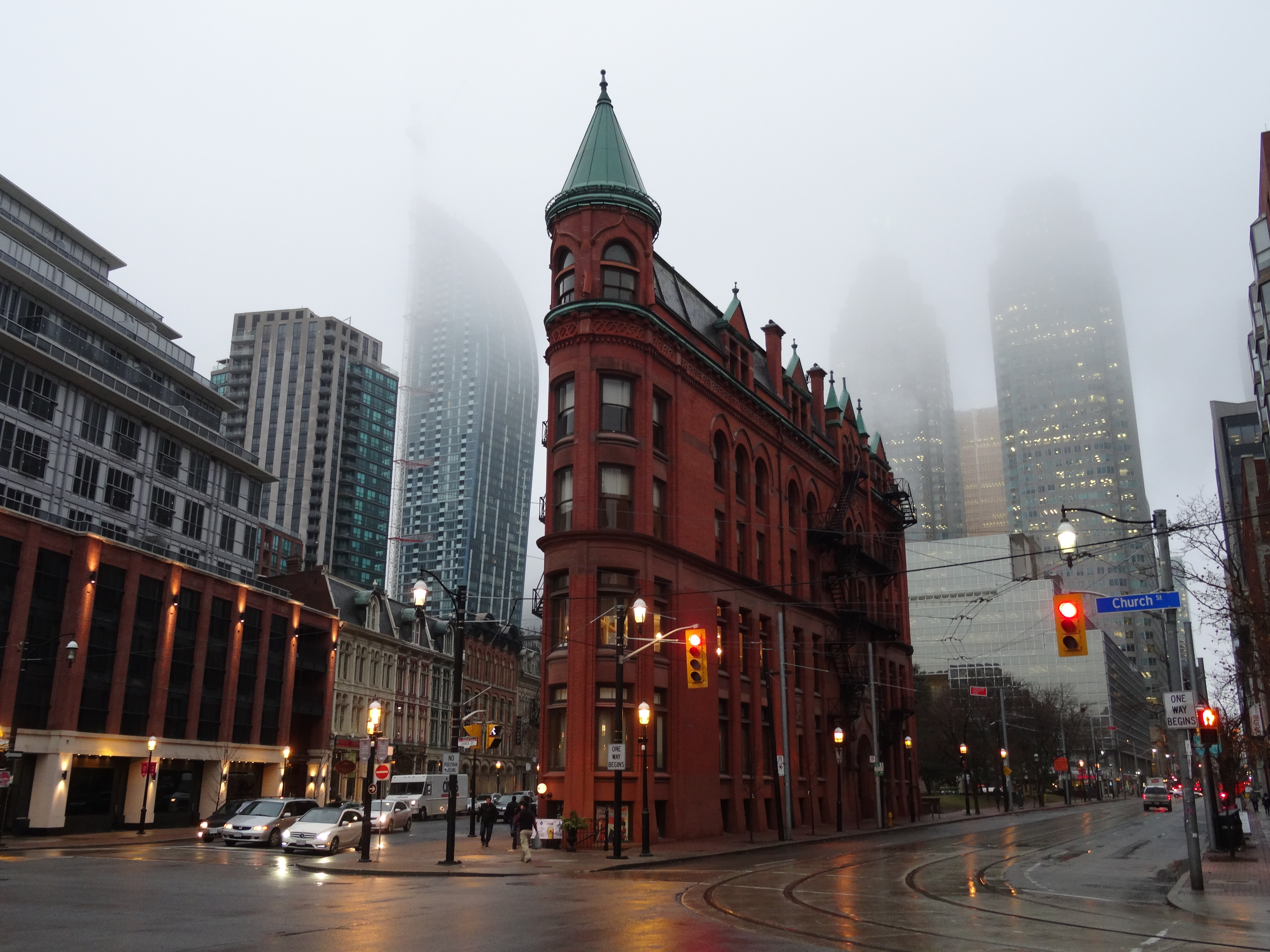
The Gooderham Building is a notable landmark in the area located where Wellington Street merges with Front Street.

Some of the most interesting architecture in the city can be found in St. Lawrence. One notable landmark is the Flatiron building, known for its distinct narrow, wedge shape where Wellington St. merges with Front. Built in 1892, it was the first of this type of building constructed in North America. If viewed from the east, the wedge can be seen in the foreground with the financial skyscrapers and the CN tower rising in the background.

While many of the old industrial buildings along Front Street east of Jarvis have been demolished since the 1950s, several old industrial buildings remain, including old meat-packing plants from the 1800s. Several have been converted into lofts or commercial space.

Front Street is lined on both sides with restaurants. At the intersection of Front and Yonge are two performing arts houses, the St. Lawrence Centre for the Arts, Toronto's "centennial" project and Meridian Hall.

== See also ==
- List of oldest buildings and structures in Toronto
- St. Lawrence Market
