= Casa Loma (neighbourhood) =

- Neighbourhood
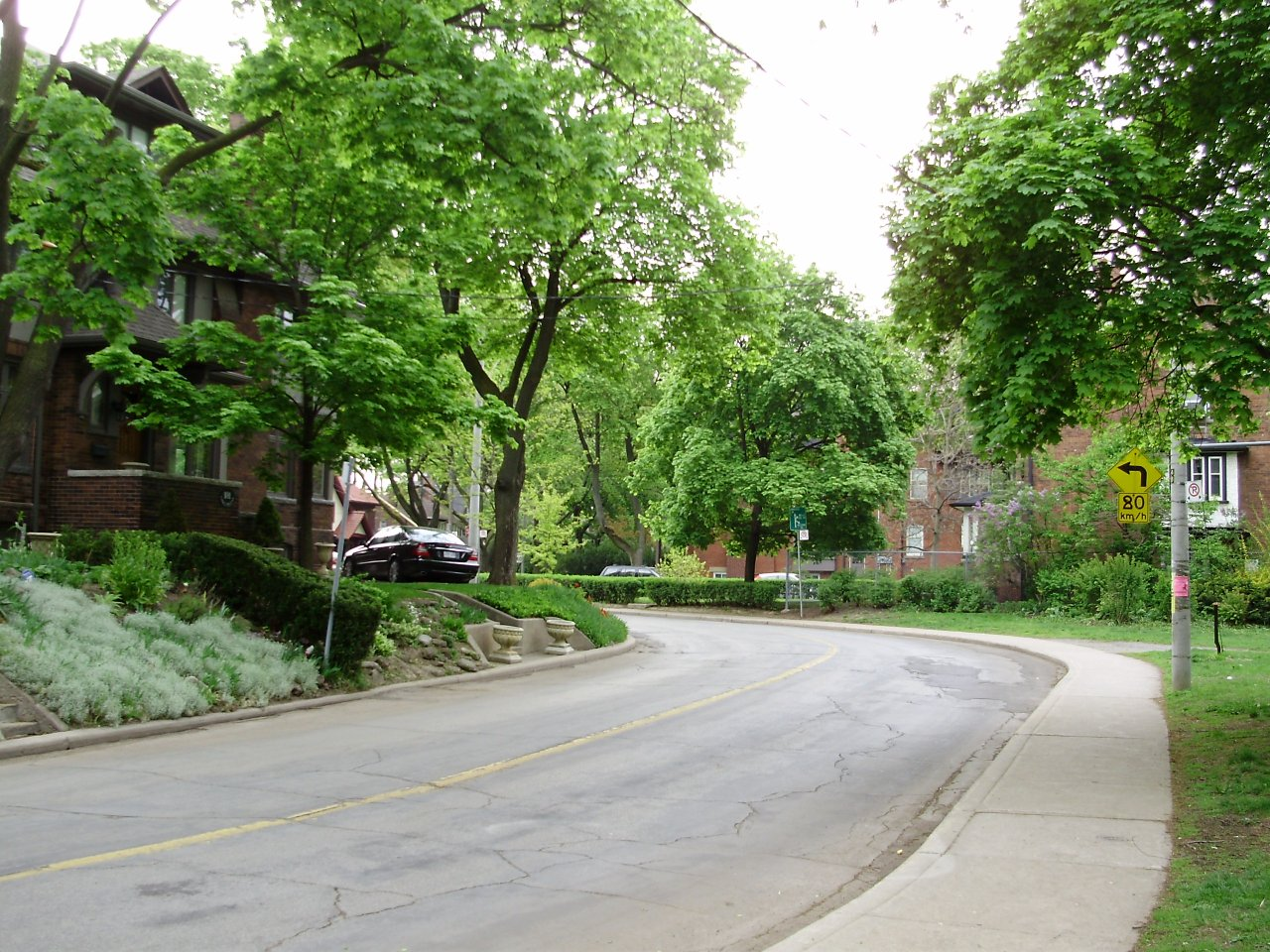
- Looking south down Wells Hill Avenue in Casa Loma neighbourhood

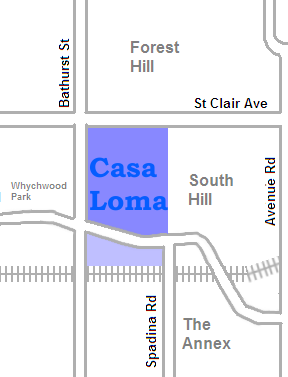
- Location of Casa Loma

- Location within Toronto
- Coordinates: 43.67°N 79.41°W
- Country: Canada
- Province: Ontario
- City: Toronto

Casa Loma is a neighbourhood in the city of Toronto in Ontario, Canada, and is named after the famous castle. It is bounded on the north by St. Clair Avenue West, on the east by Spadina Road, on the south by the CP railway tracks, and on the west by Bathurst Street. Transit access is provided by the TTC's St. Clair West station and 512 St. Clair streetcar route.

== History ==
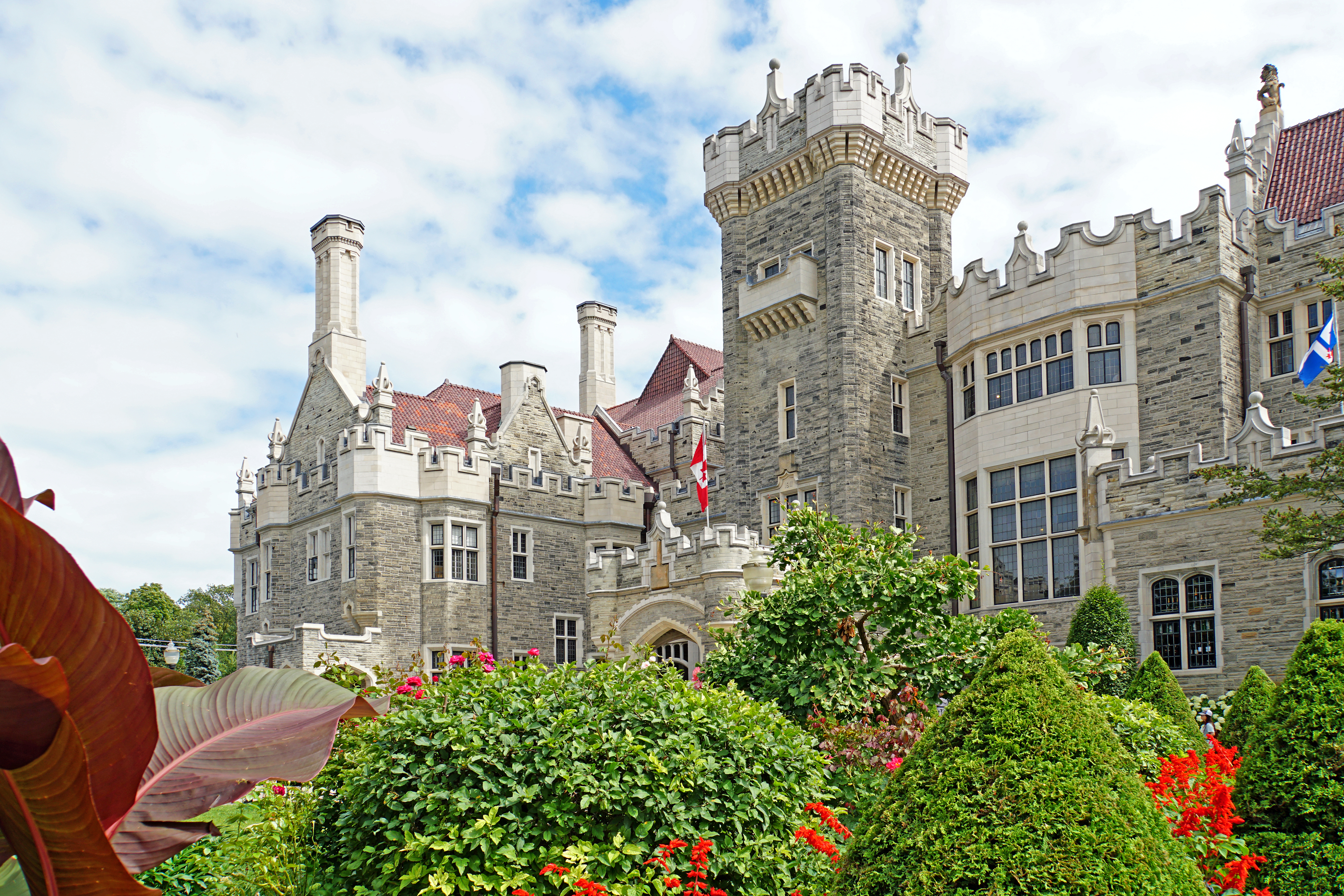
The area's name comes from Casa Loma, a Gothic Revival mansion in the neighbourhood. The mansion was completed in 1914.

Casa Loma was constructed in the early 1900s for over three million dollars and was given to the city by its heavily debt-laden owner only a decade after it was put up.

The prominence of the mansion led to a huge boom in the area, with many wealthy residents setting up shop and defining the present neighbourhood.

== Demographic ==
The following data relates only to census tract 5350118.00. Income distribution is interesting to take into consideration due to the large majority of affluent residents in this neighbourhood. The income distribution data collected by Statistics Canada through the census in 2006 indicates that there are 900 people making under $19,999. The population was 3,900 in 2006, therefore, the 900 people in the income bracket aforementioned makes up 23% of the population within this area.

To acknowledge the changes over time, it is also important to take into consideration the data collected by Statistics Canada in the 2011 census. In 2011, the population decreased from 2006 by 303 people to 3,597. The number of people in the neighbourhood making under $19,999 in 2011 was 945. Therefore, between 2006 and 2011, there was an increase of 45 people in the low income bracket for census tract 5350118.00. Because the population decreased between 2006 and 2011, and the number of people in the low income bracket increased, in 2011, the percentage of the people in the low income bracket (making under $19,999) made up 26% of the population living in census tract 5350118.00.
