= Harbord Village =

- Neighbourhood
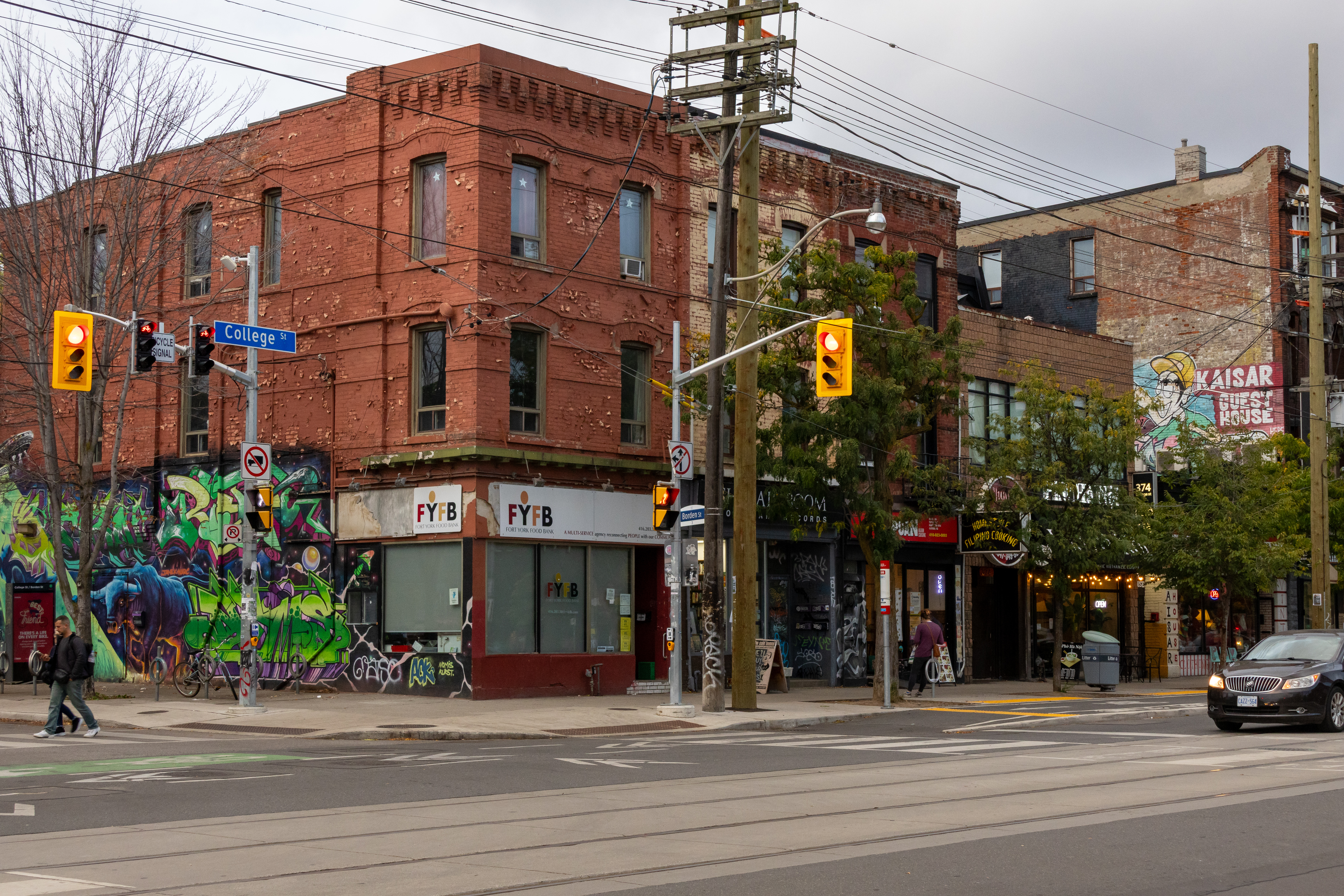
- View of College Street at the southeastern boundary of Harbord Village

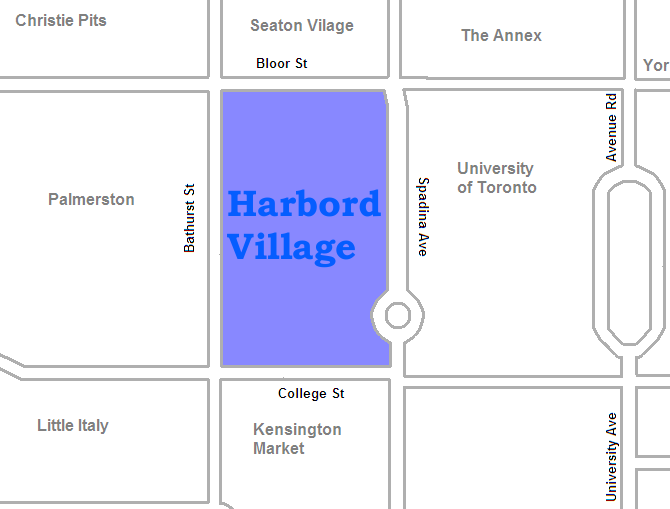

- Location within Toronto
- Coordinates: 43.661°N 79.406°W
- Country: Canada
- Province: Ontario
- City: Toronto
- Neighbourhood: University

Government
  - MP: Danielle Martin (University-Rosedale)
  - MPP: Jessica Bell (University—Rosedale)
  - Councillor: Dianne Saxe (Ward 11 University—Rosedale)

Harbord Village is a neighbourhood in Toronto, Ontario, Canada. It lies just to the west of the University of Toronto's St. George campus, with its most commonly accepted borders being Bloor Street on the north, Spadina Avenue on the east, College Street to the south, and Bathurst Street to the west. Areas west of Bathurst, as far as Ossington are also sometimes included, though they are not covered by the residents' association. (See the website Harbord Village Residents' Association for information about current and past local activities and advocacy projects. The website Harbord Village History shows the results of an extensive Oral History project conducted in 2013.)

The area was previously known as Sussex-Ulster, after two of the major east west streets in the area. In 2000 the residents' association decided to rename itself and the area Harbord Village, after the main street running through the middle of the community. The street's name origin is unclear but could be named for abolitionist Edward Harbord, 3rd Baron Suffield.

The area is also sometimes referred to as the South Annex after the better known "Annex" community to the north. The city of Toronto for administrative purposes places Harbord Village and most of the St. George campus into a region it calls University.

== History ==
The area was primarily opened up for development around 1870, with the initial construction of modest working class houses. Somewhat grander middle class houses began to appear in the late 1880s and 1890s, after a local school had been built and the city had completed paving the streets and installing water and sewer lines. These predominantly bay-and-gable semi-detached houses dominate the current streetscape. Only one block on Brunswick Ave., which was not developed until the 1890s, contains the kind of large houses common to the Annex neighbourhood to the North.

Like most 19th century Torontonians, the initial residents were dominated by immigrants from Great Britain. In the years after the First World War, the neighbourhood gradually became less desirable and more heterogeneous. By the 1930s it had become the home of many immigrants from other parts of the world, including many Eastern European Jews who transformed several of the residences and churches into synagogues (including the First Narayever Congregation which continues to the present day). They, along with the Black residents, faced considerable discrimination renting or buying homes in more affluent Toronto neighbourhoods. As the neighbourhood transitioned into an immigrant reception area, many of the formerly single family houses became shared by two families and boarders. Subsequent waves of immigration altered the demographics of the area, with many Hungarians arriving following the failed revolution in 1956, and Portuguese in the 1960s and 70s.

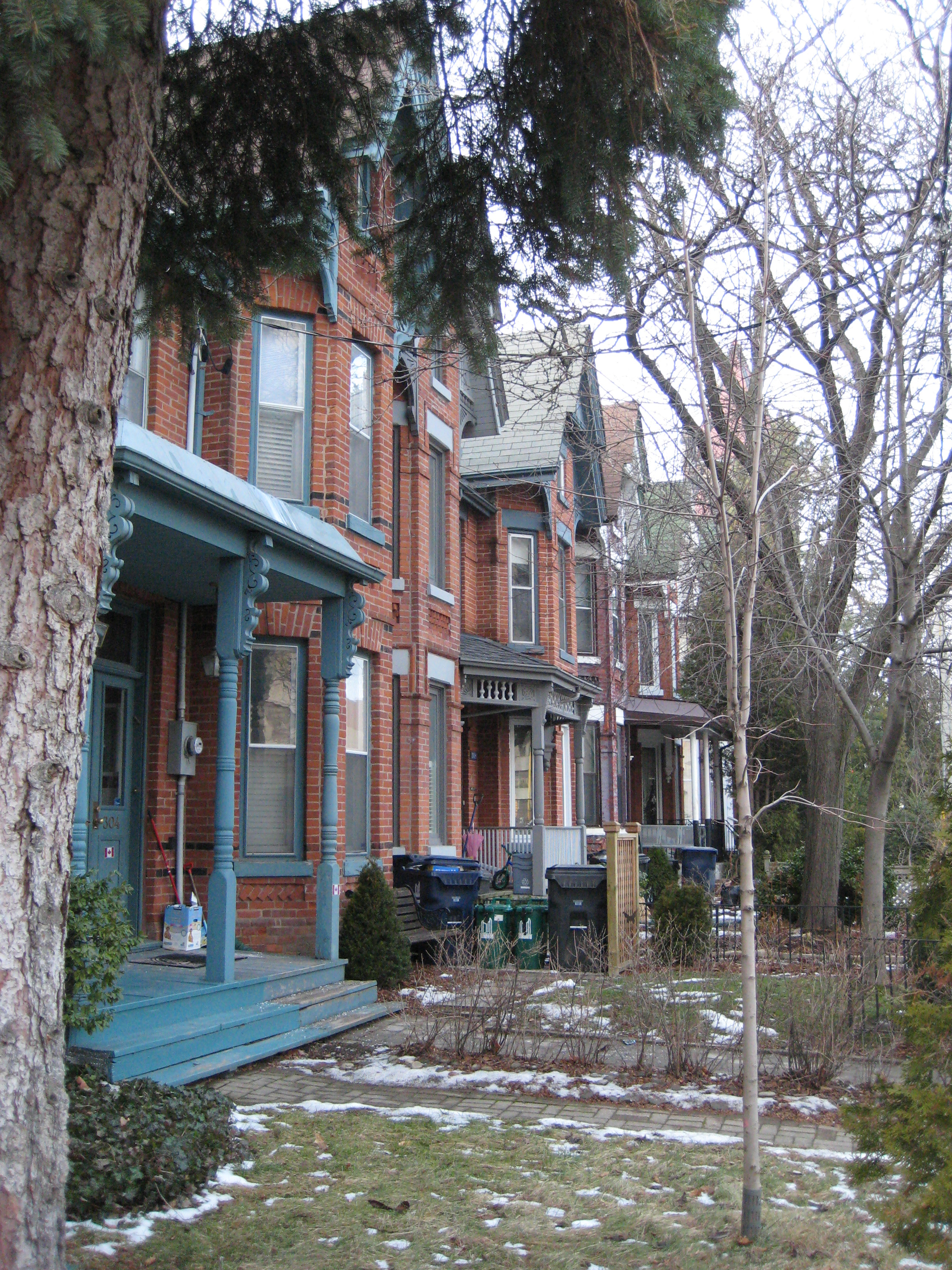
Bay-and-gable-styled houses in Harbord Village. The area was initially built up as a working class and lower middle class community in the late-19th century.

In the late 1960s, partially in conjunction with the planned Spadina Expressway, the city designated the area a slum and planned to demolish and redevelop a large part of it with tall tower blocks as they did with St. James Town. This resulted in the demolition of most of the houses on one block at the Northeast corner of the neighbourhood, and led residents to organize in opposition, forming the Sussex-Ulster Residents' Association. They were successful. Smaller towers were built along Spadina and the rest was given to the University of Toronto to create playing fields and outdoor recreation for their students and the local community. It is currently being redeveloped by the University to serve as an expanded sports field and a public park.

In the 1970s and 80s the neighbourhood was gradually gentrified with an influx of professionals, many affiliated with the university, although many of the houses remained divided into apartments and populated by a diverse mix of people. Since the 1990s many of the houses have been restored to single family dwellings, and because of the heated real estate market, an increasing number are being gutted and rebuilt by developers to sell as luxury properties for several million dollars.

In 2005, the Harbord Village Heritage Conservation District was established in the area of Lower Brunswick Avenue (below Ulster St.) as well as Willcocks Street west of Spadina. In 2009, it was expanded to include Robert Street and Sussex Avenue. The Harbord Village Residents' Association hopes the entire area will become a heritage conservation district.

Lippincott Street runs north-south through Harbord Village, and is an example of the architectural style which used to typify the area. It was originally part of lot 17 purchased in 1815 by George Taylor Denison for the building of his new home "Belle Vue." The street is likely named for Richard Lippincott (Loyalist) who settled in then York. The residential street runs through present day Kensington Market, College Street, and Bloor Street. It includes a selection of Toronto architecture, such as Victorian worker's cottages, Toronto bay-and-gables, and more modern bungalows.

== Demographics ==
Census tracts 0059.00 and 0060.00 of the Canada 2011 Census cover Harbord Village. According to the Statistics Canada 2011, the neighbourhood has 3,794 residents, showing a constant decrease in the population. There are various ethnicity based immigrants present in the area, consisting mostly from Europe and East Asia. Out of the selected visible minority, there are 450 Chinese (11.86%), 55 Japanese (1.45%), and 30 Korean (0.79%). Average income is $44,082. The ten most common native languages, after English, are:

1. Portuguese - 6.35%
2. Spanish - 5.40%
3. Cantonese - 4.72%
4. Italian - 4.55%
5. Mandarin - 4.20%
6. German - 2.83%
7. Hebrew - 2.49%
8. Korean - 2.32%
9. Unspecified Chinese - 2.14%
10. Vietnamese - 1.29%

Harbord Village is a very diverse community. The total population in 2006 of census tract 5350059.00 was 3794. According to the 2006 census, of this population, 90 immigrants were from the United Kingdom, 300 immigrants were from the People's Republic of China, 50 immigrants were from the United States of America, and 20 immigrants that were from the Republic of South Africa. Additionally, the total population in 2011 of census tract 5350059.00 was 3,955. According to the 2011 NHS (with reference to GNR: 41.3%), 3,955 of this population, there were 55 immigrants that were from the United Kingdom, 220 immigrants that were from China, 105 immigrants that were from the United States, and 0 immigrants that were from the Republic of South Africa.

The Black population increased by 275%, going from 20 to 75 people from 2006 to 2011 respectively. The Latin American population increased by 66.67%, going from 15 to 25 people from 2006 to 2011, while the South Asian population went from 120 to 180 people which is an increase of 50%. The population of those with Chinese origin went from 555 to 450 people, a decrease of 18.92%.

Additionally, 40.8% of the population was 34 years old and younger in 2011, an increase from 28% in the 2006 Census (Statistics Canada, 2006 Census). Amongst those under 34, the age range of 30 to 34 experienced the greatest percentage increase of 65.22% between 2006 and 2011, in comparison to the age range of 25 to 29 which experienced a 65.22% decrease.

(Source: Census 2011, Census 2006, 2011 NHS.)

According to the 2011 NHS, the average income of Tract 0059.00 of residents who are 15-year old and over rose from $36,796 in 2006 to $45,792 in 2011 which is a higher rise than in Ontario or the whole of Canada. The average income of Ontario rose from $38,099 in 2006 to $42,264, and from $35,498 in 2006 to $40,650 in 2011 for the whole of Canada. This sharper rise is largely due to the fact that the segment earning $60,000 and more has virtually doubled between 2006 and 2011 which more than overcame the rise in individuals in the lowest income bracket of $5,000.

Income distribution in this tract is:

Income distribution
% Split by Income Level	2006	2011
Without Income	1.6%	1.4%
Under $5,000	12.3%	14.7%
$5,000 to $9,999	11.6%	5.5%
$10,000 to $14,999	13.9%	10.4%
$15,000 to $19,999	7.5%	9.8%
$20,000 to $29,999	15.2%	9.4%
$30,000 to $39,999	8.5%	7.7%
$40,000 to $49,999	7.4%	6.5%
$50,000 to $59,999	4.4%	4.5%
$60,000 and over	17.6%	30.1%

(Source: Census 2011, Census 2006, 2011 NHS.)
