= Tollkeeper's cottages in Ontario =

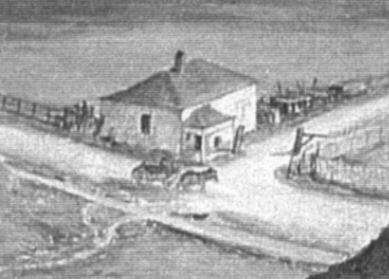
Tollkeeper's cottage, Davenport and Bathurst, Toronto, 1875.

In the 19th century small tollkeeper's cottages were built to house tollkeepers who collected tolls on the roads that lead into the city later known as Toronto, Ontario. Private companies were licensed to maintain the province's roads, and they were allowed to levy tolls from those traveling on the road to pay for their service. Tollkeepers were provided with cottages for remote work.

The first tollkeeper's cottage was built in 1820, at the corner of Yonge and King streets, when that intersection was on the outskirts of York, Upper Canada. The tollkeeper system was retired in 1896.

== The Tollkeeper's Park ==
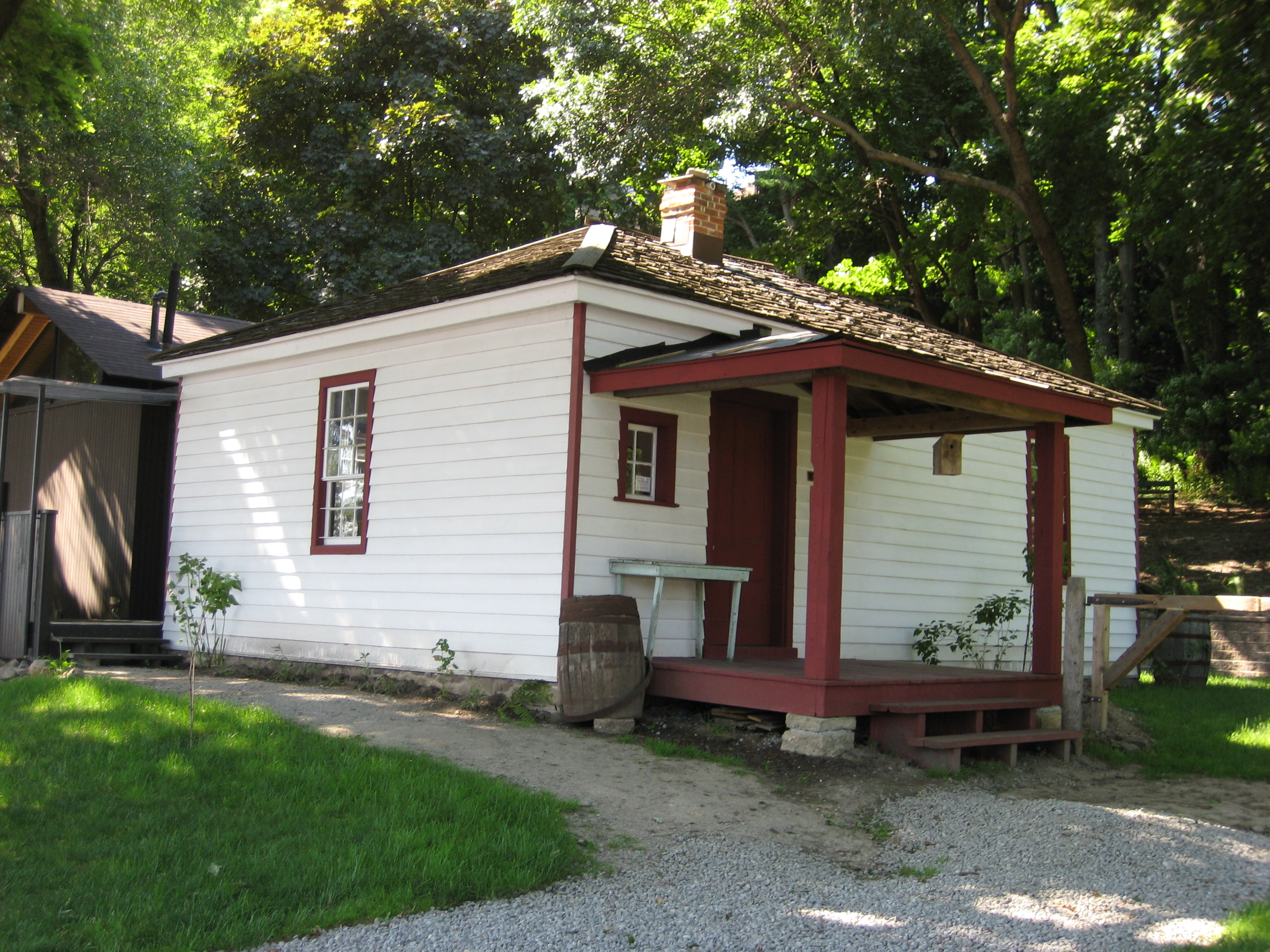
Tollkeeper's cottage, Davenport and Bathurst, after restoration.

In 1993 what had been tollhouse number 3, one of five tollhouses on Davenport Road was rediscovered. It had been moved, and repurposed, and was about to be demolished. After a long period of restoration it was turned into a museum, and turned into the centerpiece of a park, near its original location, at the corner of Davenport Road and Bathurst Street. The cottage located in The Tollkeeper's Park is the oldest tollkeeper cottage still standing.

John Allemang, writing in The Globe and Mail, contrasted the poverty of working class citizens, as documented by the cottage, to the luxury of the rich, as documented by two nearby former mansions, Casa Loma and Spadina House, now open to the public. Allemang wrote:

For visitors not entranced by the history of tolls or roads, by the lost stories of the city's French roots, or the shameful betrayals of the Mississauga Indians who once lived here, the cottage can offer up a revealing picture of lower-class existence in 19th-century Toronto. If Casa Loma and Spadina House on the brow of the escarpment represent the aristocratic Upstairs, the tollkeeper's three-room house, with unheated bedrooms where children would sleep three to a bed, is all too clearly Downstairs."
