= Parliament Interpretive Centre =

Coordinates: 43°39′4″N 79°21′49″W

The Parliament Interpretive Centre was an Ontario Heritage Trust museum in Toronto, Ontario, Canada. It was located at the site of the Upper Canada parliament buildings at Front Street and Berkeley Street.

The museum opened in February 2012. Much of the museum's displays focused on the War of 1812, and the burning of the Upper Canada legislature during the brief American occupation of York. The museum remained open throughout 2012, 2013, 2014, and into mid-2015 -- 200 years after the War of 1812, which ran from 1812 to 1815.

The building is currently rented to a car dealership, although the property is publicly owned. A final disposition for the site has not been made. Evidence of the parliament buildings was uncovered in 2000.

== External Pages ==
- Ontario Heritage Trust site on the Parliament interpretive centre
