= University, Toronto =

University
- Neighbourhood
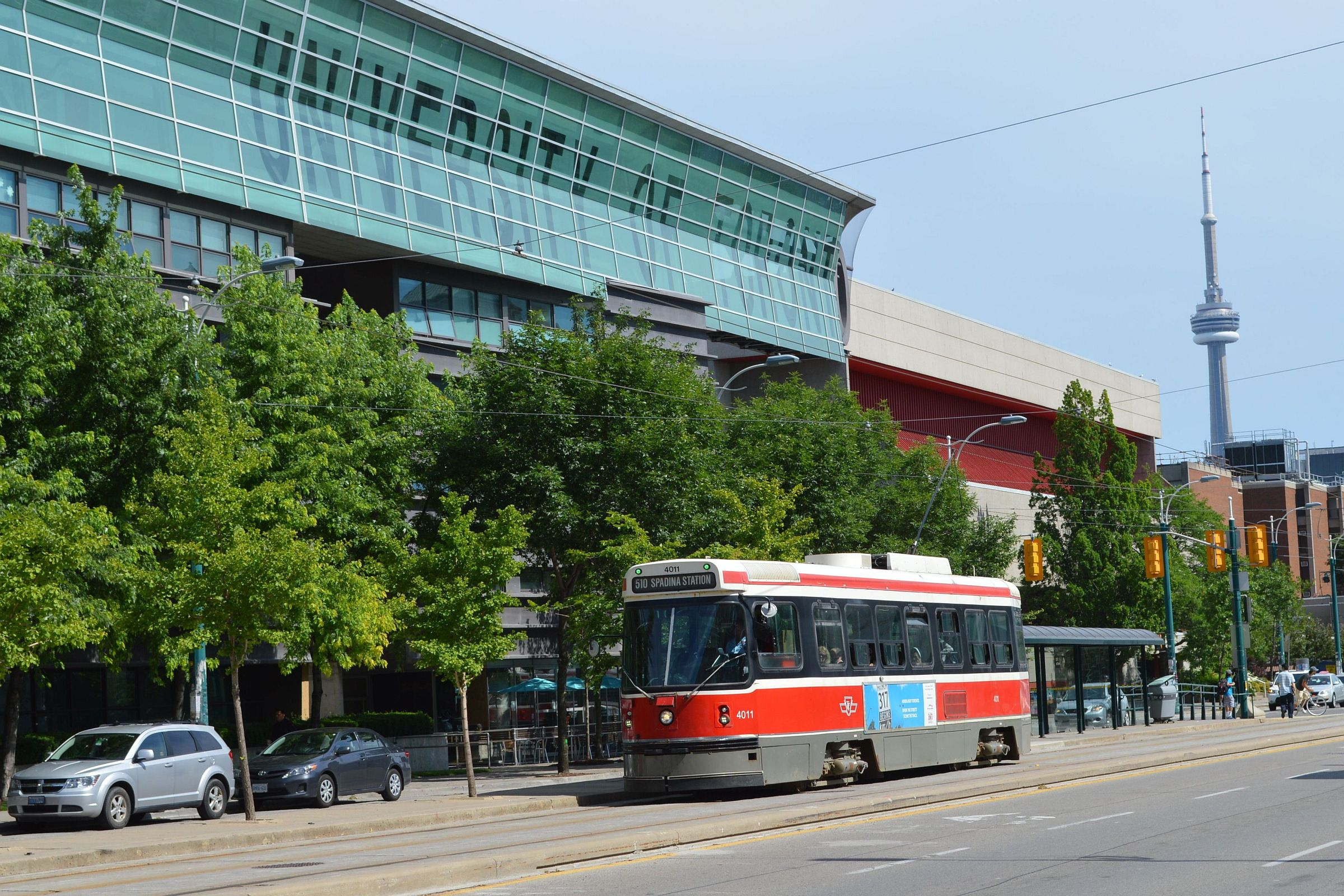
- Spadina Avenue through University in 2013

- Location within Toronto Location within Ontario Location within Canada
- Coordinates: 43°39′46″N 79°24′3″W
- Country: Canada
- Province: Ontario
- City: Toronto

Population (2016)
  - Total: 7,607
  - Density: 5,395/km^{2} (13,970/sq mi)

University is a neighbourhood in downtown Toronto, Ontario, Canada. It comprises the St. George campus of the University of Toronto and some of the surrounding area.

It is bounded by College Street to the south, Queen's Park to the east, Bloor Street West to the north, and Bathurst Street to the west.

The neighbourhood is represented by the riding of University—Rosedale in federal politics and a riding of the same name in provincial politics.

== Demographics ==
As of 2016, University had a population of 7,607 with a population density of 5,395 people per square kilometre. A plurality (50 per cent) of its residents were working age (aged 25 to 54) and its second-largest demographic (19 per cent) was youth aged 15 to 24.
