= Index of Toronto-related articles =

Articles related to Toronto include:

== 0–9 ==
- 509 Harbourfront
- 545 Lake Shore Boulevard West

== A ==
- Agincourt
- Alderwood
- Alexandra Park
- Allenby
- Amesbury
- Amsterdam Bridge
- The Annex
- Annual events in Toronto
- Armadale
- Armour Heights
- Art Gallery of Ontario

== B ==
- Baby Point
- Bata Shoe Museum
- Bathurst Manor
- Bayview Village
- Bayview Woods-Steeles
- Bead Hill
- The Beaches
- Bedford Park
- Bellevue Square
- Bendale
- Bermondsey
- Billy Bishop Toronto City Airport
- Billy Bishop Toronto City Water Aerodrome
- Birch Cliff
- Bloor GO Station
- Bloor Street Culture Corridor
- Bloor West Village
- Bloordale Village
- Bracondale Hill
- Bridle Path
- Brockton Village
- Brown's Corners

== C ==
- Cabbagetown
- Canada Malting Silos
- Caplansky's Delicatessen
- Captain John's Harbour Boat Restaurant
- Carleton Village
- Casa Loma
- Centreville Amusement Park
- Chaplin Estates
- Chinatown
- Chinatowns in Toronto
- Christie Pits
- Church and Wellesley
- CityPlace
- Clairlea
- Clairville
- Clanton Park
- Cliffcrest
- Cliffside
- Corktown
- Corso Italia
- Corso Italia-Davenport
- Crescent Town
- Crothers Woods
- Culture in Toronto

== D ==
- Davenport
- David A. Balfour Park
- Davisville Village
- Dean of Toronto
- Deer Park
- Discovery District
- Distillery District
- Don Mills
- Don River
- Don Valley Village
- Doors Open Toronto
- Dorset Park
- Downtown Yonge
- Dovercourt Park
- Downsview
- Dufferin Grove

== E ==
- Eatonville
- Earlscourt
- East Bayfront
- East Chinatown
- East Danforth
- East Toronto
- East York
- Eglinton, Ontario
- Eglinton Avenue
- Eglinton East
- Eglinton station
- Eglinton West
- The Elms
- Entertainment District
- Eringate-Centennial-West Deane
- Etobicoke
- Etobicoke Board of Education

== F ==
- Fairbank
- Fashion District
- Financial District
- Flemingdon Park
- Forest Hill
- Fort Rouillé
- Fort Toronto
- Fort York
- Fort York Armoury
- Fort York (neighbourhood)

== G ==
- Garden District
- Gerrard India Bazaar
- Geography of Toronto
- Gibraltar Point Lighthouse
- Glen Park
- GO Transit
- Golden Mile
- Governor's Bridge
- Grange Park
- Graydon Hall
- Greater Toronto Area
- Greektown
- Greenbelt (Golden Horseshoe)
- Guildwood

== H ==
- Ned Hanlan
- Hanlan's Point Beach
- Hanlan's Point Stadium
- Harbord Village
- Harbour Square Park
- Harbourfront
- Harbourfront Centre
- Hennick Humber Hospital
- Henry Farm
- High Park
- High Park North
- Highland Creek
- Hillcrest Village
- History of neighbourhoods in Toronto
- History of Toronto
- History of Toronto Island Airport
- Hoggs Hollow
- HTO Park
- Humber Bay
- Humber Heights-Westmount
- Humber Islands
- Humber Summit
- Humber River
- Humber Valley Village
- Humbermede
- Humberwood
- Humewood–Cedarvale

== I ==
- International Festival of Authors
- Ionview
- Ireland Park
- Island Public/Natural Science School
- Island Yacht Club
- Islington-City Centre West
- Islington station

== J ==
- Jack Layton Ferry Terminal
- James Gardens
- Jane and Finch
- The Junction
- Junction Triangle

== K ==
- Kensington Market
- King of Kensington
- Kingsview Village
- The Kingsway
- Koreatown

== L ==
- Lake Ontario
- Lambton
- L'Amoreaux
- Lansing
- Lawrence Heights
- Lawrence Manor
- Lawrence Park
- Leaside
- Leslie Street Spit
- Leslieville
- Liberty Village
- Little Italy
- Little Norway Park
- Little Tibet
- Long Branch
- Lytton Park

== M ==
- Malvern
- Maple Leaf, Toronto
- Maple Leaf Mills Silos
- Markland Wood
- Maryvale
- Media in Toronto
- Metrolinx
- Metropolitan Street Railway
- Midtown
- Milliken
- Mimico
- Moore Park
- Morningside
- Morningside Heights
- Moss Park
- Mount Dennis
- Museum station

== N ==
- New Toronto
- Newtonbrook
- Niagara, Toronto
- Nathan Phillips Square
- North Toronto
- North York
- North York City Centre
- No. 8 Hose Station

== O ==
- Oakridge
- Oakwood Village
- O'Connor–Parkview
- Old East York
- Old Mill
- Old Toronto
- Old Town
- Ontario Legislative Building

== P ==
- Palmerston-Little Italy
- Pape Village
- Parkdale
- Parkway Forest
- Parkwoods
- Pelmo Park-Humberlea
- Playter Estates
- Pleasant View
- Politics of Toronto
- Polson Iron Works Limited
- Port Lands
- Port Union
- The Power Plant
- Princess Gardens

== Q ==
- Quayside
- Queen City Yacht Club (Toronto)
- Queen Street West
- Queen's Park
- Queens Quay
- Queens Quay station
- Queen's Quay Terminal
- The Queensway-Humber Bay

== R ==
- Railway Lands
- Regent Park
- Rexdale
- Richview
- Riverdale
- Roncesvalles
- Rosedale
- Rouge
- Royal Canadian Yacht Club
- Royal Ontario Museum
- Rustic
- Runnymede

== S ==
- St. Andrew's Market and Playground
- St. James Town
- St. Lawrence
- Scarborough
- Scarborough Bluffs
- Scarborough City Centre
- Scarborough Junction
- Scarborough Village
- Seaton Village
- Sidewalk Toronto
- Silverthorn
- Simcoe Street Tunnel
- Smithfield
- Small's Pond
- South Core
- South Hill
- Southcore Financial Centre
- Spadina station
- Steeles (neighbourhood)
- Summerhill
- Superior Creek
- Swansea

== T ==
- Taber Hill
- Tam O'Shanter-Sullivan
- Teddington Park
- Teiaiagon
- This Ain't the Rosedale Library
- Thistletown
- Thistletown Collegiate Institute
- Thomson Memorial Park
- Thorncliffe Park
- Toronto
- Toronto Catholic District School Board
- Toronto Ferry Company
- Toronto Harbour
- Toronto Harbour Commission Building
- Toronto International Dragon Boat Race Festival
- Toronto International Film Festival
- Toronto Island ferries
- Toronto Islands
- Toronto Railway Museum
- Toronto ravine system
- Toronto streetcar system
- Toronto subway
- Toronto Transit Commission
- Toronto waterfront
- Trefann Court
- Trinity-Bellwoods
- Trolley buses in Toronto
- Twitch City

== U ==
- Union Station
- Upper Beaches
- Uptown Toronto

== V ==
- Vale of Avoca (bridge)
- Vale of Avoca (ravine)
- Victoria Village
- Videofag

== W ==
- Wallace Emerson
- Walter Carsen Centre
- The Ward
- Waterfront Toronto
- WaveDecks
- West Don Lands
- West Hill
- West Rouge
- Westin Harbour Castle Hotel
- Westminster-Branson
- Weston
- Wexford
- Willowdale
- Woburn
- Workmen's Compensation Board Building
- World Trade Centre Toronto
- Wychwood Park

== Y ==
- Yonge–Eglinton
- York
- York Mills
- York University Heights
- Yorkville

== See also ==
- Index of Ontario-related articles
