= List of oldest buildings and structures in Toronto =

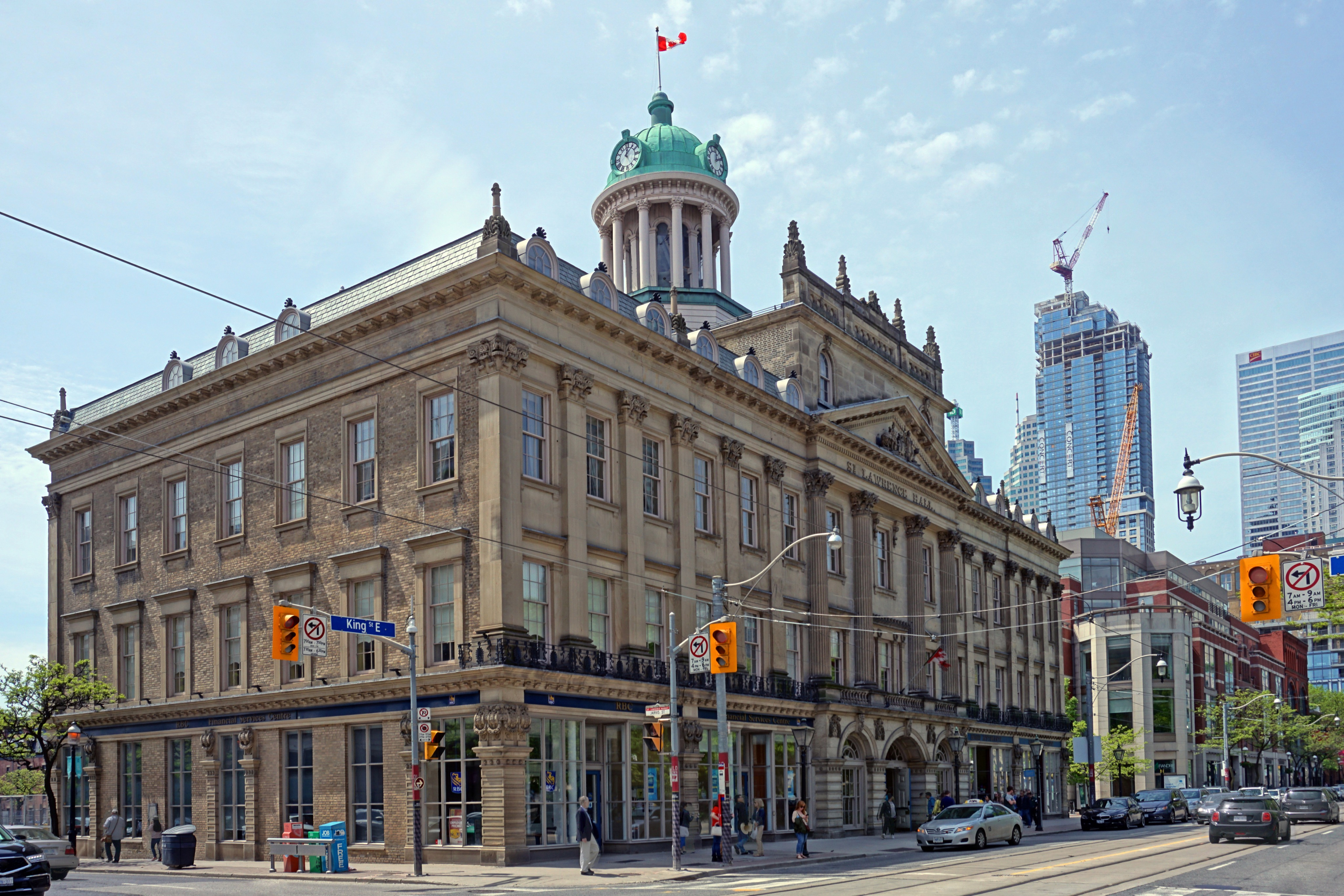
- St. Lawrence Hall (1850)

History of Toronto
- Events: Toronto Purchase; Founding of York; Battle of York; Battle of Montgomery's Tavern; Incorporation of Toronto
- Buildings: Oldest buildings; Lost buildings; National Historic Sites; Black Creek buildings; Great Fire 1849; Great Fire 1904

This is a list of the oldest buildings and structures in Toronto, that were constructed before 1870. This corresponds to the first 75 years since the founding of York. The history of Toronto dates back to Indigenous settlements in the region approximately 12,000 years ago. However, the oldest standing structures in Toronto were built by European settlers. Remains of a Seneca settlement exist at the federally protected Bead Hill archaeological site, in eastern Toronto.

The first structure built by Europeans in Toronto was Magasin Royal, a French trading post established in 1720. In the 1750s, the French built several structures in the area (including Fort Rouillé), although the French would later destroy them in 1759, following their defeat at the Battle of Fort Niagara. In 1793, the government of Upper Canada arranged for the purchase of Toronto from the Mississaugas in order to settle newly landed British American colonists Loyalists, who were exiled from the United States of America after the Revolutionary War. Many of Toronto's oldest structures date back to this early period of British settlement, when it was known as York. The town of York was formally incorporated as the City of Toronto in 1834, with the passage of the Incorporation of the City of Toronto Act.

== Surviving structures ==
The oldest intact structure of European settlement may be a piece of St Paul's Cathedral's courtyard railing dating from 1714, designed by Christopher Wren, that is now part of John Howard's tomb in High Park. Howard had it shipped from London in 1875.

The following list does not include structures where only the facade of the building has been preserved. It also does not include the collection of buildings and structures collected at The Village at Black Creek. Those are listed at List of Village at Black Creek buildings.

== Town of York era: 1794 to 1833 ==
Fort York was rebuilt after the original garrison was destroyed in the 1813 Battle of York. The site is a national historical site and its buildings, fortifications and cemetery are protected.

Building	Image	Year completed	Builder	Style	Address	Neighbourhood	District (Note: Districts in this instance refers to the lower-tier municipalities of Metro Toronto, an upper-tier municipality that was dissolved in 1998. The City of Toronto was formed after the six lower-tier municipalities of Metro Toronto amalgamated into a single entity in 1998. The City of Toronto government does not formally organize areas of the city by "districts.")	Ref.
Scadding Cabin		1794 (Note: Moved from original location on Don in 1879)	John Scadding	Log cabin	—N/a	Exhibition Place	Old Toronto	C, OTH
Lavinia Cottage		c. 1800–1819			23 Jason Road (Note: The physical address of the building is shared with other buildings)	Thistletown	Etobicoke	CoT, EHS, EYCPP
John Cox Cottage		1807 (Note: Addition in mid-1800s, addition late 19th-century)		Log cabin (renovated)	469 Broadview Avenue	Riverdale	Old Toronto	OTH, THR
Gibraltar Point Lighthouse		1809		British marine architecture	—N/a	Toronto Islands	Old Toronto	OTH
Fort York Blockhouse #1		1813	Royal Engineers	19th century blockhouse	100 Garrison Road (Fort York)	Fort York	Old Toronto	B
Fort York Blockhouse #2		1813	Royal Engineers	19th century blockhouse	100 Garrison Road (Fort York)	Fort York	Old Toronto	B
Fort York Brick Officers Barracks and Mess Room		1815 (Note: The building was enlarged in 1826)	Royal Engineers	19th century military architecture	100 Garrison Road (Fort York)	Fort York	Old Toronto	B
Fort York Brick Magazine		1815	Royal Engineers	19th century military architecture	100 Garrison Road (Fort York)	Fort York	Old Toronto	B
Fort York Stone Powder Magazine		1815	Royal Engineers	19th century military architecture	100 Garrison Road (Fort York)	Fort York	Old Toronto	B
Fort York Brick Barracks (Note: The Brick Barracks consists of two three-roomed structures)		1815	Royal Engineers	19th century military architecture	100 Garrison Road (Fort York)	Fort York	Old Toronto	B
The Grange		1817	D'Arcy Boulton	Georgian	317 Dundas Street West	Grange Park	Old Toronto	OTH
Robinson Log House		1820		Round-log house	83 Plymbridge Road	Bridle Path	North York	ACO, THR
Samuel and Ann Mercer House		c. 1820–1830	Samuel Mercer	Georgian	72 Old Burnhamthorpe Road	Eringate – Centennial – West Deane	Etobicoke	C, EHS EYCPP, THR
Campbell House		1822	William Campbell	Georgian	160 Queen Street West	Grange Park	Old Toronto	OTH, THR
William Moore House, Hedman House	white one storey building	1824-1840 (Note: wings added after 1835 for Hedman)	William Moore	Regency Cottage	171 Old Forest Hill Road	Forest Hill	Old Toronto	CoT, THR
John Bales House		c. 1824	John Bales		4169 Bathurst Street (Earl Bales Park)	Armour Heights	North York	THR
George S. Henry House (Oriole Lodge)		c. 1824	Stillwell Willson	19th century bungalow	17 Manorpark Court	Henry Farm	North York	THR
Todmorden Mills		1826		Industrial	67 Pottery Road	Old East York	East York	THR, OTH
Bank of Upper Canada Building		1827 (Note: Second Empire additions 1872-1877)	William Warren Baldwin	Neoclassical (with later Second Empire roof)	252 Adelaide Street East	Old Town	Old Toronto	THR
Richard Taylor House		1827		Farmhouse	2 Elgar Avenue	Eglinton East	Scarborough	THR
Snyder House		c. 1828 (Note: Second floor added in 1865)	William Snyder	Regency Cottage (later altered), Italianate	744 Duplex Avenue	Lytton Park		C, THR
Drumsnab House		1830 (Note: Altered in 1856 and 1908)	William Cayley, William Thomas (1856), Eden Smith (1908)	Regency Cottage (later altered)	5 Drumsnab Road	Rosedale	Old Toronto	THR
Hart House, Jacob Snider House		c. 1830 (Note: First floor only)			35 Nelson Road	York University Heights	North York	ACO, THR
Parshall Terry House		c. 1830		Regency Cottage	67 Pottery Road (Todmorden Mills)	Old East York	East York	C,ACO
29 Jarvis Street		c. 1830s–1840s			29 Jarvis Street	Old Town	Old Toronto	THR
Thomas and Catherine Snider House	brown brick one-storey building	c. 1831	Thomas and Catherine Snider		519 Glengrove Avenue West	Glen Park	North York	THR
Montgomery's Inn		1832		Georgian	4709 Dundas Street West	The Kingsway	Etobicoke	EHS, EYCPP
Osgoode Hall		1832	John Ewart and William Warren Baldwin	Neoclassical and Palladian	130 Queen Street West	Discovery District	Old Toronto	OTH
Roman Catholic Bishop's residence		1832			113 Jarvis Street	Old Town	Old Toronto	THR
Bishop's Block Row Houses/Pretzel Bell Tavern		1833			192 Adelaide Street West	Entertainment District	Old Toronto	M, THR
Fourth York Post Office		1833	James Scott Howard	Georgian	260 Adelaide Street East	Old Town	Old Toronto	THR
Daniel Brooke Building		1833		Georgian	150-154 King Street East	Old Town	Old Toronto	THR
C. W. Jeffreys House		c. 1833		Ontario Cottage	4111 Yonge Street	York Mills	North York	THR
Thomas Thompson Building		1833	David B. Dick		185 King Street East	Old Town	Old Toronto	SLHCD
Upper Canada College boarding houses		c. 1833 (Note: Building was renovated in 1856)			20 Duncan Street	Entertainment District	Old Toronto	THR

== Toronto ==
The new City of Toronto came into existence on January 1, 1834.

=== 1834-1849 ===
Building	Image	Year completed	Builder	Style	Address	Neighbourhood	District	Ref.
Elihu Pease House		1834		Ontario Cottage	20 Harrison Garden Boulevard	Willowdale	North York	CoT
Elm Bank Farm Second House		1834	John Grubb		19 Jason Road	Thistletown	Etobicoke	CoT. EYCPP
Grubb Farm barn		1835	John Grubb		32 Jason Road	Thistletown	Etobicoke	EYCPP
Grubb Farm piggery		1835	John Grubb		34 Jason Road	Thistletown	Etobicoke	EYCPP
Holley House / Inverary Cottage		1835			6 Humberview Crescent	Weston	York	EYCPP
Joseph Shepard House		c. 1835			90 Burndale Avenue	Lansing	North York	CoT
Tollkeepers' Cottage Museum		1835			750 Davenport Road	Wychwood Park	Old Toronto	ACO, THR
Colborne Lodge		1836	John George Howard	Regency Cottage (later altered)	11 Colborne Lodge Drive	High Park	Old Toronto	CoT
167–169 King Street East		1836			167–169 King Street East	Old Town	Old Toronto	SLHCD
171 King Street East		c. 1836	Jacob Latham	Georgian	171 King Street East	Old Town	Old Toronto	THR
Helliwell House		1837 (Note: 1848 repairs/reconstruction due to fire)		Adobe Brick	67 Pottery Road (Todmorden Mills)	Old East York	East York	ACO, C,
The Black Bull		1838 (Note: Rebuilt in 1886)		Victorian	298 Queen Street West	Grange Park	Old Toronto	THR, OTH
Guildwood Gates (formerly the Gates of New Fort York)		1839			Northern entrance of Guildwood Parkway	Guildwood	Scarborough	OTH
Elizabeth Harrison House		1839			111 Harrison Road	York Mills	North York	THR
Springfield Farmhouse		1839	James Thomson		146 St. Andrews Road	Bendale	Scarborough	OTH
William Gray First House		1839			1413 Don Mills Road	Don Mills	North York	THR
553 Adelaide Street East		1840, expanded 1870, 1930		Industrial	553 Adelaide Street East	Old Town	Old Toronto	THR
20 Beechwood Crescent		1840	George Taylor		20 Beechwood Crescent	Old East York	East York	OTH, THR
22 Beechwood Crescent		1840	George Taylor		22 Beechwood Crescent	Old East York	East York	THR
94,98,100 Front Street East		1840			94, 98, 100 Front Street East	Old Town	Old Toronto	SLHCD, THR
Bigham-Agar Homestead		ca. 1840		Saltbox house	190 Rathburn Road	Princess Gardens	Etobicoke	EHS, EYCPP, THR
Christian Reesor House		1840			8327 Steeles Avenue East	Rouge	Scarborough	THR
William Hume Blake House (Woodlawn)		1840 (Note: Addition built in 1895)	John George Howard		35 Woodlawn Avenue West	Summerhill	Old Toronto	CoT, THR, OTH
Thornbeck-Bell House		c. 1840s		Georgian	80 Bell Estate Road	Scarborough Junction	Scarborough	CoT
Scott House		1841			520 Progress Avenue	Scarborough City Centre	Scarborough	OTH, THR
Stanley Barracks Officers' Quarters		1841		19th century military architecture	115 Princes' Boulevard	Exhibition Place	Old Toronto	OTH, THR
Weston Plank Road Co.	two-storey brown brick building	1841			2371 Weston Road	Weston	York	EYCPP, THR
105-109 King Street East		1842	William Thomas	Georgian Revival	105,107,109 King Street East	St. Lawrence	Old Toronto	SLHCD, THR
111 King Street East		1842	William Thomas		111 King Street East	St. Lawrence	Old Toronto	SLHCD, THR
125 King Street		1842	William Thomas	Georgian Revival	125 King Street East	St. Lawrence	Old Toronto	SLHCD, THR
City Building		1842, altered 1887	William Thomas, Langley and Burke (1887)		133, 135 King Street East	St. Lawrence	Old Toronto	THR
Albany Club (originally Victoria Row)		1842	John George Howard		91 King Street East	St. Lawrence	Old Toronto	SLHCD
Paul Bishop Houses		1842			363–365 Adelaide Street East	Old Town	Old Toronto	SLHCD, THR
173 King Street E		1843	Jacob Latham	Georgian Revival	173 King Street East	Old Town	Old Toronto	SLHCD
175–179 King Street E		1843	Jacob Latham	Georgian Revival	175–179 King Street East	Old Town	Old Toronto	SLHCD
Etobicoke Township Hall		1843		Georgian Revival	4946 Dundas Street West	Islington–City Centre West	Etobicoke	EHS, THR
John Perkins Bull House		1843		Georgian Revival	450 Rustic Road	Maple Leaf	North York	EYCPP
Little Trinity Anglican Church		1843	Henry Bowyer Lane	Gothic Revival	425 King Street East	Corktown	Old Toronto	PC
Farnham Lodge (Edward Hooper House)		1844 (Note: Altered in 1910)			50 Farnham Avenue	Deer Park	Old Toronto	THR, OTH
Farnham Lodge (Coach house)		1844			50 Farnham Avenue	Deer Park	Old Toronto	OTH
James Coulter House	small white wood one-storey building	1844			63 George Street	Weston	York	EYCPP
St. John's Anglican Church		1844		Gothic Revival	19 Don Ridge Drive	York Mills	North York	OHT
St. George's on-the-Hill Anglican Church		1844 (Note: Dedicated in 1847)			4600 Dundas St. West	Humber Valley Village	Etobicoke	EYCPP, OTH
St. Lawrence Market Square Gallery (originally Toronto City Hall)	three storey brick building	1844	John Wilson Siddall	Gothic Revival and Second Empire	95 Front Street East	St. Lawrence	Old Toronto	SLHCD
Bell Estate		1845		Georgian Revival	671–679 Warden Avenue	Scarborough Junction	Scarborough	THR
Charles Coxwell Small House		1845	Charles Coxwell Small		298–300 King Street East	Old Town	Old Toronto	SLHCD
James Vance/Sheldon Ward House		1845 (Note: Altered in 1881)			115–117 Berkeley Street	Old Town	Old Toronto	ACO, M
Methodist Episcopal Church Oddfellows Hall		1845			24 Church Street	Weston	York	EYCPP
St. George the Martyr Church clock tower		1845	Henry Bowyer Lane	Gothic Revival	197 John Street	Grange Park	Old Toronto	OTH
Osterhout Log Cabin		c. 1845 (Note: Actual date of construction is unknown. Local lore suggests the building was erected c. 1795 by Augustus Jones, though studies on the site in 1996 suggests the building was erected in c. 1845 by James Humphreys.)	Augustus Jones	Log cabin	201 Guildwood Parkway (Guild Park and Gardens)	Guildwood	Scarborough	OTH
Bishop's Palace of St. Michael's Cathedral		1846	William Thomas	Gothic Revival	200 Church Street	Garden District	Old Toronto	THR
Henry Hough Carriage Works		1846	Henry Hough		1007 Brimley Road (Thomson Memorial Park)	Bendale	Scarborough	THR
Church of the Holy Trinity		1847	Henry Bowyer Lane	Gothic Revival	19 Trinity Square	Downtown Yonge	Old Toronto	OHT
Farr House		1847			905 Queen Street West	Niagara	Old Toronto	C, GO
254 King Street East		1847			254 King Street East (Note: Incorporated into a complex addressed as 260 King Street East.)	Old Town	Old Toronto	SLHCD
I. A. Smith House		1847 (Note: Remodeled in 1885)			70 Gerrard Street East	Garden District	Old Toronto	THR
Morley Cottage	one-storey brick building	1847		Regency	66 Rosemount Avenue	Weston	York	EYCPP
William Noble's Tavern		1847		Second Empire	252-260 King Street East	Old Town	Old Toronto	THR
51 Yonge Street		1847	A.V. Brown (John Howard, architect)	Second Empire	51 Yonge Street	St. Lawrence	Old Toronto	CoT
97 Granby Street		1848			97 Granby Street	Garden District	Old Toronto	THR
Church of St. Jude		1848		Carpenter Gothic	10 Howarth Avenue	Wexford	Scarborough	OTH
Edward Guardhouse Residence		1848			1755 Steeles Avenue West (Connaught Laboratories)	Westminster–Branson	North York	THR
Enoch Turner School		1848	Enoch Turner		106 Trinity Street	Corktown	Old Toronto	OHT
Hoover House		1848	Abraham Hoover		10 Hoover Road	York University Heights	North York	CoT
Oakham House		1848	William Thomas	Gothic Revival	322 Church Street	Garden District	Old Toronto	OTH
St. Michael's Cathedral Basilica		1848	William Thomas	English Gothic	65 Bond Street	Garden District	Old Toronto	OTH
Thomson Bonese House		1848 (Note: Remodelled in 1896)	William Thomson		1 St. Andrews Road	Bendale	Scarborough	THR
Toronto House of Industry (now YWCA Leadership Centre)		1848	William Thomas; E.J. Lennox (1899 third floor)		85 Elm Street	Discovery District	Old Toronto	OTH
33 Jarvis Street	three storey brick building with store on first floor	1849			33 Jarvis Street	Old Town	Old Toronto	SLHCD
St. Andrew's Presbyterian Church		1849			115 St. Andrews Road	Bendale	Scarborough	CE
The Wheat Sheaf		1849 (Note: The building's third floor was added to the building in 1905.)			667 King Street West	Niagara	Old Toronto	OTH

=== 1850 to 1859 ===
Building	Image	Year completed	Builder	Style	Address	Neighbourhood	District	Source
16 Church Street (Weston)		1850			16 Church Street	Weston	York	THR
80 Church Street		1850			80 Church Street	St. Lawrence	Old Toronto	SLHCD
Devonsleigh Place (Hood-Gough House)		1850			4125 Steeles Avenue East	Steeles	Scarborough	THR
Dixon Hall Centre		1850			192 Carlton St	Garden District	Old Toronto	THR
Moore House		1850	William Tyrrell	Georgian	18 Great Oak Drive	Princess Gardens	Etobicoke	EYCPP, THR, ACO
Newborn Farmhouse	stone one storey building with veranda	1850		Gothic Revival cottage	28 Daisy Avenue	Long Branch	Etobicoke	EYCPP, THR, ACO
St. Lawrence Hall		1850	William Thomas	Renaissance Revival	157 King Street East	St. Lawrence	Old Toronto	PC, THR
St. Lawrence Galleries		1850		Georgian Revival	142 King Street East	Old Town	Old Toronto	SLHCD
Toronto Baptist Seminary (Samuel Platt House)	white brick house	1850			337 Jarvis Street	Garden District	Old Toronto	CoT
William Goodwin House		c. 1850			355 Lesmill Road	Graydon Hall	North York	CoT
William Gray Second House		c. 1850			1413 Don Mills Road	Don Mills	North York	ACO
Forest Home		1851		Farmhouse	42–44 Macklingate Court	Agincourt	Scarborough	C
Gibson House		1851	David Gibson	Georgian	5172 Yonge Street	Willowdale	North York	C, THR
La Rose House		1851	Daniel and Caroline La Rose	Georgian	322 La Rose Avenue	Richview	Etobicoke	C, EYCPP
Melville Church		1851			70 Old Kingston Road	West Hill	Scarborough	ACO
191,193,197 Church Street		1852	John Tully	Georgian Revival	191,193,197 Church Street	Garden District	Old Toronto	C
1192 Queen St. East		1852		Commercial	1192 Queen St. East	Leslieville	Old Toronto	THR
Adelaide Street Court House		1852	Frederick William Cumberland and Thomas Ridout	Greek Revival	57 Adelaide Street East	St. Lawrence	Old Toronto	SLHCD
Consumers' Gas Building		1852	Frederick William Cumberlandand Thomas Ridout	Renaissance Revival	17–25 Toronto Street	St. Lawrence	Old Toronto	SLHCD
Herod & Mary Noble's Market Garden		1852			35 Daniels Street	The Queensway – Humber Bay	Etobicoke	EHS, EYCPP
Jacob P. Ross House		1852	Jacob P. Ross		108 Stayner Avenue	Glen Park	North York	OHT
Neurologic Rehabilitation Institute of Ontario		1852		Georgian Revival (front portico and siding added after 1939)	59 Beaver Bend Crescent	Eringate – Centennial – West Deane	Etobicoke	OTH
Benjamin Parker House	small wooden one-storey house	1853			66 George Street	Weston	York	EYCPP
William Galbraith House		1853			37 Maitland Street	Church and Wellesley	Old Toronto	ACO
William Hannah House		1853			36 Metcalfe Street	Cabbagetown	Old Toronto	ACO, THR
Little Trinity Church Rectory		1853			417 King Street East	Corktown	Old Toronto	ACO
Alexander Muirhead Farm House		1853		Farm house	179 Old Sheppard Avenue	Pleasant View	North York	THR
Cathedral Church of St. James		1853, additions 1874	Frederick William Cumberland and Thomas Ridout	Gothic Revival	65 Church St, 106 King St E, 185 Adelaide St E	Old Town	Old Toronto	SLHCD, THR
St. James' Parish Hall & Diocesan Centre		1853, addition 1901	Frederick William Cumberland and Thomas Ridout	Gothic Revival	125 Adelaide St. East	Old Town	Old Toronto	SLHCD, THR
Toronto Street Post Office		1853	Frederick William Cumberlandand Thomas Ridout	Greek Revival	10 Toronto Street	St. Lawrence	Old Toronto	SLHCD
P. J. O'Brien Pub		1854		Commercial warehouse	39 Colborne Street	St. Lawrence	Old Toronto	SLHCD
Ashbridge Estate		1854			1444 Queen Street East	Leslieville	Old Toronto	ACO
Clairville Tollhouse		1854			2095 Codlin Crescent	Clairville	Etobicoke	EYCPP
Jacob Stong House		1854	Jacob Strong	Victorian	4700 Keele Street	York University Heights	North York	ACO, OTH
Jacob Stong Barn		1854	Jacob Strong		4700 Keele Street	York University Heights	North York	ACO, OTH
Paul Kane House		1854	Paul Kane		56 Wellesley Street East	Church and Wellesley	Old Toronto	ACO, THR
Thomas Clark House		1854		Upright and Wing	9 Barberry Place	Bayview Village	North York	THR
5 Old Yonge Street		1854			5 Old Yonge Street	York Mills	North York	ACO
Little Trinity Annex		1854			399–403 King Street East	Corktown	Old Toronto	ACO
Esten House		1854	James Grand		106 Beverley Street	Grange Park	Old Toronto	ACO
Hutchison Building		1854			36–42 Wellington Street East	St. Lawrence	Old Toronto	SLHCD
62–66 Gerrard St. East		1855 (Note: additions in 1875)		Georgian Revival	62–66 Gerrard St. East	Garden District	Old Toronto	ACO, M, THR
181–183 King Street East		1855		Georgian Revival	181–183 King Street East	Old Town	Old Toronto	SLHCD
O'Keefe House		1855		Victorian	137 Bond Street	Garden District,	Old Toronto	THR
Rowland Burr House		1855			56 King Street	Weston	York	EYCPP
Shaw House		1855			8 William Street	Weston	York	EYCPP
139–141 Berkeley Street		pre-1856		Terrace	139–141 Berkeley Street	Moss Park	Old Toronto	ACO, THR
Allandale		1856	Enoch Turner		241 Sherbourne Street	Cabbagetown	Old Toronto	C
William Hall House		1856	William Hall		77 Seaton Street	Cabbagetown	Old Toronto	THR
John Street Worker's Cottages (now Auberge du Pommier)		1856			4150 Yonge Street	Armour Heights	North York	THR
Northfield Estate (presently a part of Canada's National Ballet School)		1856	Joseph Sheard		372 Jarvis Street	Church and Wellesley	Old Toronto	ACO, THR
St. Basil's Church		1856	William Hay		50 St Joseph Street	Discovery District	Old Toronto	THR
Old University of St. Michael's College		1856	William Hay		50 St Joseph Street	Discovery District	Old Toronto	OTH
St. Michael's Cemetery Mortuary Vault		1856			1414 Yonge Street	Deer Park	Old Toronto	ACO, THR, OTH
Salvation Army Rest Home (former)		1856			297 George Street	Garden District	Old Toronto	CoT
Weston CNR bridge		1856	Sir Cazimir Gzowski for Grand Trunk Railway		Over the Humber River (west of Weston Road and St. Phillips Street)	Weston	York	OTH
85 Winchester Street		1857		Georgian Revival	85 Winchester Street	Cabbagetown	Old Toronto	ACO
Davis House (also Geary House "Caverhill")		1857	James Boyd Davis	Regency	124 Park Road	Rosedale	Old Toronto	ACO, C, SRHCD
William Devenish House		1857			1355 Victoria Park Avenue	Clairlea	Scarborough	THR
Mackenzie House		1857	William Rogers	Georgian	82 Bond Street	Garden District	Old Toronto	C, THR
Miller Tavern		1857			3885 Yonge Street	York Mills	North York	THR
John B. Reid House		1857	John Tully	Greek Revival	24 Mercer Street	Entertainment District	Old Toronto	ACO
Ritchie/Forneri House		1857			283–285 Sherbourne Street	Cabbagetown	Old Toronto	M
Henry Scadding House		1857			6 Trinity Square	Downtown Yonge	Old Toronto	ACO, THR
Hiram Piper & Brother Building		1857 (Note: 1895 addition by C.J. Gibson; altered 1910 by Hand, Harris & Merritt; altered 1914 by Hand, Harris & Merritt)	Joseph Sheard		83 Yonge Street	St. Lawrence	Old Toronto	ACO, THR
James Small House		1857		Second Empire	281 Sherbourne Street (Note: altered 1974-75 by Diamond & Myers) part of 251 Sherbourne complex	Cabbagetown	Old Toronto	GDHCD, THR
Peter Hutty House	one storey red brick house	1857			69 John Street (Weston)	Weston	York	EYCPP
Toronto Magnetic and Meteorological Observatory		1857	Frederick William Cumberlandand William George Storm		12 Hart House Circle	University	Old Toronto	ACO, THR
510 Church Street		1858			510 Church Street	Church-Wellesley	Old Toronto	THR
308 Gerrard St East		1858	John Carruthers	Second Empire	308 Gerrard St East	Cabbagetown	Old Toronto	ACO
Armoury Hotel		1858	William Cayley		10–12 Market Street	St. Lawrence	Old Toronto	SLHCD
Rev. Samuel Boddy House		1858			21 Winchester Street	Cabbagetown	Old Toronto	ACO
Mary Curts House		1858			57 Church Street	Weston	York	EYCPP
Dunn Cottage		pre-1858		Regency Cottage	135A Berkeley Street	Moss Park	Old Toronto	ACO
Felix Kent House		1858			51 Church Street	Weston	York	EYCPP
McCowan's Log Cabin		1858		Log cabin	1007 Brimley Road (Thomson Memorial Park)	Bendale	Scarborough	OTH, THR
Thomas Clarkson Building/John Hallam Building		1858 (Note: Mansard roof added in 1871)		Renaissance Revival	85 Front Street East	St. Lawrence	Old Toronto	SLHCD
Cornell House		1858		Upright and Wing	1007 Brimley Road (Thomson Memorial Park)	Bendale	Scarborough	THR
Culloden		1858			291 Sherbourne Street	Cabbagetown	Old Toronto	ACO, M
Francey Barn		1858			201 Winchester Street (Riverdale Farm)	Cabbagetown	Old Toronto	ACO
Green House		1858		Georgian Revival	78–80 Gerrard Street East	Garden District	Old Toronto	M
Thomas Helliwell Block		1858		Georgian Revival	81 Front Street East	St. Lawrence	Old Toronto	SLHCD
Hughes Terrace		1858			319–325 King Street West	Entertainment District	Old Toronto	ACO
John Kestevan House		1858			56 Rose Avenue [Cabbagetown	Old Toronto	ACO	
Edward Leadlay Company		1858 (Note: Modified in 1917 and 1973)		Georgian Revival	87 Front Street East	St. Lawrence	Old Toronto	SLHCD
St. James The Less Chapel		1858	Frederick William Cumberlandand William George Storm	Gothic Revival	635 Parliament Street	Cabbagetown	Old Toronto	CNHCD, THR
St. Stephen-in-the-Fields Anglican Church		1858 (rebuilt 1865)	Thomas Fuller	Gothic Revival	103 Bellevue Avenue	Kensington Market	Old Toronto	ACO, THR
H. S. Strathy House		1858 (Note: mansard roof added in 1876; street level store added in 1912)		Second Empire	342 Adelaide Street West	Entertainment District	Old Toronto	ACO
252 Queen St East (Kim's Convenience)	store building	1859		Commercial	252 Queen St East	Moss Park	Old Toronto	ACO, THR
Bain House		1859	Robert Sargant	Farmhouse	14 Dingwall Avenue	Riverdale	Old Toronto	C
Michael Shepard House / York Cemetery office		1859			101 Senlac/ 160 Beecroft	Willowdale	North York	THR
Tyrell House (also Brick House)		1859	William Tyrell		64 King Street (Weston)	Weston	York	EYCPP, THR
Cherry Street Hotel		1859 (Note: originally Palace Street School, 1859, Joseph Sheard, architect; 1869 addition, William Irving, architect; 1890, addition for D'Arcy Hotel, David Roberts Jr., architect; 1891, addition completed by Sproatt and Rolph, architects; 1906, became Cherry Street Hotel)	Joseph Sheard		409 Front Street East	West Don Lands	Old Toronto	ACO, THR
Thomas Meredith House		1859			305 George Street	Garden District	Old Toronto	ACO
Robertson Cottages		1859			703–705,719–721 Richmond Street West	Niagara	Old Toronto	ACO, THR
Robinson Cottages		1859	James Lukin Robinson		71-75 Mitchell Ave	Niagara	Old Toronto	THR
University College Main Building		1859	Frederick William Cumberlandand William George Storm; David Dick (1892)	Norman Romanesque Revival	15 King's College Circle (University College)	University	Old Toronto	THR
University College Croft House		1859	Frederick William Cumberland		15 King's College Circle (University College)	University	Old Toronto	THR
Workers' Cottages		1859			7–9 Government Road	The Kingsway	Etobicoke	EYCPP
Applewood, The Shaver Homestead		c. 1850s			450 The West Mall	Eatonville	Etobicoke	THR
Newtonbrook Store		c. 1850s			5926 Yonge Street	Newtonbrook	North York	THR
191–197 Church Street (Note: A fire destroyed 195 Church Street in 1981, although the building was rebuilt based on the building's original design.)		c. 1850s	John Tully		191–197 Church Street	Garden District	Old Toronto	OTH

=== 1860 to 1869 ===
Building	Image	Year completed	Builder	Style	Address	Neighbourhood	District	Source
Graham House		1860 (Note: Modified by Langley & Burke 1884-1885)			72–74 Gerrard Street East	Garden District	Old Toronto	THR
136–140 Seaton Street		1860		Georgian townhouses	136–140 Seaton Street	Cabbagetown	Old Toronto	ACO
Ardenvohr		1860			177 Balmoral Avenue	South Hill	Old Toronto	ACO
St. Paul's, Bloor Street		1860	Edward and George Radford		227 Bloor Street East	Church and Wellesley	Old Toronto	ACO
Thomas Bonner house		1860			47 Granby Street	Garden District	Old Toronto	THR
Dempsey Store		1860			250 Beecroft Road	Willowdale	North York	THR
Garbutt-Gardhouse Residence		1860			105 Elmhurst Drive	Humberwood	Etobicoke	EYCPP, THR
Garibaldi House		1860			302 King Street East	Old Town	Old Toronto	ACO
Oaklands (John Macdonald House) Later De La Salle College		1860	William Hay (architect)	Victorian	131 Farnham Avenue	Summerhill	Old Toronto	C, OTH
John Richardson House		1860		Georgian	27 Old Kingston Road	West Hill	Scarborough	ACO, C
Jared Sessions House		1860			34 Isabella Street	Church and Wellesley	Old Toronto	ACO
Spring Bank (Archibald & Mary Thompson House)		1860		Regency	7 Meadowcrest Road	The Queensway – Humber Bay	Etobicoke	EYCPP
William Kent House		1860			54 Church Street (Weston)	Weston	York	EYCPP
Josiah Parker House	two storey brick house with front porch	1860			25 Queens Drive	Weston	York	EYCPP
Lambton House		1860			4062 Old Dundas Street West	Lambton	York	EYCPP
Cumberland House (Pendarvis)		1860	John W. Cumberland	Eclectic	33 St. George Street 184-200 College Street	University	Old Toronto	C, OTH, THR
Alexander Smith Block		1861			77 Front Street East	St. Lawrence	Old Toronto	SLHCD
Charles MacKay House		1861	Charles MacKay		35 Spruce Street	Cabbagetown	Old Toronto	ACO, C, CSHCD, THR
Francis & Susan Daniels House		1861 (Note: Original wing built in 1861, followed by a new front wing in 1890, when the house was enclosed in brick)			82 Daniels Street	The Queensway – Humber Bay	Etobicoke	EHS, EYCPP
Gooderham and Worts Distillery Stone Distillery		1861		Victorian	42 Mill Street	Distillery District	Old Toronto	ACO, OTH, THR
James Weir House		1861			1021 Tapscott Road	Amadale	Scarborough	ACO
Queen's Wharf Lighthouse		1861			—N/a	Fort York	Old Toronto	CoT
William Stonehouse House		1861			5951 Steeles Avenue East	Armadale	Scarborough	THR
Chapel of Ease, St. John's Anglican Church; Bin Abbas Mosque		1861			2125 Weston Road	Weston	York	EYCPP
240 King Street East		1862			240 King Street East	Old Town	Old Toronto	SLHCD
Holy Trinity Rectory		1862	William Hay		10 Trinity Square	Downtown Yonge	Old Toronto	THR
Heyroyd		1862		Georgian Revival	35 Sherbourne Street North	Rosedale	Old Toronto	ACO
Piper/Birnie House		1862		Georgian Revival	110–112 Bond Street	Garden District	Old Toronto	ACO
Alfred Walton Stores		1862			374 Yonge Street	Downtown Yonge	Old Toronto	ACO
George Arthur House		1863			433–435 Sackville Street	Cabbagetown	Old Toronto	ACO, THR
Frederick Bell-Smith House		1863			336 Jarvis Street	Church and Wellesley	Old Toronto	ACO
John Kerr House and Store		1863			324–326 Queen Street West	Grange Park	Old Toronto	THR
Rev. William McClure House		1863			306 Seaton Street	Cabbagetown	Old Toronto	ACO
Betty Oliphant Theatre (formerly Blaikie/Alexander House)	large red brick house	1863	Thomas Gundry		404 Jarvis Street	Church and Wellesley	Old Toronto	ACO
Snarr's Terrace		1863	Thomas Snarr	Georgian	215,217,219 Jarvis Street	Cabbagetown	Old Toronto	ACO, C, THR
230–232 Carlton Street		1864			230,232 Carlton Street	Cabbagetown	Old Toronto	ACO
Don Jail		1864	William Thomas	Italianate	550 Gerrard Street East	Riverdale	Old Toronto	THR
Elderslie		1864		Georgian	1575 Neilson Road	Malvern	Scarborough	C, THR
Gooderham & Worts Distillery Brick Malthouse		1864			55 Mill Street	Distillery District	Old Toronto	ACO, THR
John Wanless Building		1864			372 Yonge Street	Downtown Yonge	Old Toronto	ACO, THR
Joshua J. Williams Stores		1864			328–330 Queen Street West	Grange Park	Old Toronto	THR
John McBean Building		1864	John McBean		376 Yonge Street	Downtown Yonge	Old Toronto	ACO, THR
Davis House		1865			66 Millwood Road	Davisville Village	Old Toronto	ACO, THR
David Duncan House (Moatfield)		1865		Victorian farmhouse	125 Moatfield Drive	Graydon Hall	North York	C, THR
Edward Scarlett House		1865			1 Heritage Place	Humber Heights – Westmount	Etobicoke	EYCPP
Forsyth House	two storey brick house with peak roof	1865			17 Queens Drive	Weston	York	EYCPP
Laver House		c. 1865			1671 Kipling Avenue	Richview	Etobicoke	THR
Milne House		1865	Alexander Milne		1185 Lawrence Avenue East	Victoria Village	North York	THR
320–322 Queen Street West		1865			320–322 Queen Street West	Grange Park	Old Toronto	ACO, THR
Rectory of St. George the Martyr		1865			205 John Street	Grange Park	Old Toronto	ACO, THR
91 Seaton Street		1865			91 Seaton Street	Cabbagetown	Old Toronto	ACO, THR
Sheard House	yellow brick house with large veranda	1865			314 Jarvis Street	Garden District	Old Toronto	ACO, THR
Summer Hill Coach House		1865			38 Summerhill Gardens	Summerhill	Old Toronto	ACO, OTH
St. Stephen-in-the-Fields Anglican Church		1865	Henry Langley		103 Bellevue Avenue	Kensington Market	Old Toronto	OTH, THR
Weston Presbyterian Church		1865			11 Cross Street	Weston	York	ACO, WHCD
William Jamieson House		1865			185 Carleton Street	Cabbagetown	Old Toronto	ACO
502–504 Yonge Street		1865			502–504 Yonge Street	Discovery District	Old Toronto	ACO, THR
506–508 Yonge Street		1865			506–508 Yonge Street	Discovery District	Old Toronto	ACO, THR
526–528 Yonge Street		1865			526–528 Yonge Street	Discovery District	Old Toronto	ACO, THR
634–644 Yonge Street		1865			634–644 Yonge Street	Discovery District	Old Toronto	ACO, THR
8–12 Gloucester Street		1866			8–12 Gloucester Street	Church and Wellesley	Old Toronto	ACO
Glen Hurst		1866			2 Elm Avenue	Rosedale	Old Toronto	ACO
St. Peter's Anglican Church		1866	Grundy and Henry Langley		188 Carlton Street	Cabbagetown	Old Toronto	THR
Spadina House		1866	James Austin		285 Spadina Road	Casa Loma	Old Toronto	ACO
The Witch's House		1866			384 Sumach Street	Cabbagetown	Old Toronto	ACO, CNHCD, THR
358–362 Dundas Street East		1867			358–362 Dundas Street East	Cabbagetown	Old Toronto	THR
Daniel Lamb House		1867			156 Winchester Street	Cabbagetown	Old Toronto	ACO, CNHCD, THR
Jeremiah Annis House		1867			3750 Kingston Road	Cedarbrae	Scarborough	THR
John and Louise Harrison's House		1867			11 Yorkleigh Avenue	Humber Heights – Westmount	Etobicoke	EYCPP
John Daniels House		1867			77 Yorkville Avenue	Yorkville	Old Toronto	THR
J. P. Wheeler House		1867			328 Bellamy Road North	Bendale	Scarborough	THR
Jubilee Terrace		1867			328–332 Sackville Street	Cabbagetown	Old Toronto	ACO
W. Davies and Company Pork Packing (later J. & J. Taylor Safeworks)		1867			145 Front Street East	St. Lawrence	Old Toronto	SLHCD
Farley Houses		1868	James Farley		37-43 Elm Street	Downtown Yonge	Old Toronto	THR
Barberian's Steak House and Tavern		1868			7 Elm Street	Downtown Yonge	Old Toronto	ACO
61 Hayden Street		1868		Georgian Revival	61 Hayden Street	Church and Wellesley	Old Toronto	ACO
John William Drummond Stores		1868			253 Yonge Street	Downtown Yonge	Old Toronto	ACO
Euclid Hall (now Keg Mansion)		1868	Arthur McMaster	Gothic	515 Jarvis Street	Church and Wellesley	Old Toronto	c, THR
76 Church Street		1869		Commercial warehouse	76 Church Street	St. Lawrence	Old Toronto	SLHCD
263 Dundas St East		1869			263 Dundas St East	Garden District	Old Toronto	GDHCD, THR
65 Front Street East		1869		Commercial warehouse	65 Front Street East	St. Lawrence	Old Toronto	SLHCD
249-253 Gerrard St East		1869			249-253 Gerrard St East	Cabbagetown	Old Toronto	ACO
242 King Street East		1869			242 King Street East	Old Town	Old Toronto	SLHCD
913-919 Queen Street West Block		1869			913-919 Queen Street West	Trinity-Bellwoods	Old Toronto	THR
921-927 Queen Street West Block		1869			921-927 Queen Street West	Trinity-Bellwoods	Old Toronto	THR
231 Seaton Street		1869	William Dudley		231 Seaton Street	Cabbagetown	Old Toronto	ACO, THR
685-695 Yonge St Block		1869			685-695 Yonge St	Downtown Yonge	Old Toronto	THR
James Grand House		1869			37 Gloucester Street [Church and Wellesley	Old Toronto	ACO, THR	
James Mulvey House / Factory Theatre		1869			125 Bathurst Street	Fashion District	Old Toronto	ACO, THR
James Pearse Barn		1869			1755 Meadowvale Road	Rouge	Scarborough	THR
Richard West Houses		1869	Richard West	Gothic Revival	104–106 John Street	Entertainment District	Old Toronto	ACO, THR
Rouge Valley Conservation Centre		1869	James Pearse Jr.		1749 Meadowvale Road	Rouge	Scarborough	ACO, THR
Zion Schoolhouse		1869			1091 Finch Avenue East	Don Valley Village	North York	THR

== Reference keys ==
ACO: Architectural Conservancy of Ontario (Toronto) - TOBuilt
B: Benn1993
C: Cruickshank2008
CE: Canadian Encyclopedia
CNHCD: Cabbagetown North Heritage Conservation District
CoT: City of Toronto - Heritage bylaw citations
CRHP: Canadian Register of Historic Places
CSHCD: Cabbagetown South Heritage Conservation District
EHS: Etobicoke Historical Society
EYCPP: Etobicoke York Community Preservation Panel - Etobicoke York Pre-Confederation Architectural Treasures
GDHCD: Garden District Heritage Conservation District
GO: Government of Ontario
M: McHughBozikovic2017
OHT: Ontario Heritage Trust
PC: Parks Canada - National Historic Sites
SLHCD: St Lawrence Heritage Conservation District
SRHCD: South Rosedale Heritage Conservation District
THR: City of Toronto Heritage Register
TPL: Toronto Public Library - Digital Archive
WHCD: Weston Heritage Conservation District
OTH: Other - see citation

== See also ==
- List of historic places in Toronto
- List of lost buildings and structures in Toronto
- List of oldest buildings in Canada
- List of Village at Black Creek buildings
- Toronto landmarks
