= List of buildings and structures at Black Creek Pioneer Village =

There are over forty 19th-century buildings at The Village at Black Creek in Toronto, Canada, all of which are decorated and furnished according to the styles of the 1860s, some with the building's original furnishings.

== Listing ==
Several of the buildings were originally constructed at their current location. The others were relocated from other communities in Ontario.

Building	Photo	Const.	Original location	Architectural style	Relocated	Opened	Notes	Ref.
Apple storage cellar		1850 (c.)	Edgeley	Field stone and brick	1976	1976	The building was dismantled at its original site and reconstructed at Black Creek Pioneer Village.	BCPV
Bolton Shop		1865	Bolton		1968	1973	Originally used by a merchant tailor. Houses a 19th-century photography studio.	BCPV
Broom Maker's Shop		1840 (c.)	Sherwood	Square log	1963	1973	May have been first school in Maple.	BCPV, MMT
Burwick House		1844	Woodbridge	Rural Georgian	13 August 1958		Front portion moved to site intact; back portion required reconstruction. Furnishings are original with imported Regency style dining room, Chippendale and Sheraton parlour pieces, and locally crafted bedroom and kitchen furniture.	MMT, BCPV, BCPV
Burwick Stable		1860	Woodbridge					THR
Cemetery		1845	Current site	N/A	N/A	N/A	Last interment was in 1927.	BCPV, THR
Charles Irvine's Weaver's Shop; Printing Office		1850	Kettleby	Timber frame	1968	1971	Constructed as a temperance hall by the Sons of Temperance. Moved intact in 1968. Contains a functional Washington flat bed press, a Gordon press, and a flying shuttle loom.	BCPV
Chicken House		1860 (c.)	Kettleby	Round log	1972	1973		BCPV
Church Drive Shed		1860	Vaughan		1982		Used to provide covered parking for parishioner horses and buggies. Dismantled in the 1970s by the Credit Valley Conservation Authority.	BCPV
Dickson Hill School		1861	Dickson Hill		1960		Typical of the area's one-room schoolhouses of the period. The building was dismantled, moved to its current site, and rebuilt.	BCPV
Doctor's House		1830 (c.)	Chinguacousy	Timber frame with wood sheathing, stucco finish	1973	1978	Building had two separate quarters with dedicated entrances, one side used by the family, the other side for the medical practice. This is a re-creation of a doctor's residence.	CC, BCPV, Taylor 1994
Dominion Carriage Works and Cabinet Shop		1860	Sebringville		1973	1976	Includes original tools and patterns.	BCPV
Edgeley Mennonite Meeting House		1824	Edgeley	Log building	15 October 1976		Contains original furnishings.	BCPV
Edgeley Mennonite Meeting House Drive Shed		1860	Edgeley					THR
Edgeley Slaughter House		1860 (c.)	Edgeley	Timber frame	1970	1971	Used by local farmers to butcher animals.	THR
Fisherville Church		1856	Fisherville	Greek Revival	1960	1962		BCPV
Daniel Flynn House		1858	Newtonbrook	Ontario classic style	1959	1960		BCPV
Daniel Flynn Boot and Shoe Shop		1858	Newtonbrook			1963		BCPV
Half Way House Inn		1849	Scarborough	Georgian	1966		Typical of tavern structures common in southern Ontario before Canadian Confederation. The building required extensive restoration, performed based on historical documents and the building's structure. Named because it was located halfway between Dunbarton and the St. Lawrence Market.	MMT, BCPV, OTH
Harness Shop and Saddlery		1855	North York					BCPV
Laskay Emporium		1845	Laskay	Frame with false front	19 February 1960		Reconstructed based on historical documents and photographs from 1911.	BCPV
Limehouse Outhouse		1840 (c.)	Limehouse	Neoclassical/Georgian	1971	1972		BCPV
Mackenzie Barn		1850 (c.)	Woodbridge	Timber frame on stone foundation				BCPV
Mackenzie House		1830 (c.)	Woodbridge	House / Log cabin	1973		William Mackenzie's house, formerly at Highway 7 & Islington. Parts of John Brown's original log cabin incorporated into it.	BCPV, Taylor 1994
The Manse		1835	Richmond Hill	Neoclassical	7 October 1978		Used as manse by reverend of the Richmond Hill Presbyterian Church. Moved to Black Creek Pioneer Village in two pieces.	BCPV
Roblin's Mill		1842	Ameliasburg		1964		Consists of original timbers, flooring, and machinery, except for the 1848 wheel, which was replaced with a smaller version. The building was scheduled for demolition before its acquisition.	BCPV
Rose Blacksmith Shop		1855 (c.)	Nobleton	Timber frame, board and batten	1958	1960		BCPV
Snider Backhouse		1820	Concord	Round-log backhouse		1967	Originally a second house for the Snider family, later used as a farm workshop. Moved to Black Creek Pioneer Village as a Canadian Centennial project by the Snider family.	BCPV
Henry Snider's Cider Mill		1840 (c.)	Elia		1959	1961	The mill was used to produce cider for family and friends; it was not used commercially, though it had a screw press with a capacity to make 500 imperial gallons (2,300 L) of cider daily.	MMT, BCPV
Daniel Stong’s First House		1816	Current site	Squared log	N/A	1958	Was used as Stong residence until 1832, then repurposed as an outbuilding.	MMT, BCPV, THR
Daniel Stong's Second House		1832 (c.)	Current site	Squared log on fieldstone foundation	N/A	1960		BCPV, CoT, ACO
Daniel Stong Smoke House and Butchery		1820 (c.)	Current site	Squared log	N/A	1960	Rebuilt in 1965 because of fire.	BCPV, MMT
Daniel Stong Grain Barn		1825	Current site		N/A	1960	One of the buildings original to the site.	BCPV, THR
Daniel Stong's Piggery		1858						CoT
Samuel Stong House		1855 (c.)	Vaughan	Log house				BCPV
Taylor Cooperage		1850 (c.)	Paris	Timber frame with board and batten	1976	1988		BCPV
Tinsmith Shop and Masonic Lodge		1850 (c.)	Woodbridge		1983	1984	Ground floor was a tinsmith shop, upper floor a Masonic lodge. Donated by the Masons of Ontario. Dismantled, moved, and reconstructed at the current site.	MMT, BCPV
Wilmot Township Hall		1858	Baden	Timber frame with clapboard siding	1967		Housed the Fifth Division Court of the County of Waterloo.	BCPV, T

== Reference keys ==
ACO: Architectural Conservancy of Ontario, Toronto, Chapter - TOBuilt database listing for Murray Ross Parkway
BCPV: Black Creek Pioneer Village - Black Creek Pioneer Village Historic Building List
CoT: City of Toronto - Heritage bylaw citations
MMT: Mika Mika Thompson
THR: City of Toronto Heritage Register - "City of Toronto's Heritage Property Detail: 1000 MURRAY ROSS PKWY". secure.toronto.ca. City of Toronto.
OTH: Other - see citation

== See also ==
- List of oldest buildings and structures in Toronto
- List of oldest buildings in Canada
