= John Daniels House =

19th-century house in Toronto

Coordinates: 43°40′15.6″N 79°23′28.7″W

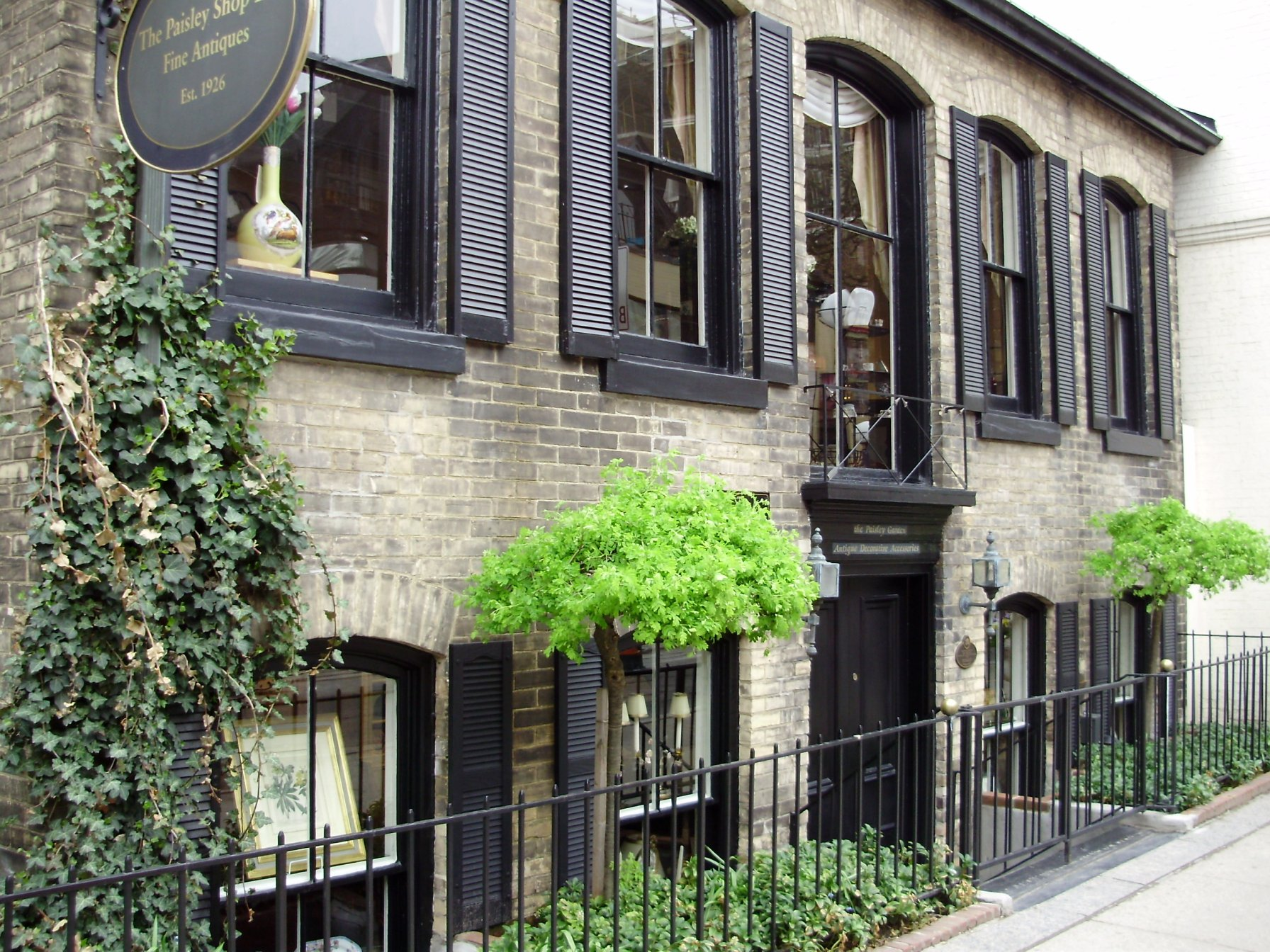
The John Daniels House in 2008.

The John Daniels House is a historic building located at 77 Yorkville Avenue in the Yorkville neighbourhood in Toronto, Ontario, Canada.

John Daniels, a constable for the village of Yorkville in the mid-19th century, built the structure as his home in 1867. It is designed in a Georgian style.

It is one of the last surviving historic buildings in the area, and was designated under the Ontario Heritage Act in 1985. Presently, it houses a small antique shop.

== See also ==
- List of oldest buildings and structures in Toronto
