= Armour Heights =

Coordinates: 43.743°N 79.429°W

- Neighbourhood
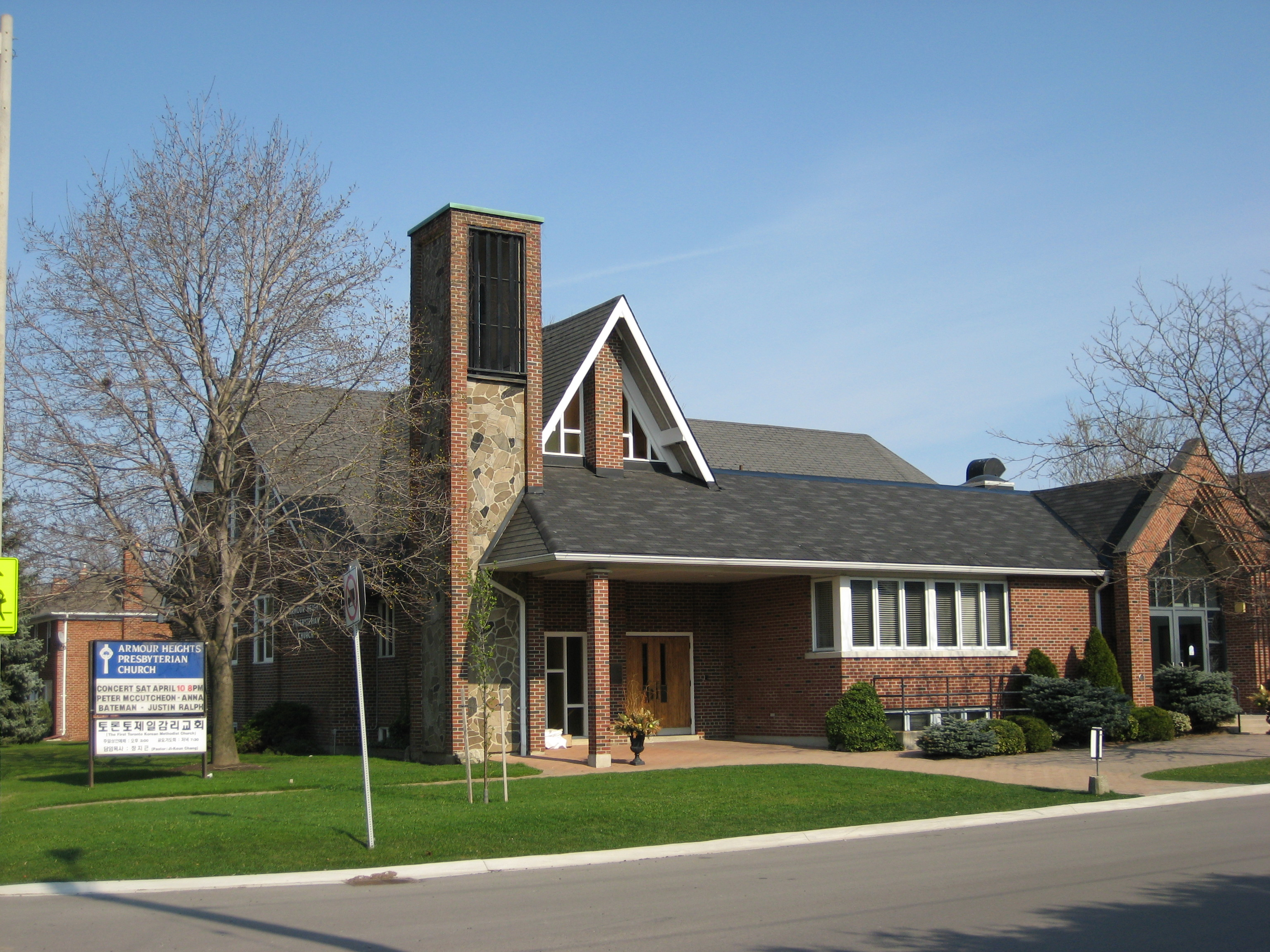
- Armour Heights Presbyterian Church

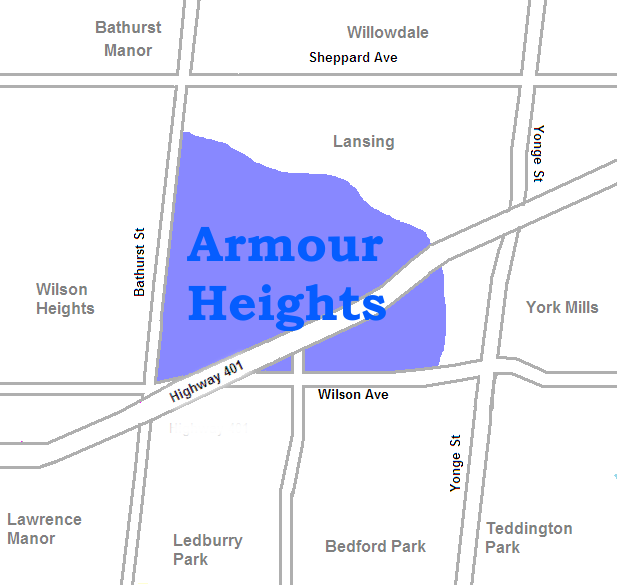
- Country: Canada
- Province: Ontario
- City: Toronto

Armour Heights is a neighbourhood in Toronto, Ontario, Canada, in the district of North York. It is bounded by Wilson Avenue to the south, Bathurst Street to the west, and the west branch of the Don River to the north and east. Highway 401 cuts through the centre of the neighbourhood.

Armour Heights is not considered a neighbourhood by the City of Toronto. Instead, it and nearby Lansing are grouped into one neighbourhood called Lansing-Westgate. However, the areas are colloquially referred to as Lansing and Armour Heights.

== History ==
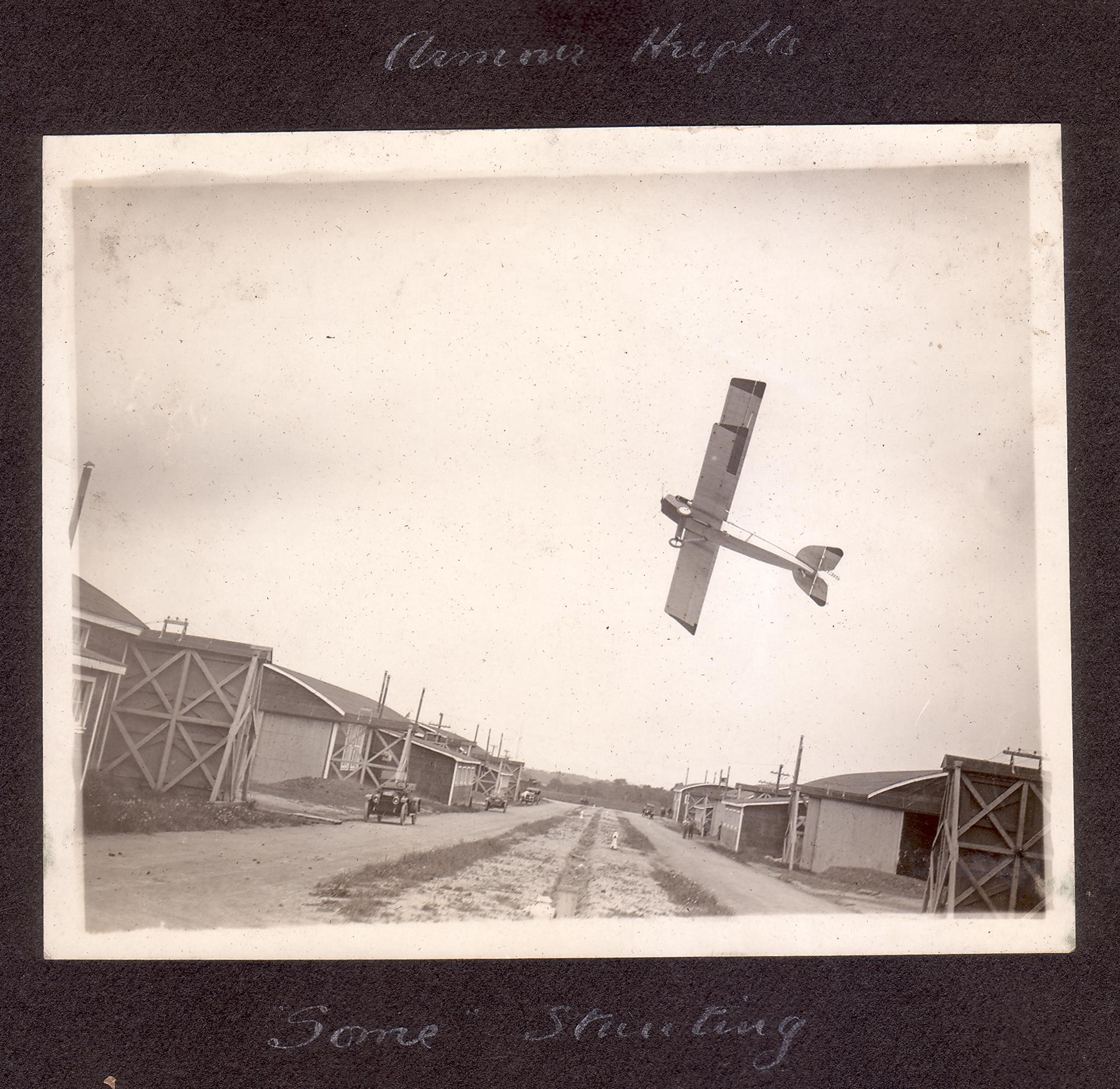
A plane flying above the hangars in Armour Heights, January 1918. During World War I, the area was home to an airfield that trained pilots.

The area is named after John Armour, a farmer who bought land on the west side of Yonge from James Hogg in 1838. In 1910 the land was purchased by developer and speculator Colonel Frederick Burton Robins, who built a large estate for himself named Strathrobyn (completed in 1914). His development plans were put on hold by the war. He decided to loan out the lands to the military, and an air training facility was established in 1917. It mostly trained American pilots and among other figures saw Amelia Earhart work there.

After the war, the airfield became the base for Bishop-Barker Aeroplanes Limited, operated by war heroes Billy Bishop and William George Barker. It was at this site that Bishop had one of the most dangerous crashes of his career. The company folded in 1921 and the airfield was abandoned. Some development occurred during the 1920s, but the area was still too far from the centre of the city to attract many buyers.

The air force returned to the area in 1943, when it leased Strathrobyn as an officer's mess and training school. It remains in service today as the Canadian Forces College, one of the main officer training facilities of the Canadian Forces.

In the 1950s, some of the neighbourhood's streets were destroyed due to the construction of Highway 401. One of the major streets in Toronto, Avenue Road, terminates at the Armour Heights neighbourhood at Bombay Avenue. There is an Avenue Road/401 Parclo A4 interchange just south of Bombay Avenue.

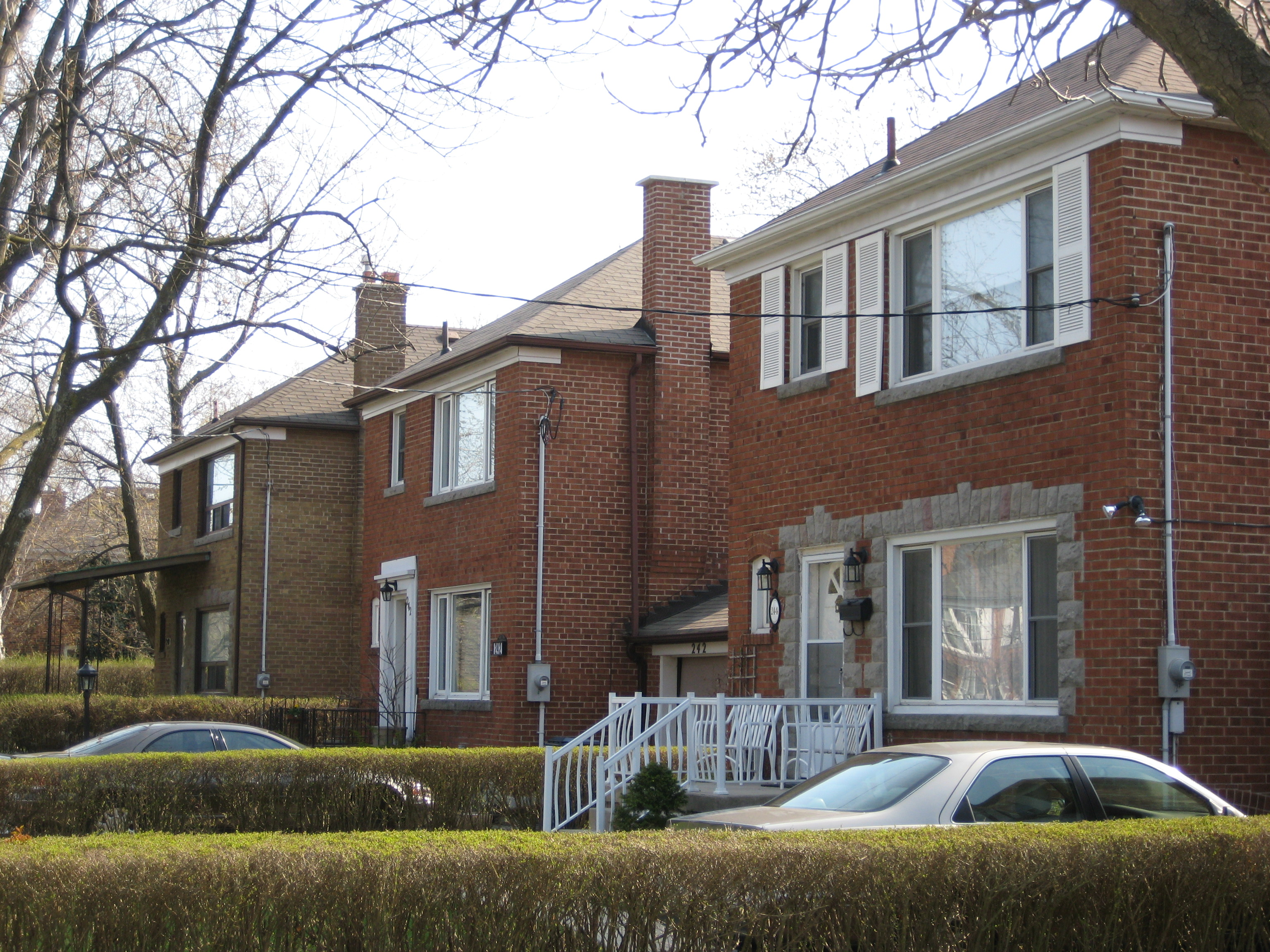
Construction for suburban housing in Armour Heights began in the 1940s.

The post-war years saw the steady development of the neighbourhood, and all the farmland was transformed into middle-class suburban housing by the beginning of the 1970s. It has become an important Jewish area of Toronto. It is just to the east of Bathurst Manor, the most Jewish neighbourhood in Toronto. Bathurst Street is lined with a number of Jewish stores and restaurants, and synagogues such as Adath Israel. According to the 2001 census, 12% of the population is Jewish. An important landmark is Toronto's Holocaust Memorial, which is located just north of the community in Earl Bales Park.

== Education ==
One public school board operates schools in Armour Heights, the secular English first language Toronto District School Board (TDSB). TDSB operates two elementary schools in the neighbourhood, Armour Heights Public School, and Summit Heights Public School. TDSB does not operate a secondary school in the neighbourhood, with TDSB secondary school students residing in Armour Heights attending institutions in adjacent neighbourhoods.

In addition to TDSB, three other public school boards also offer schooling to residents of the neighbourhood, although they do not operate schools in Armour Heights. The Toronto Catholic District School Board (TCDSB) is an English first language separate school board, whereas Conseil scolaire catholique MonAvenir (CSCM), the Conseil scolaire Viamonde (CSV) are French first language school boards, the former being separate, the latter being secular. CSCM, CSV, and TCDSB students attend schools situated in other neighbourhoods in Toronto.

== Recreation ==
Several municipal parks are situated in Armour Heights, managed by the Toronto Parks, Forestry and Recreation Division. Armour Heights Community Centre, a local community centre managed by the division, is situated along the southeast boundary of the neighbourhood. Green spaces in the area form a part of valley that surrounds the Don River. The valleys are a part of the Toronto ravine system.

== Transportation ==
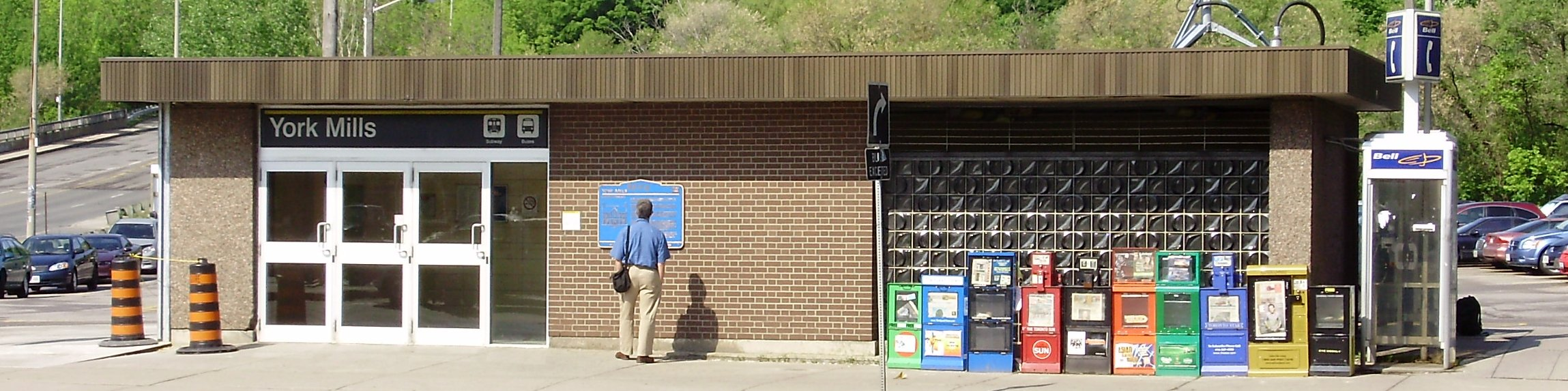
York Mills station for the Toronto subway is located southeast of the neighbourhood.

Several major roadways pass through Armour Heights, including Highway 401, a controlled access highway. The highway runs east-west, connecting the neighbourhood with the rest of Greater Toronto, and southern Ontario. Bathurst Street is a major thoroughfare, that also serves as the neighbourhood's western boundary. Another major thoroughfare, Avenue Road, also ends within the neighbourhood. The city's main thoroughfare, Yonge Street, is located east of the neighbourhood.

Public transportation in Armour Heights is served by the Toronto Transit Commission (TTC) bus system. In addition to buses, the Toronto subway may be accessed from York Mills station, a subway station on Yonge Street. GO Transit's regional commuter bus routes may also be accessed from York Mills Bus Terminal, which is situated in the adjacent neighbourhood, east of Yonge Street.
