= Rouge, Toronto =

Rouge
- Neighbourhood
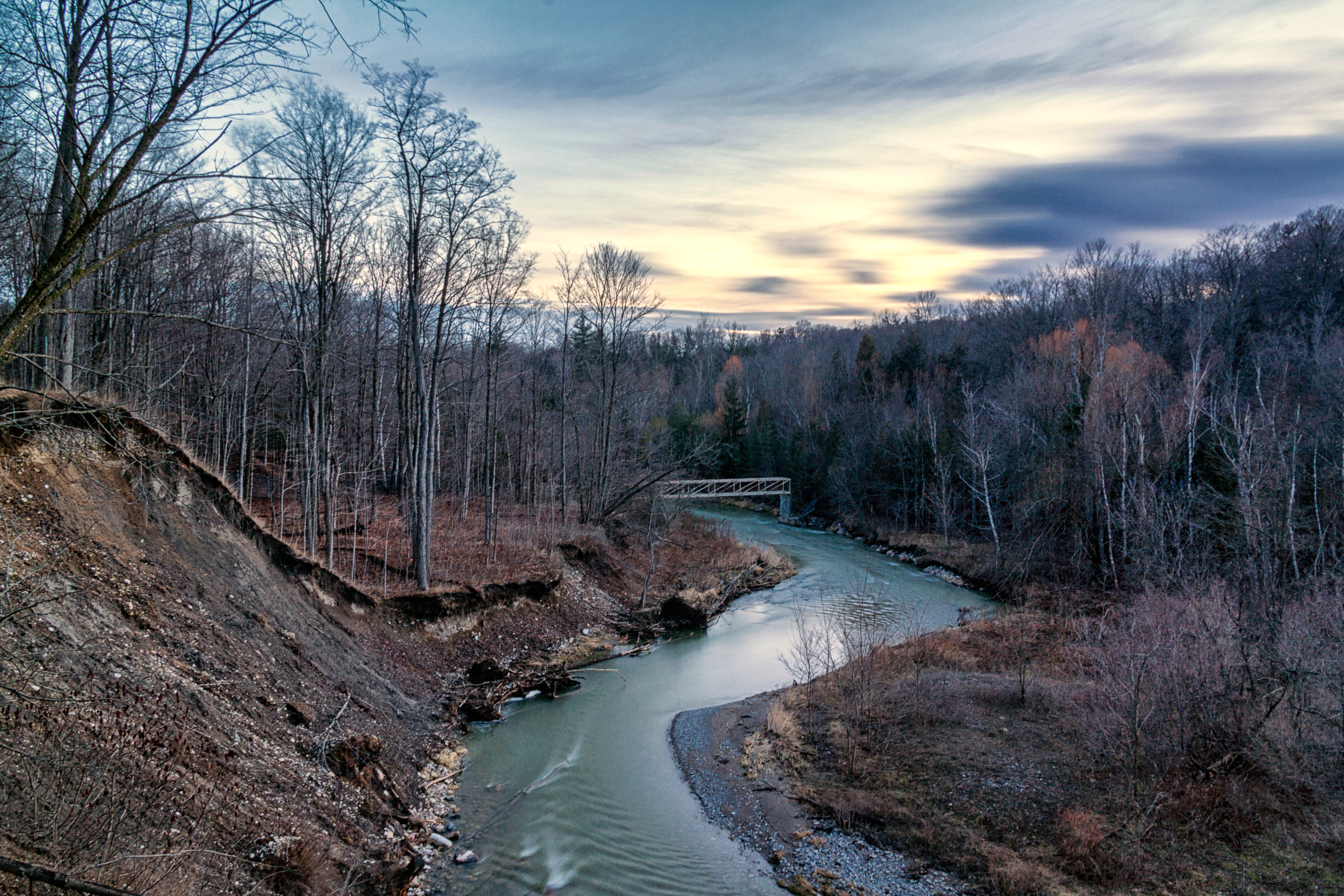
- View of the Rouge River from Finch Meandor, within Rouge National Urban Park

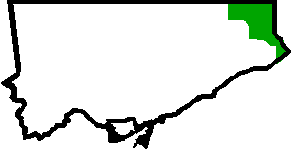
- Location of Rouge within Toronto
- Coordinates: 43°49′15″N 79°12′22″W
- Country: Canada
- Province: Ontario
- City: Toronto
- Established: 1850 Scarborough Township
- Changed municipality: 1998 Toronto from City of Scarborough

Government
  - MP: Gary Anandasangaree (L)
  - MPP: Raymond Cho (C); Tracey MacCharles (L)
  - Councillor: Neethan Shan

Population
  - Total: 102,275

Rouge is a neighbourhood in the northeastern area of Toronto, Ontario, within the former city of Scarborough. It is Toronto's largest neighbourhood by surface area; however, unlike other neighbourhoods, most of its area remains undeveloped, as the neighbourhood is adjacent to Rouge National Urban Park.

== Location ==
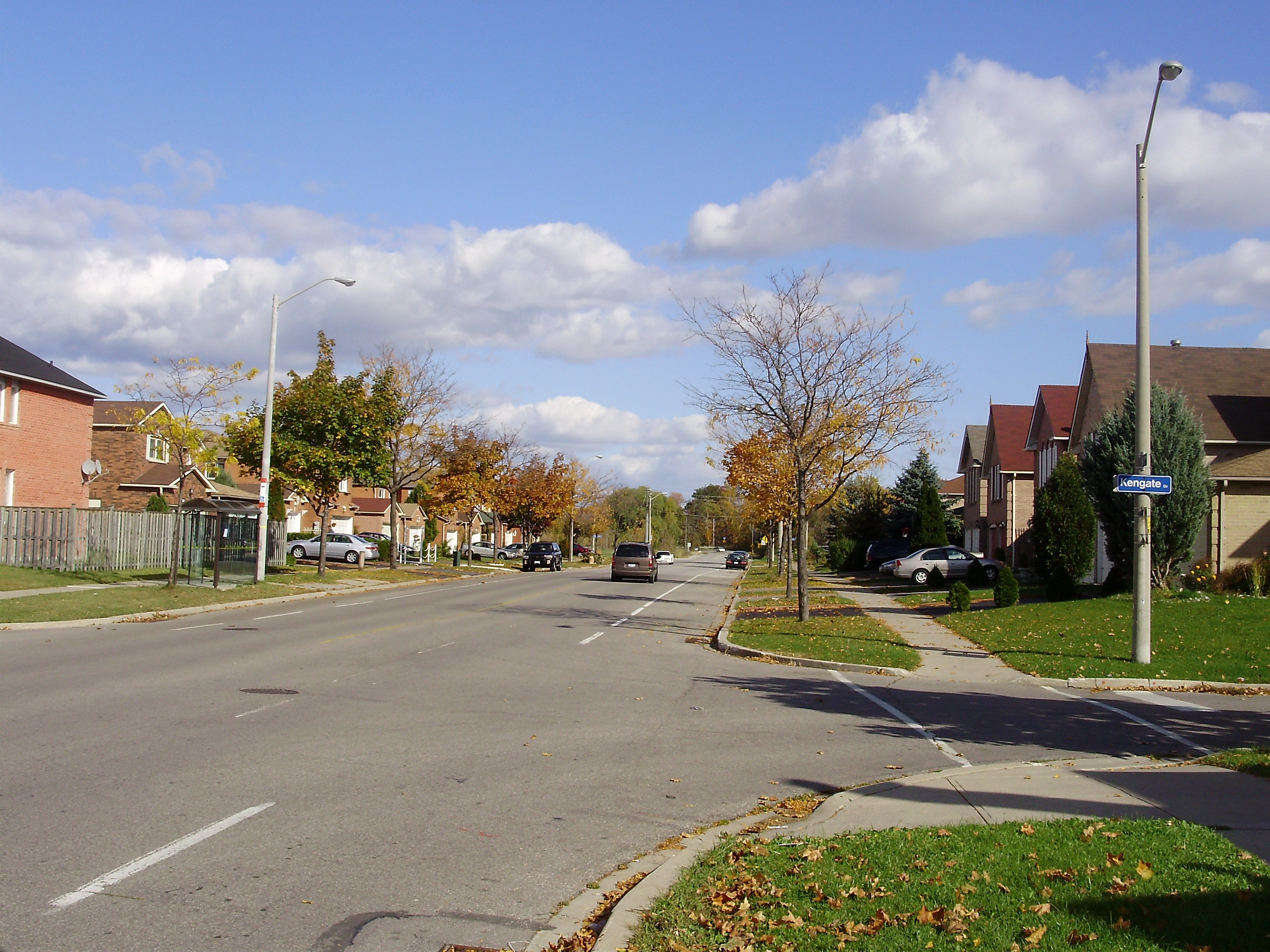
A residential area of Rouge. Developed areas of Rouge are largely suburban.

It is bounded on the north by Steeles Avenue East, on the east by the Pickering Town Line and the Rouge River, on the south by Lake Ontario, and on the west by Port Union Road, Kingston Road, Highway 401, Morningside Avenue, Finch Avenue East, and Markham Road.

It is one of the largest neighbourhoods officially recognized by the City of Toronto, and is dominated by the Rouge River, its tributaries, and associated wilderness areas. North of Sheppard Avenue the neighbourhood has a strong suburban quality, with seventy-four percent of households single-family residences.

Beyond its official categorization, Rouge can be subdivided into smaller neighbourhoods more commonly known as Dean Park, Rouge Hill, Hillside, and West Rouge, among others.

== History ==
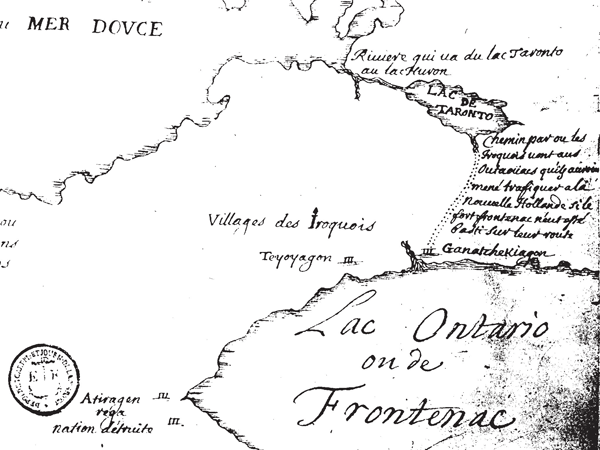
A map depicting Ganatsekwyagon and the Rouge Trail, c. 1673.

The area situated along the Rouge River was considered a part of the Toronto Carrying-Place Trail, a portaging route to the Holland River, linking Lake Ontario to Lake Simcoe. This route was used by the indigenous peoples, and later by European traders, explorers and settlers.

The Seneca people established the village of Ganatsekwyagon in the area that presently makes up the neighbourhood. However, the settlement was abandoned by the end of the 17th century, as a result of the Beaver Wars. Presently referred to as Bead Hill, the area is an archaeological site comprising the only known remaining and intact 17th-century Seneca site in Canada. It was designated a National Historic Site of Canada in 1991.

== Education ==
Two public school boards operate elementary schools in Morningside, the separate Toronto Catholic District School Board (TCDSB), and the secular Toronto District School Board (TDSB).

TCDSB operates two public elementary schools, St. Dominic Savio Catholic School, and St. Jean De Brebeuf Catholic School. TDSB operates four public elementary schools in Rouge, Alvin Curling Public School, Chief Dan George Public School, John G. Diefenbaker Public School, and Rouge Valley Public School

Neither school board operates a secondary school in the neighbourhood, with TCDSB/TDSB secondary school students residing in Rouge attending institutions in adjacent neighbourhoods. The French-based public secular school board, Conseil scolaire Viamonde, and it separate counterpart, Conseil scolaire catholique MonAvenir also offer schooling to applicable residents of Morningside, although they do not operate a school in the neighbourhood, with CSCM/CSV students attending schools situated in other neighbourhoods in Toronto.

== Recreation ==
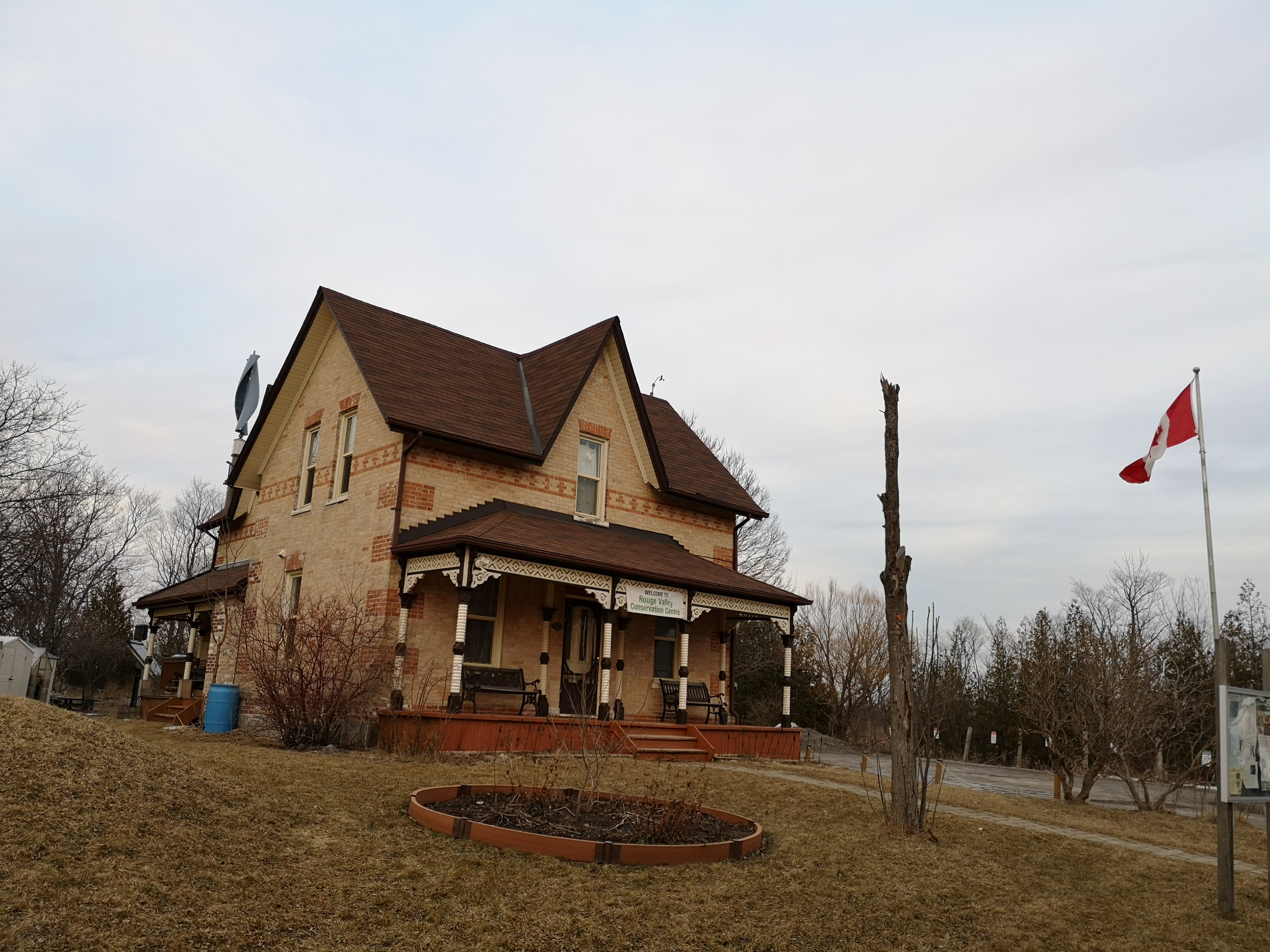
The Rouge Valley Conservation Centre in Rouge National Urban Park, a national park that extends into the Rouge neighbourhood.

The neighbourhood is home to several municipal parks near the Rouge River ravine system, including Bob Hunter Park, Adams Park and Dean Park. Municipal parks in Rouge are managed by the Toronto Parks, Forestry and Recreation Division. In addition to municipal parks, the City of Toronto also manages the Toronto Zoo, a zoo located within the neighbourhood.

Rouge National Urban Park, a national urban park of Canada, is also situated in the neighbourhood. Situated along the Rouge River, the national park takes up the eastern portion of the neighbourhood, as well as other municipalities within Greater Toronto. The park is managed by Parks Canada.

== See also ==
- List of neighbourhoods in Toronto
