= Downtown Yonge =

District in Toronto, Ontario, Canada

- Neighbourhood
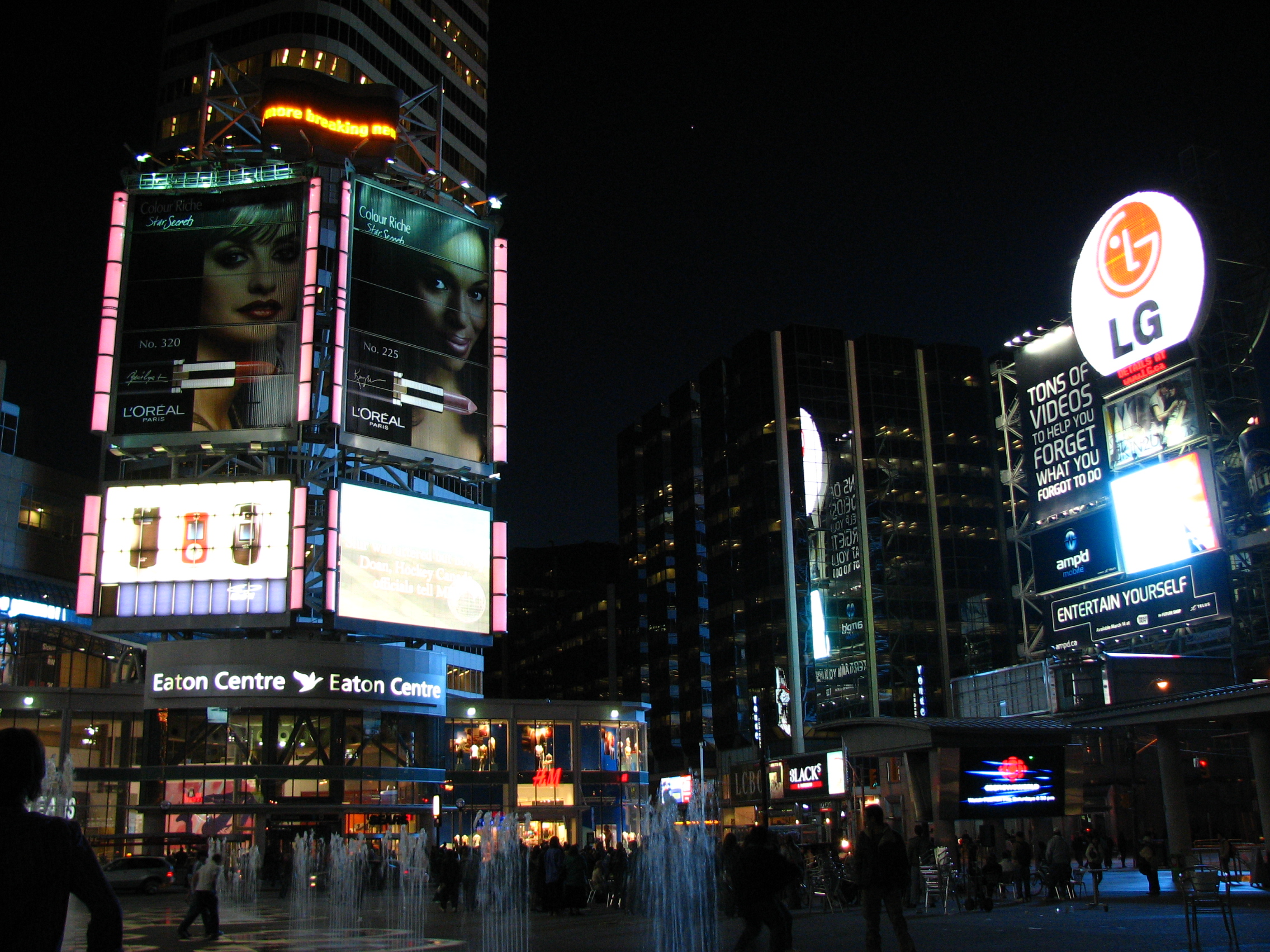
- Sankofa Square at night looking west towards the Toronto Eaton Centre

- Location within Toronto
- Coordinates: 43°39′20.5″N 79°22′50.3″W
- Country: Canada
- Province: Ontario
- City: Toronto

Downtown Yonge is a retail and entertainment district centred on Yonge Street in Downtown Toronto, Ontario, Canada. The Downtown Yonge district is bounded by Richmond Street to the south; Grosvenor and Alexander Streets to the north; Bay Street to the west; and portions of Church Street, Victoria Street, and Bond Street to the east. All property owners and commercial tenants within these boundaries are members of the Downtown Yonge Business Improvement Area association, founded in 2001.

== History ==
The district has been a busy shopping district for over 100 years. While the original shopping street of Toronto was King Street east of Yonge, the noteworthy development of the area into a shopping district was the opening and expansion of the T. Eaton store at Yonge and Queen Street.

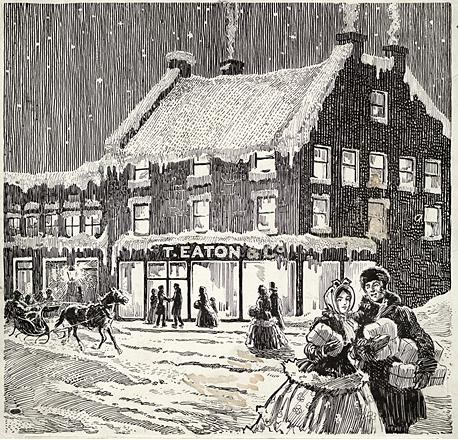
The shopping district began to develop in 1869, with the opening of the first Eaton's store on Yonge Street.

The store eventually grew to encompass over three city blocks on the west side of Yonge, used for ancillary stores and factories of the Eaton company. Across Queen Street from the Eaton store, the Robert Simpson department store grew to encompass the entire south-east corner block of Yonge and Queen. The Simpson store exists today as the Hudson's Bay Company store. North of Dundas Street, a landmark store was opened by Sam Sniderman called Sam the Record Man, which offered three floors of records.

As the retail usage developed, so did entertainment uses. Massey Hall was built just to the east of Yonge Street on Shuter, along with the Pantages and Wintergarden theatres on Yonge between Dundas and Queen Street. Massey Hall remains mostly in the state that it was when it opened, while the two theatres were both converted into movie houses, then reconverted back into live theatre venues.

Starting in the 1960s, the T. Eaton Company made plans to redevelop its lands on the west side of Yonge Street. This eventually became the genesis of today's Toronto Eaton Centre. The Eaton store was moved to Yonge and Dundas, and is today the Sears store. All of the west side of Yonge Street from Queen to Dundas was demolished and the mall built. Only the Holy Trinity Church and the Old City Hall remain of the pre-Eaton Centre buildings from Dundas to Queen, from Yonge to Bay remain.

== Attractions ==
The Downtown Yonge area is best known as the home of the Toronto Eaton Centre indoor mall, Toronto’s largest and most visited tourist attraction. Adjacent to the mall, at the corner of Yonge and Dundas Street is Sankofa Square, a large public square. The area is well known for shopping, including music retailers, mid-priced fashion stores, and jewelers.

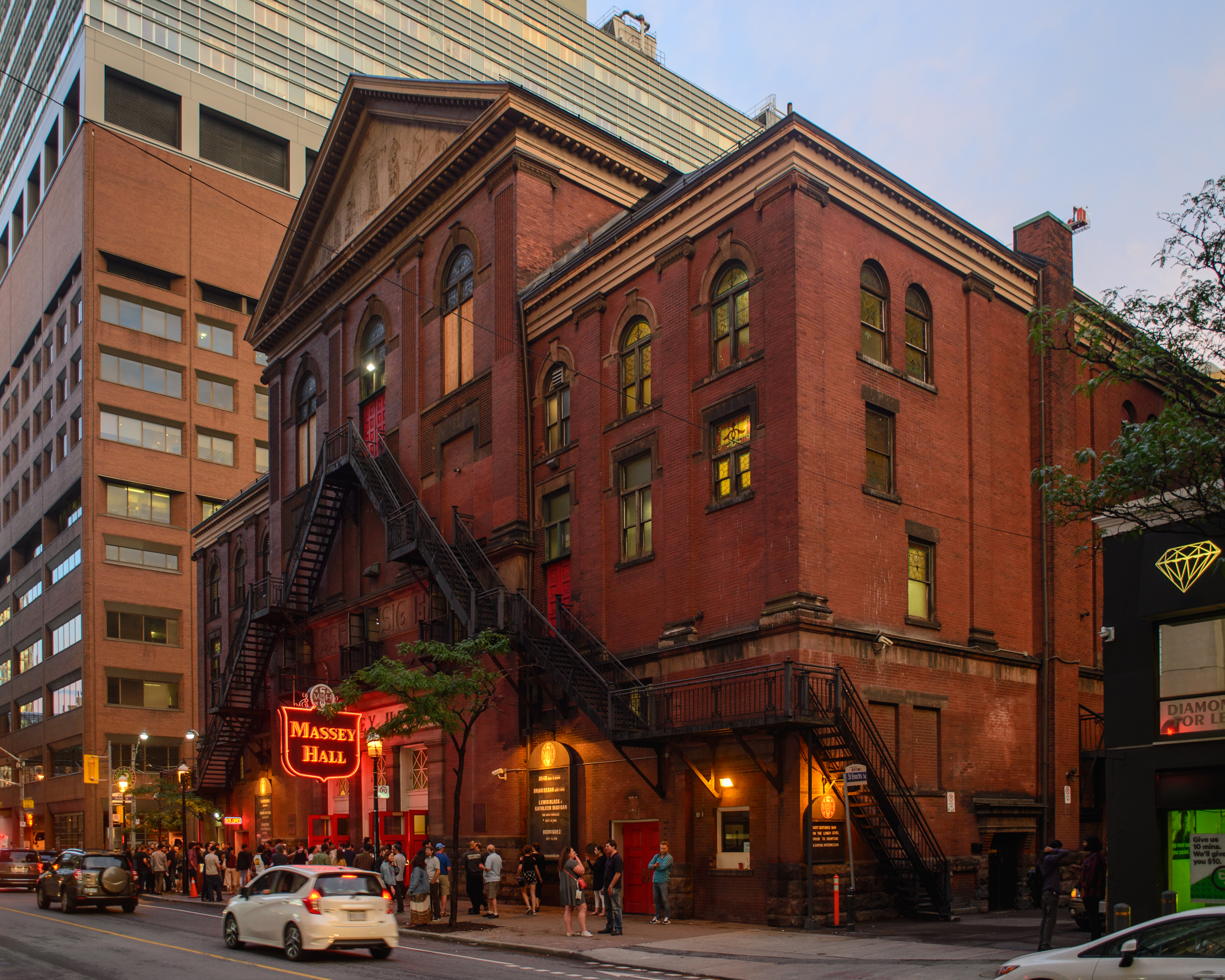
Opened in 1894, Massey Hall is a performing arts theatre and a major attraction in Downtown Yonge.

The district is home to a number of performance venues including the Canon Theatre, the Carlu, the Elgin and Winter Garden Theatres, Massey Hall and the Zanzibar Tavern. The area’s heritage properties include such notable sites as the Arts & Letters Club, Mackenzie House, Maple Leaf Gardens, Old City Hall and the demolished Sam the Record Man store.

== Business Improvement Area ==
The Downtown Yonge district is a registered business improvement area, known as the Downtown Yonge Business Improvement Area. The 2,000 businesses and property owners of the area are members of the Downtown Yonge Business Improvement Area Association (BIA). There is a volunteer Board that sets the strategic direction of the association. The Board has fourteen seats, which includes twelve members of the association and two City of Toronto representatives, specifically the local City Councillor (Kyle Rae). There is a committee structure that reports to the Board and a small number of staff and service providers who implement the association’s initiatives.

The focus of the BIA association is on key areas that include clean streets, safe streets, social improvement, streetscape improvements, and marketing. Some of the most notable initiatives include:

-Clean Streets Team – A full-time street cleaning team, hired by the Downtown Yonge is responsible for graffiti removal, poster removal, litter sweeping, and sidewalk pressure washing. The crew supplements the work of the City and has been operating since January 2002.

-Police Foot Patrols – A dedicated presence of police foot patrol officers add to the safety of Downtown Yonge streets. Improvements have been made in such areas as street crime, drugs, and illegal vending. The Downtown Yonge B.I.A. hires the officers to supplement the existing levels of policing in the area. The program has been operating since April 2002.

-Social Improvement – Businesses, social service agencies, the City of Toronto, and other community interests are working together to expand outreach support to the homeless in the Downtown Yonge area, equip businesses with tools to deal with situations, and advocating for long term solutions.

-Holiday Openings – The Downtown Yonge area is the first district in Toronto to be officially designated a tourist area. This allows retailers the option of legally opening on statutory holidays. The area realized this status in June 2002.

-Streetscape Improvements – The identity and sense of place in Downtown Yonge is being enhanced through traffic poles that are branded with the association’s logo at major Yonge Street intersections. Holiday decorations suspended above Yonge Street add to the festive atmosphere of the district annually in November and December.

-Discovery Team – A mobile ambassador program during the summer months was launched in May 2005. A multi-lingual group of trained visitors services personnel help the public meet their business, shopping, and entertainment needs in the Downtown Yonge area.

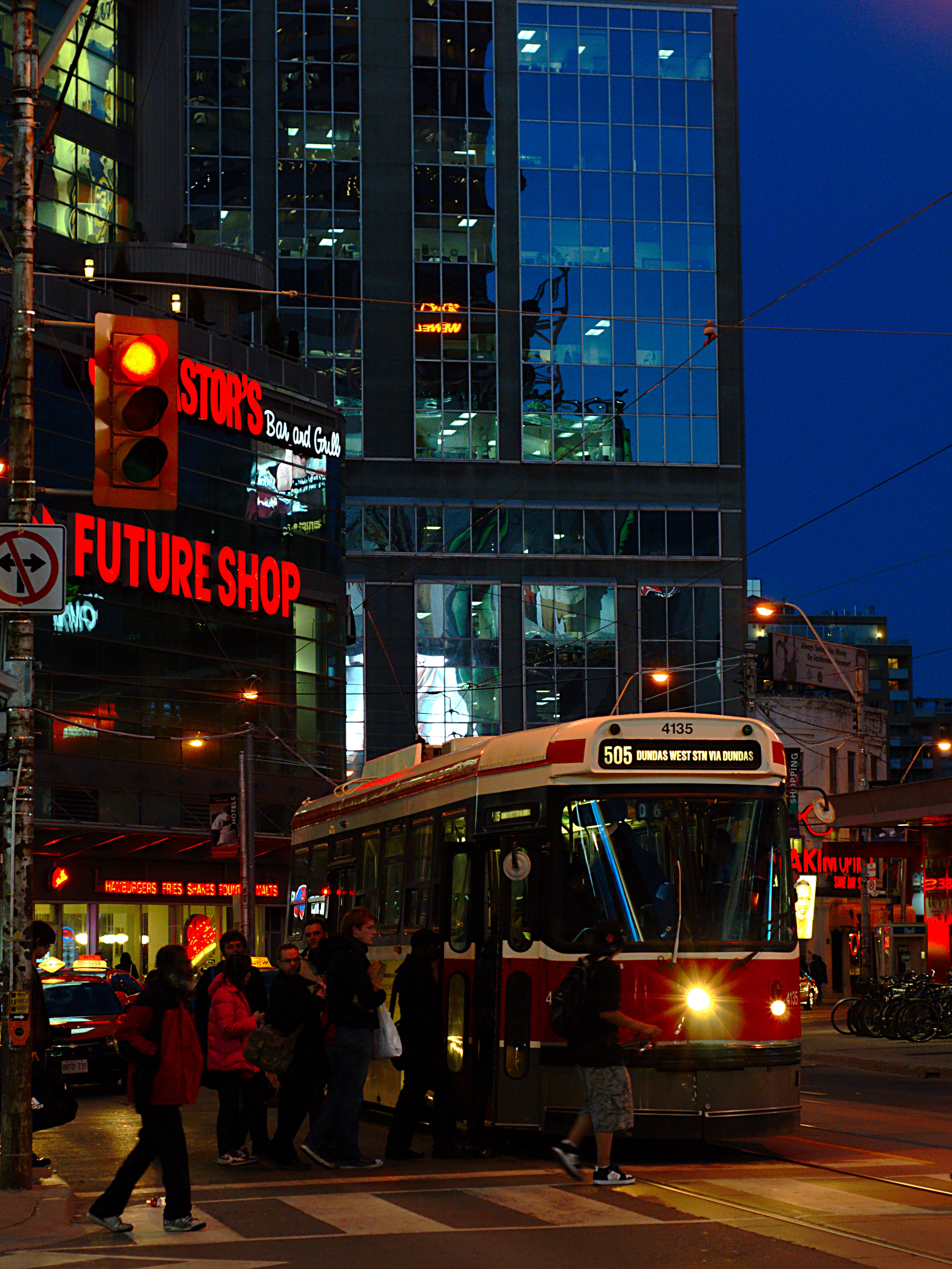
People boarding a streetcar from the 505 Dundas line in Downtown Yonge. The streetcar line is one of three lines that passes through Downtown Yonge.

== Transportation ==
The area is served by the Toronto Transit Commission’s Queen, TMU, and College subway stations, as well as the Yonge bus and 501 Queen, 505 Dundas, and 506 Carlton street car routes.
