= Graydon Hall =

- Neighbourhood
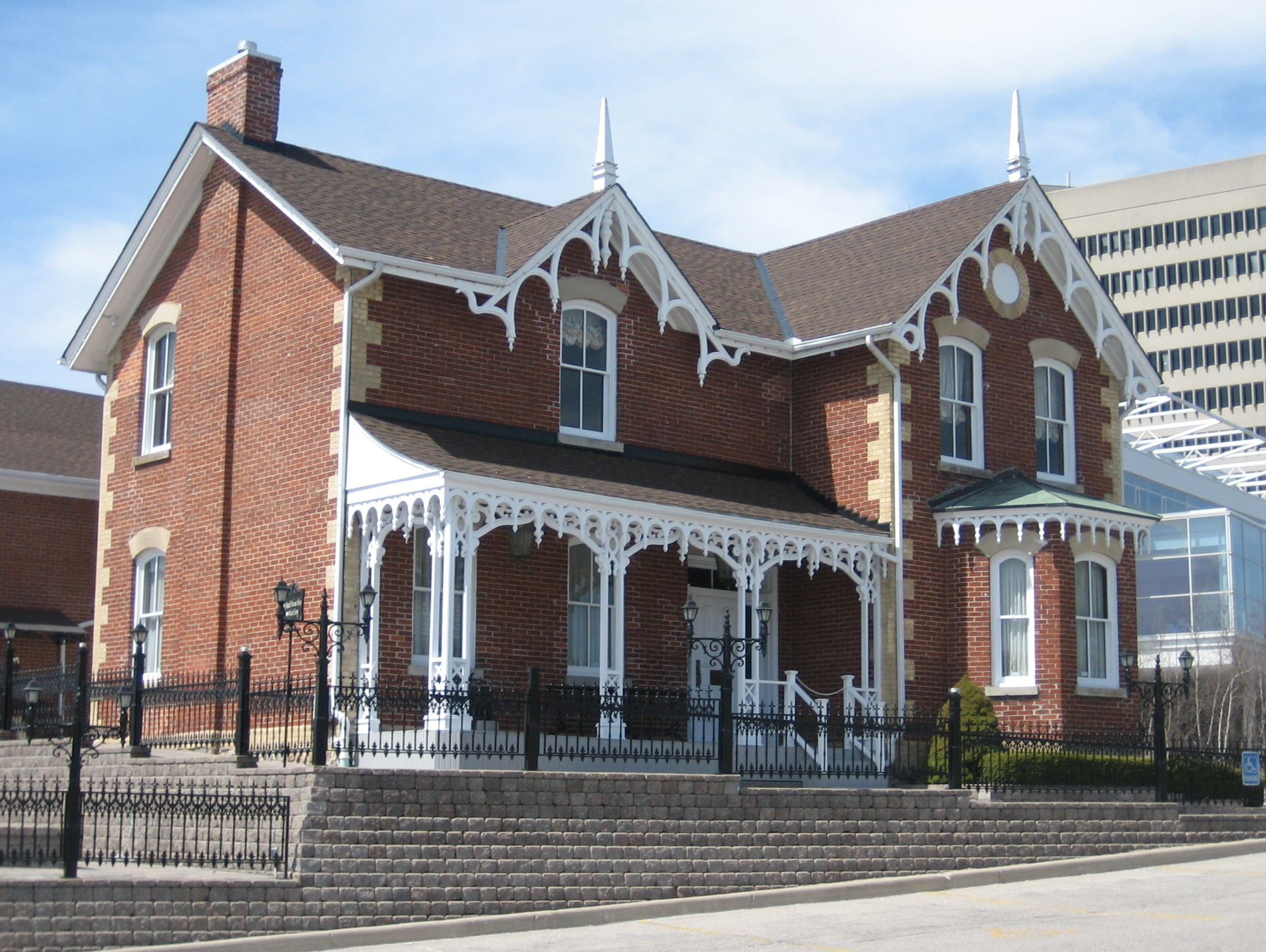
- David Duncan House in Graydon Hall
- Interactive map of Graydon Hall
- Coordinates: 43.763845°N 79.342900°W
- Country: Canada
- Province: Ontario
- City: Toronto
- Municipality established: 1850 York Township
- Changed municipality: 1922 North York from York Township
- Changed municipality: 1998 Toronto from North York

Area
  - Total: 0.981 km^{2} (0.379 sq mi)

Graydon or sometimes referred to as Graydon Hall is a neighbourhood in the city of Toronto, Ontario, Canada. It is located just south of Ontario Highway 401, West of a nearby neighborhood called Parkwoods, North of York Mills Road and west of the Don Valley Parkway.

The neighbourhood is built up on hillside terrains and is home to the Donalda Golf course. In the North East quadrant of the neighbourhood is the area known as Parkwoods.

Graydon Hall is known for its Graydon Hall Manor, a historic boutique conference and reception facility.

== History ==
David Duncan House is named for owner of the lands (Lots 10 and 11 east of Leslie Street) for which much of Graydon Hall now resides. His home was on the farm called Moatfield (built in 1865), which was given to him by his father and Irish-born William Duncan III (who was also settler of Dublin Village along Sheppard Avenue from Dufferin Street to Keele Street on Lots 16 and 17).

Duncan Mills Road and former Canadian Northern Railway Duncan Station (located in Don Mills, later as Oriole and now demolished) are named for William Duncan's son Henry Duncan. David Duncan's Moatfield was relocated to current site in 1986.

Graydon Hall is named after Henry Rupert Bain's Graydon Manor, built in 1938.

== Education ==
One public school boards operate schools in Graydon Hall, the secular English first language Toronto District School Board (TDSB). TDSB operates one school elementary school, and one secondary school in the neighbourhood, Rene Gordon Elementary School, and George S. Henry Academy. Both schools were originally opened by the North York Board of Education, a predecessor of TDSB.

In addition to TDSB, three other public school boards also offer schooling to residents of Graydon Hall, although they do not operate schools in the neighbourhood. The Toronto Catholic District School Board is a separate school board, whereas Conseil scolaire catholique MonAvenir, and Conseil scolaire Viamonde are French first language school board, the former being a separate school board, the latter being a secular school board. Students of these school boards attend institutions situated in other neighbourhoods in Toronto.

The neighbourhood is also home to Bayview Glen School, a private school situated in the western portion of the neighbourhood.

== Recreation ==
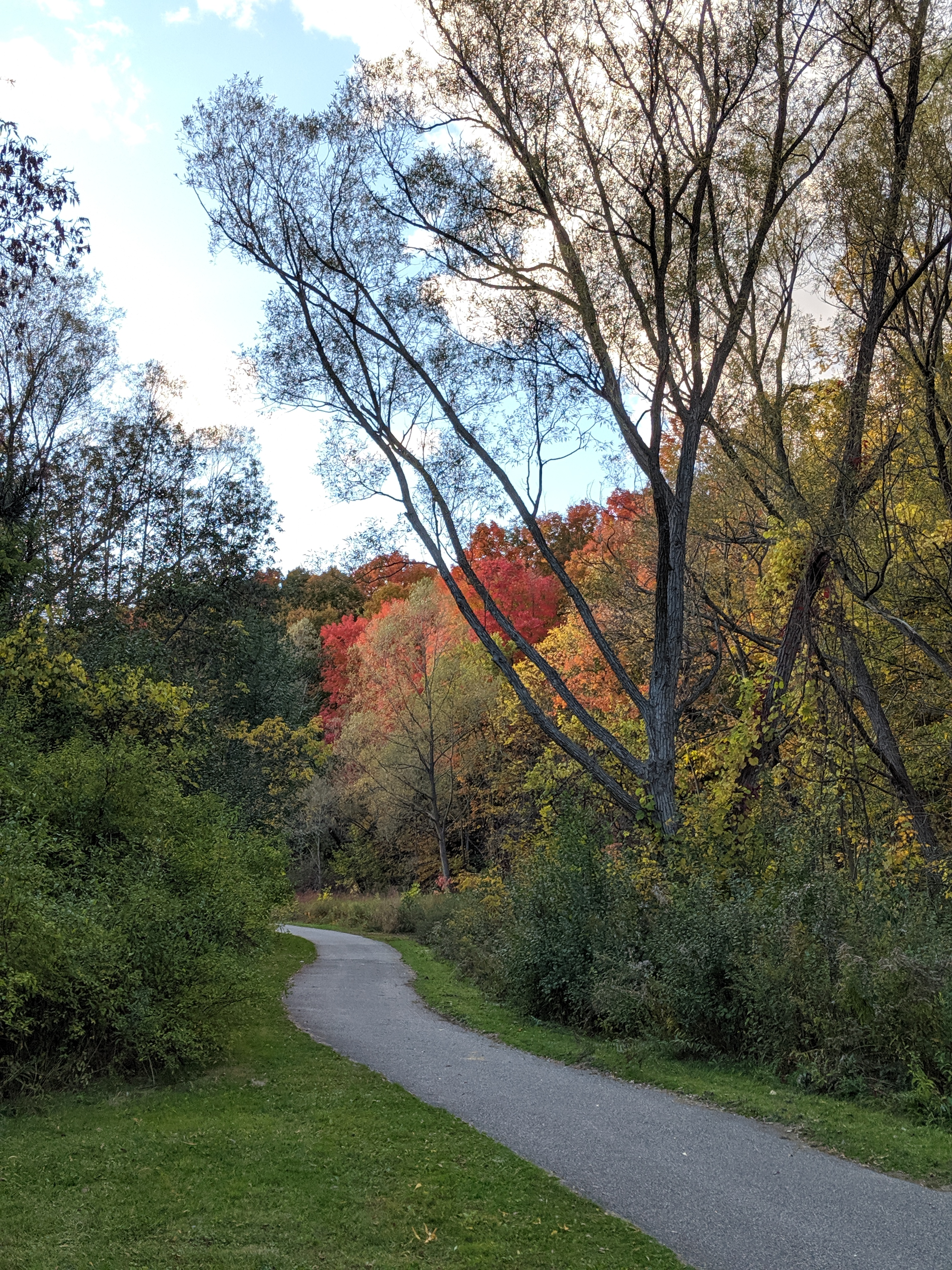
Betty Sutherland Trail Park is a municipal park in the neighbourhood.

Several municipal parks are located in the neighbourhood, including Betty Sutherland Trail Park, Duncan Mill Greenbelt, and Graydon Hall Park. Municipal parks in the neighbourhood are managed by the Toronto Parks, Forestry and Recreation Division. Parks like the Betty Sutherland Trail Park are situated within the Don Valley. The valley itself forms a part of the Toronto ravine system.
