= Lansing, Toronto =

Coordinates: 43.757°N 79.417°W

Lansing
- Neighbourhood
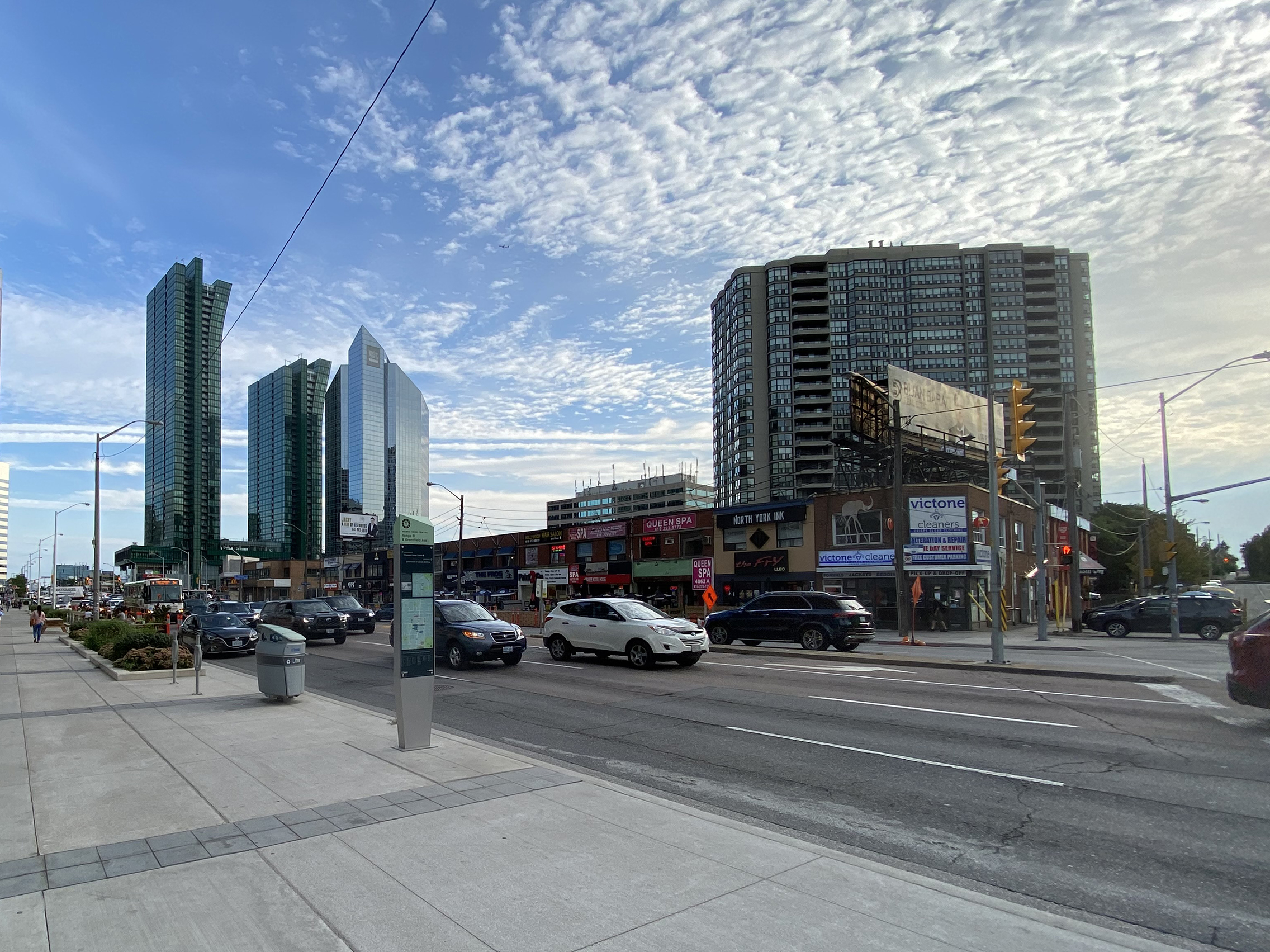
- View of Lansing from Sheppard Avenue and Yonge Street in 2021

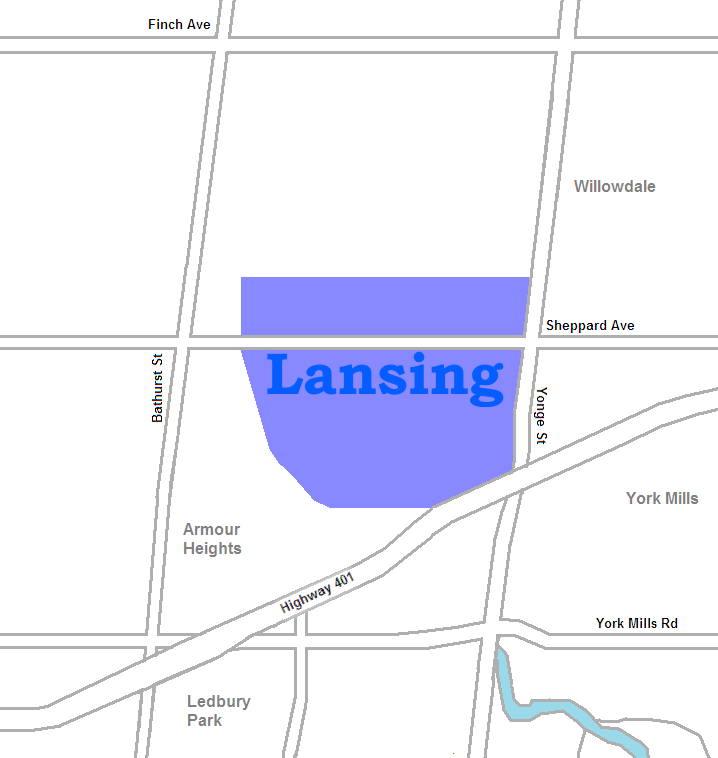
- Country: Canada
- Province: Ontario
- City: Toronto
- Municipality established: 1850 York Township
- Changed municipality: 1922 North York from York Township
- Changed municipality: 1998 Toronto from North York

Lansing is a neighbourhood in Toronto, Ontario, Canada. It originated as a minor settlement of a store, other services, and a post office at the corner of Yonge Street and Sheppard Avenue, was later designated a postal village, and was finally consolidated with its fellow postal villages, Newtonbrook and Willowdale, into a new postal village named Willowdale within the Township of North York. For neighbourhood planning purposes, the City of Toronto, which North York was amalgamated into in 1998, labels Lansing as Lansing-Westgate. Its boundaries are Yonge Street to the east, Highway 401 to the south, Bathurst Street to the west, and Burnett Avenue to the north.

== History ==
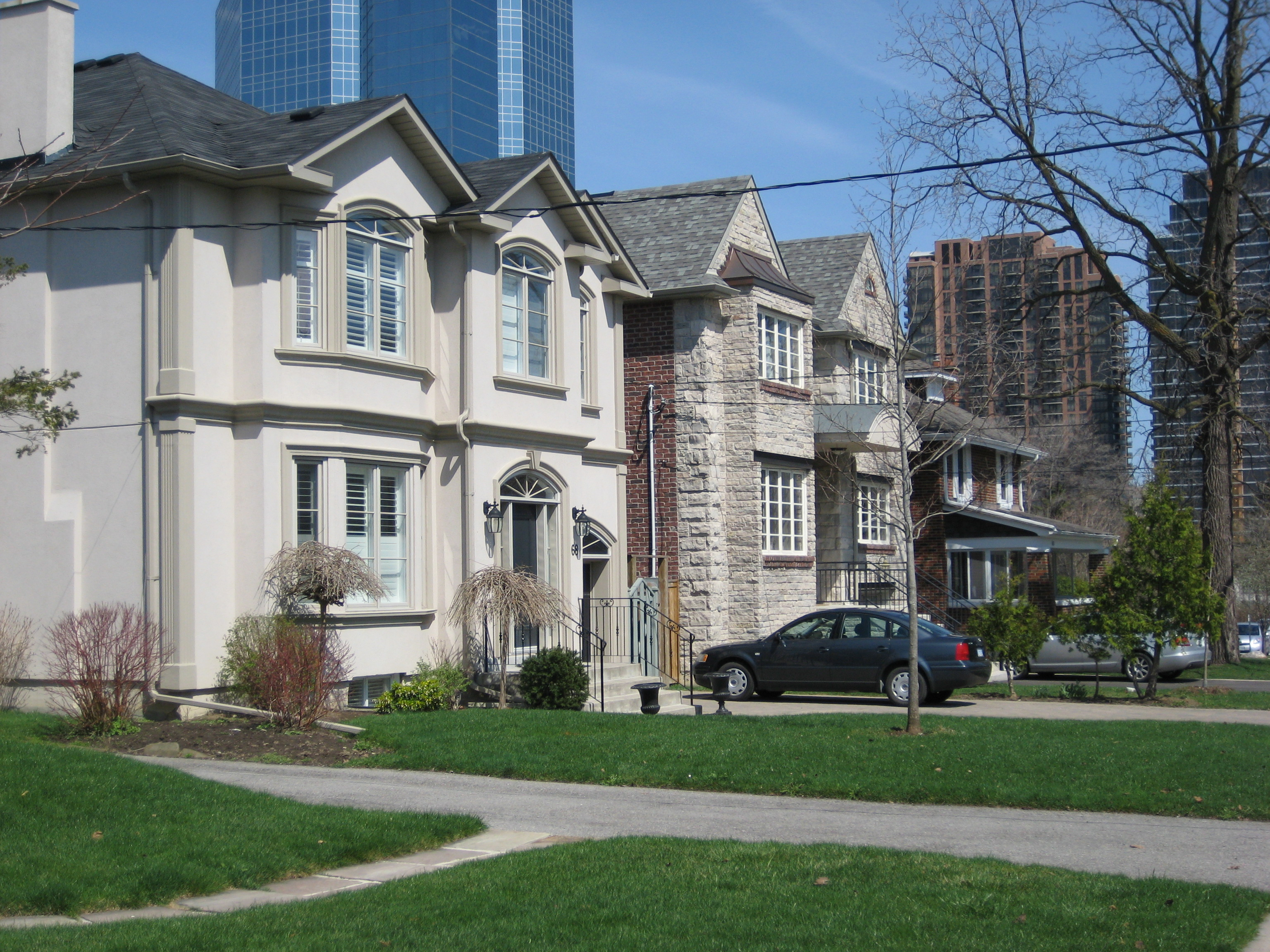
Lansing has developed into a residential neighbourhood.

The postal village of Lansing was from Elmwood Avenue in the north to approximately the current location of Highway 401 in the south and Bathurst Street in the west to Bayview Avenue in the east with the actual post office located at the northwest corner of Yonge Street and Sheppard Avenue where a grocery store and other services were located. The postal village name was provided by Joseph Shepard's daughter Saida. The postal village of Lansing with those boundaries remained in existence until the post office at Lansing corner was closed upon the completion of a new post office to the north in Willowdale and the two villages were merged into a new postal village of Willowdale, within the Township of York. Over time, the area east of Yonge Street which was formerly part of the Lansing postal village was developed into residential suburbs and came to be considered part of Willowdale instead of Lansing.

The Lansing area was developed into a residential neighbourhood of mostly single-family owned and occupied homes between 1910 and the 1950s. In the older portions nearest Yonge Street the homes are one- and two-storey pre-war houses while in the newest areas homes consist of modest one-and-a-half-storey postwar houses. Lansing is generally filled with two distinct types of households, the first being older couples, usually with adult children, living in post-war bungalows, and the second being younger wealthy families living in "rebuilds" in which wealthy families buy one or two bungalows, tear them down and build two-million-dollar houses.

Opened in 1948, York Cemetery is located to the north of the neighbourhood. Several notable individuals are interred there, including the Grand Duchess Olga Alexandrovna of Russia, and Tim Horton.

== Demographics ==
According to the Canada 2006 Census:

- Immigrants - 44%
- Visible Minority - 37%
- Chinese - 11%
- Korean - 6%
- West Asian - 5%
- South Asian - 5%
- Latin American - 3%
- Filipino - 2%
- Black - 2%

== Education ==
Two public school boards operate elementary schools in Lansing. The separate Toronto Catholic District School Board (TCDSB) operates St. Edward Catholic School, whereas the secular Toronto District School Board (TDSB) operates Cameron Public School

Neither school board operates a secondary school in the neighbourhood, with secondary school students residing in Lansing attending institutions in adjacent neighbourhoods. The French first language public secular school board, Conseil scolaire Viamonde, and its separate counterpart, Conseil scolaire catholique MonAvenir also offer schooling to applicable residents of Lansing, although they do not operate a school in the neighbourhood. CSCM and CSV students attend schools situated in other neighbourhoods in Toronto.

== Recreation ==
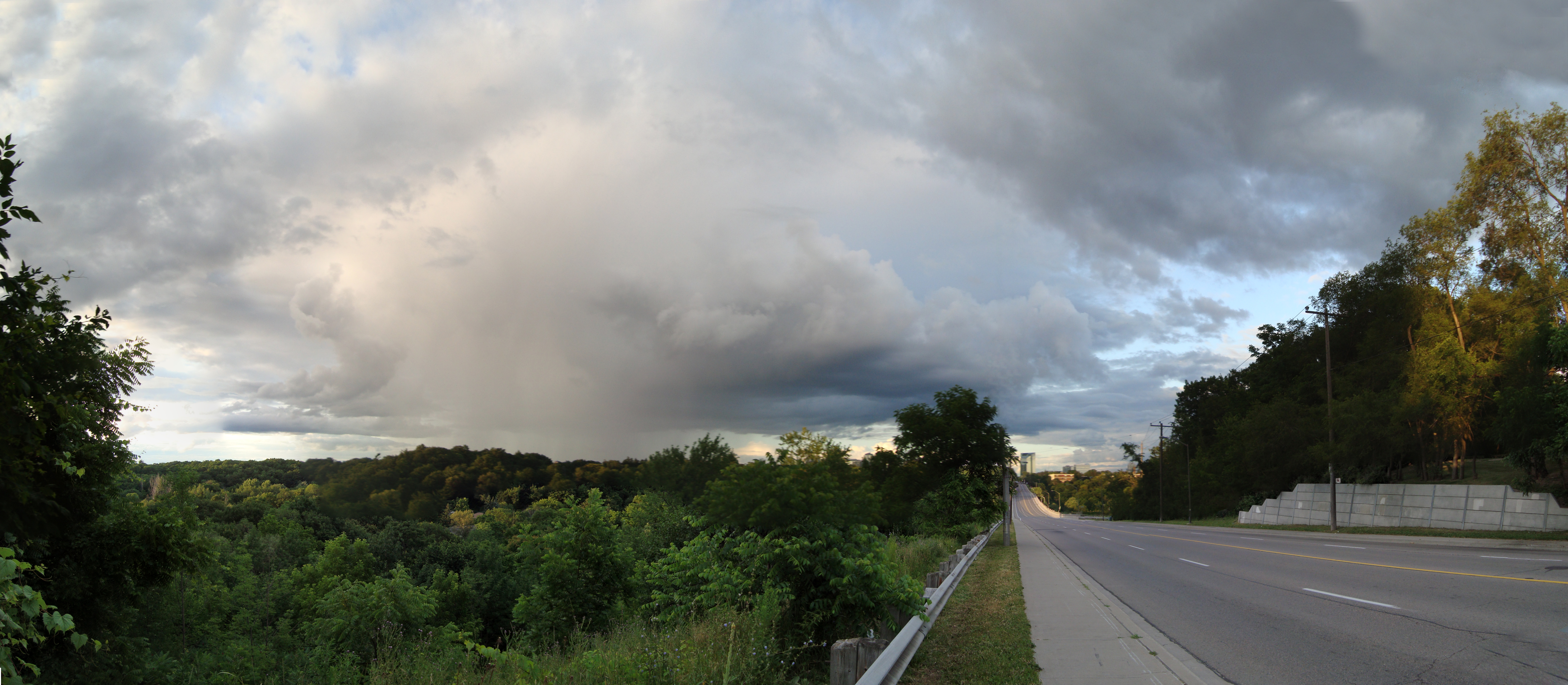
View of Earl Bales Park from Sheppard Avenue.

Lansing is home to several municipal parks, including the Addington Greenbelt, Earl Bales Park, the Hinder Area (formerly known as the West Don Parkland and informally known as the Hinder Property), Gwendolen Park, and the Stuart Greenbelt. Most of these parks are situated near the Don Valley, which forms a part of the larger Toronto ravine system. Earl Bales Park also operates a ski hill during the winter. Municipal parks in Lansing are managed by the Toronto Parks, Forestry and Recreation Division. In addition to municipal parks, the division also manages a community centre in the neighbourhood, Earl Bales Community Centre.

The northeastern portion of the neighbourhood, along Yonge Street is also home to several restaurants retail outlets, forming a part of North York City Centre, the central business district for North York.

== Transportation ==
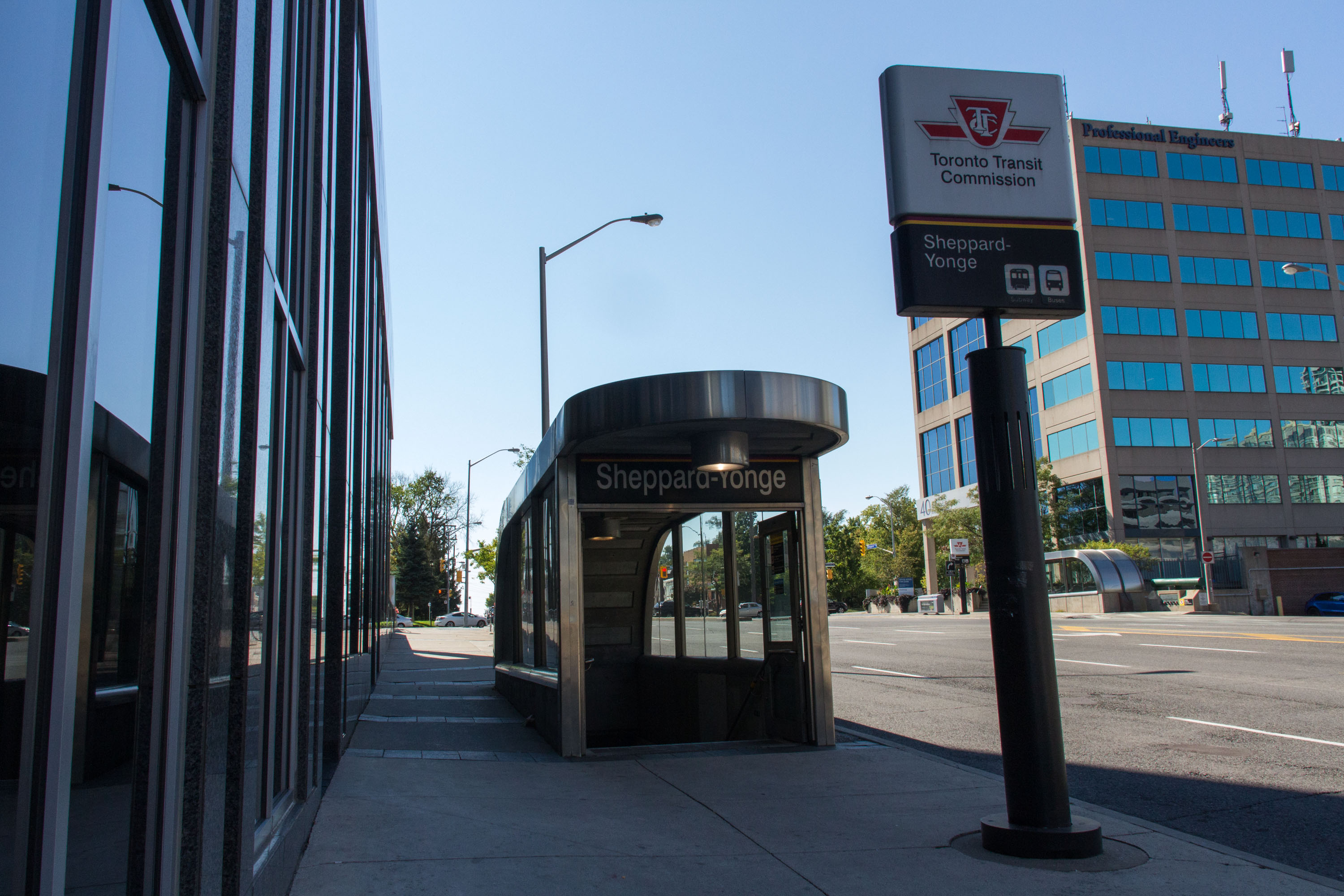
Sidewalk entrance to Sheppard-Yonge station, a subway station in Lansing

Several major roadways bound the neighbourhood to the east, and south. Yonge Street, is a major north-south thoroughfare, that bounds the neighbourhood to the east. Highway 401 is a major east-west controlled access highway that bounds the neighbourhood to the south. Other major roadways in the neighbourhood include the east-west Sheppard Avenue. Bathurst Street is located west of the neighbourhood.

Public transportation in Lansing is provided by the Toronto Transit Commission (TTC). TTC operates several bus routes, as well as the Toronto subway system. One subway station is situated in the neighbourhood, Sheppard–Yonge station. The station provides access to two subway lines, Line 1 Yonge–University, and Line 4 Sheppard. Regional commuter buses operated by GO Transit are also accessible from the station.
