= St. Lawrence Market North =

Public market in Toronto, Ontario, Canada

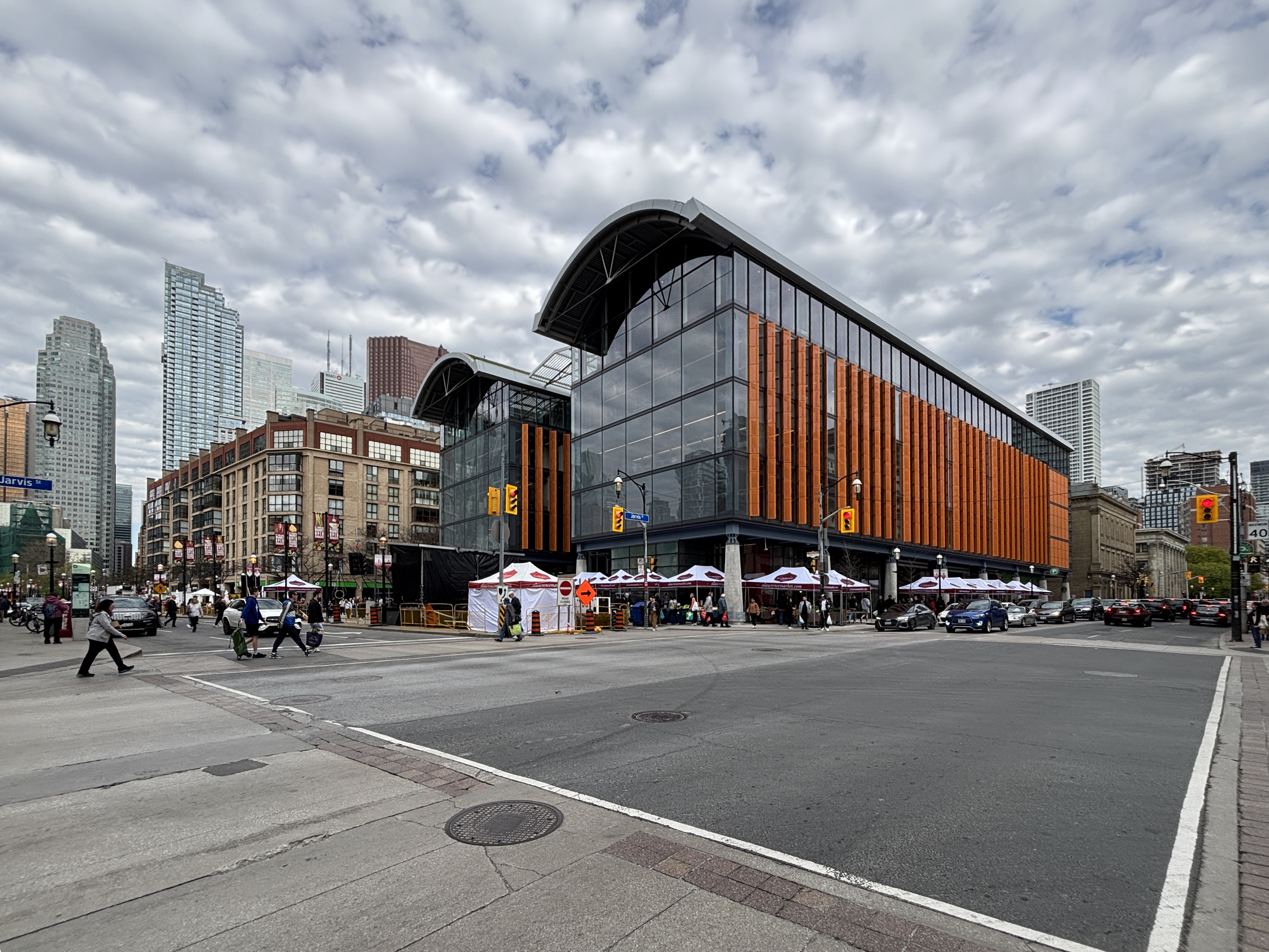
- St. Lawrence Market North in May, 2025
- Interactive map of the St. Lawrence Market North area

General information
- Location: 92 Front Street East, Toronto, Canada
- Coordinates: 43°38′59″N 79°22′19″W
- Completed: 2025; 1 year ago
- Owner: City of Toronto

Technical details
- Floor count: 5
- Floor area: 10,000 square feet (930 m^{2})

St. Lawrence Market North is a public market in Toronto, Ontario, Canada. It hosts a variety of markets, including a farmers' market, an antique market and Christmas trees daily from mid-November to December 24. It also houses municipally-run courts. The site has been a farmer's market since 1803. Several buildings have been built for the Market North. The 1968 Market North structure was demolished in 2015 and reconstructed in 2025. The St. Lawrence Market combines the North building, the St. Lawrence Hall and the St. Lawrence Market South building.

== History ==
A market has operated at King St. and Jarvis St. since the area was designated the "Market Block" by Upper Canada Lieutenant-Governor Peter Hunter in 1803. The first permanent farmers' market building was built on the south side of King Street at Jarvis Street shortly after. It was enclosed in 1820 and replaced by a brick structure in 1831. This new building extended from King to Front and housed an assembly hall on the upper level. City Council met in this assembly hall from 1834 to 1845. It was damaged in the 1849 great fire along with much of the adjacent area (but not the City Hall). A remnant of the 1831 building, a stone drainage tunnel, was discovered in the 2015–17 archaeological excavations.

A new building was built in 1851 abutting the new St. Lawrence Hall on King Street but with its main entrance facing Front Street. This building lasted until 1904 when it was demolished by order of the Market Commission and replaced by a building designed to match the recently completed South building. A canopy ran over Front Street connecting the north and south markets until it was removed in 1954.

A new one-storey north market building was built in 1968 and was in operation until 2015, when the market moved to a temporary facility at 125 The Esplanade.

The Farmers' Market, the largest in Toronto, is held on Saturdays starting at 5 am. The Sunday Antique Market operated weekly for 31 years until 2022 when the owner relocated it to Small Arms Munitions Building (Arsenal Lands) at Lakeshore Park in Mississauga, Ontario in protest of the city's decision to close Market Street to vehicular traffic. A Sunday Variety Market and New Antique Market have replaced it. There is also an outdoor Christmas trees and holiday green market offered daily from mid-November to December 24.

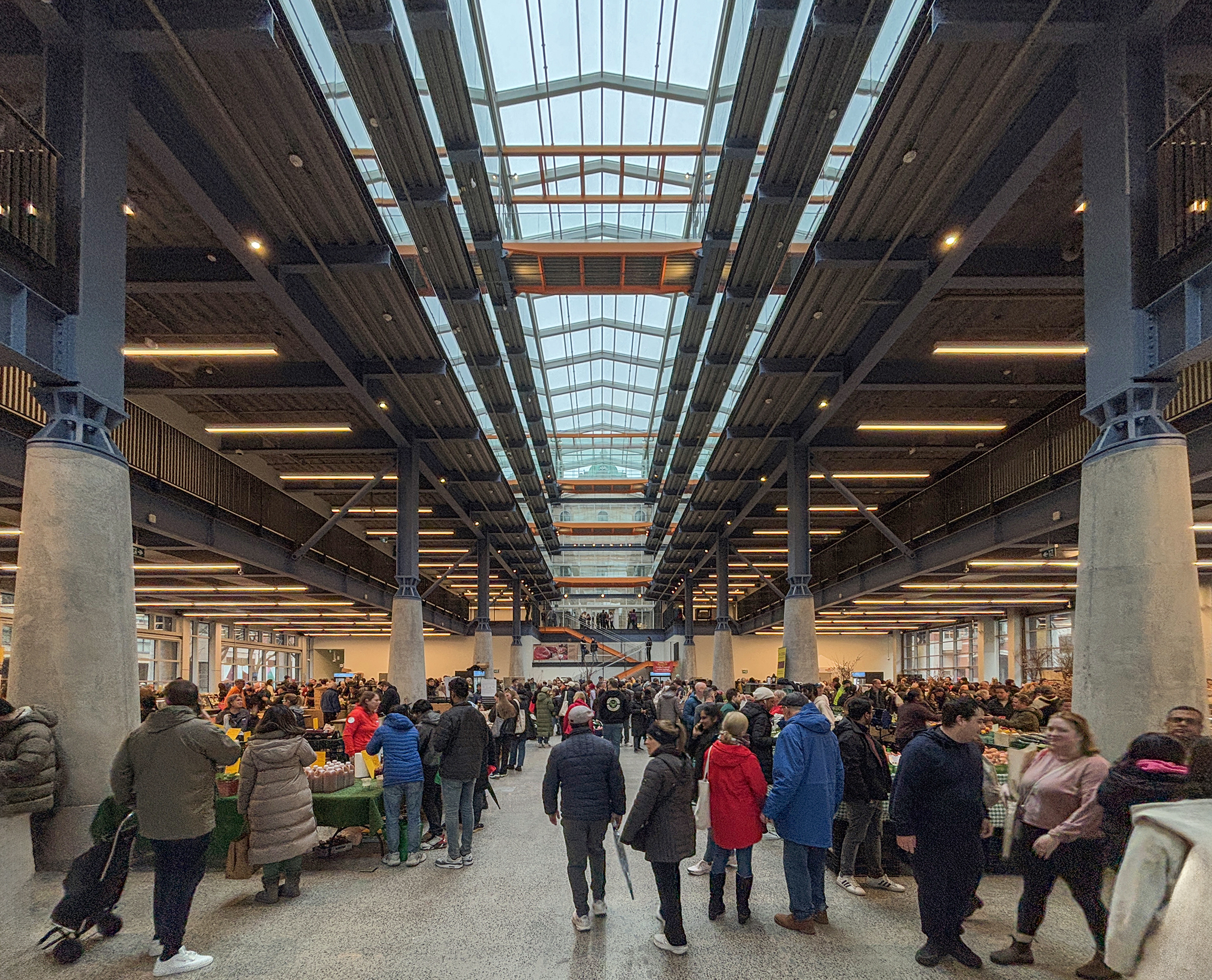
Market interior

In the early 2000s, the City of Toronto did a review of the Market's operations and determined that the North building would have to be replaced. The City held an architectural competition for a new building to be used for the same purposes as the old one. On June 7, 2010, then-Mayor David Miller announced the winners of the design competition for a building to replace the existing North Market. The winning design was by Rogers Stirk Harbour + Partners in a joint venture with Adamson Associates. Richard Rogers of the Rogers Stirk Harbour + Partners architectural firm is also responsible for Paris' Centre Georges Pompidou (also known as the Pompidou Centre). The proposed new building was four stories tall and would feature an arcade and will be a complex of three buildings. The new building includes office space which will be used for municipal courts and a 250-space parking garage underground. The project schedule first envisioned a completion in 2018.

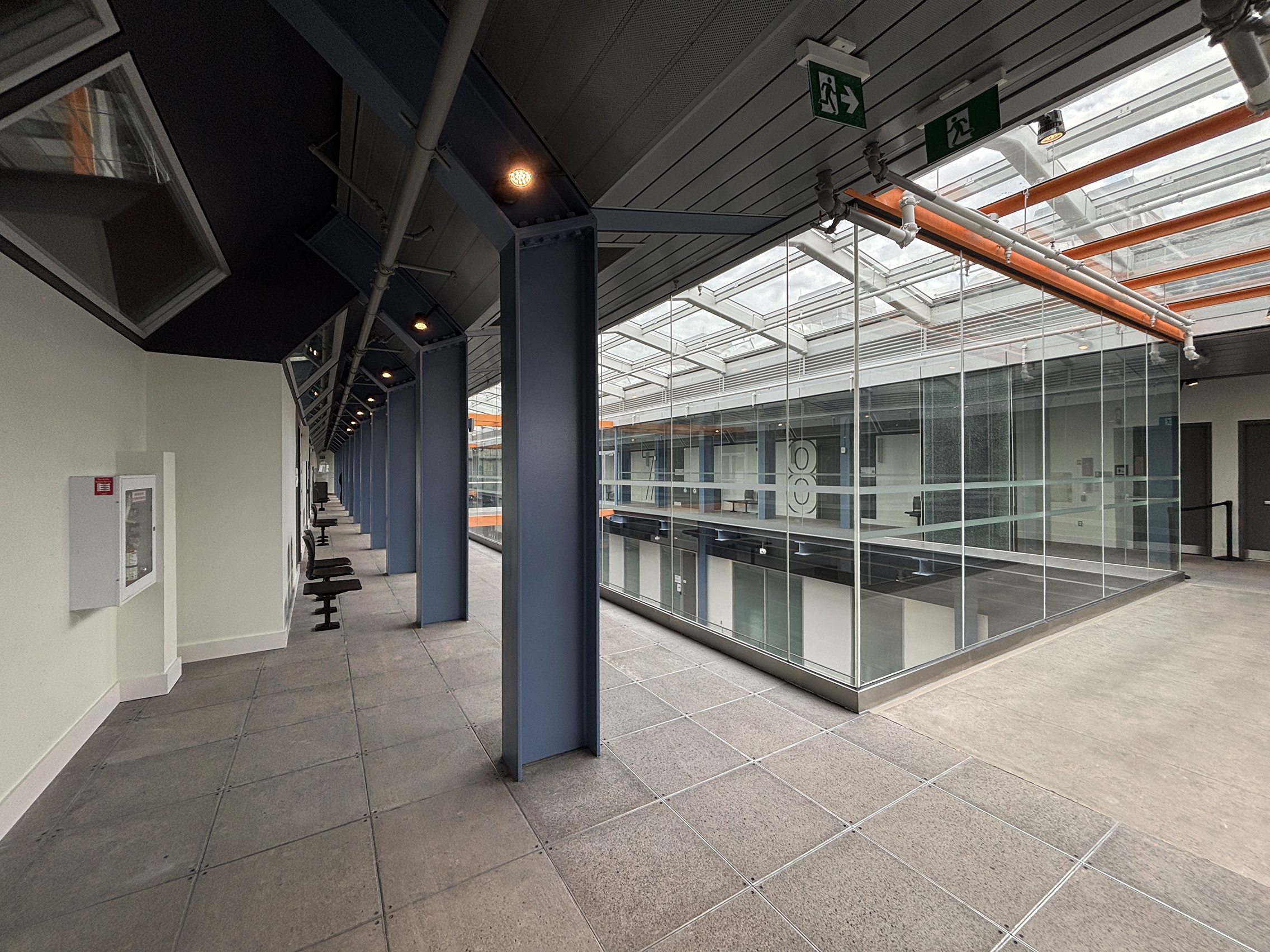
Level 5 municipal courts access

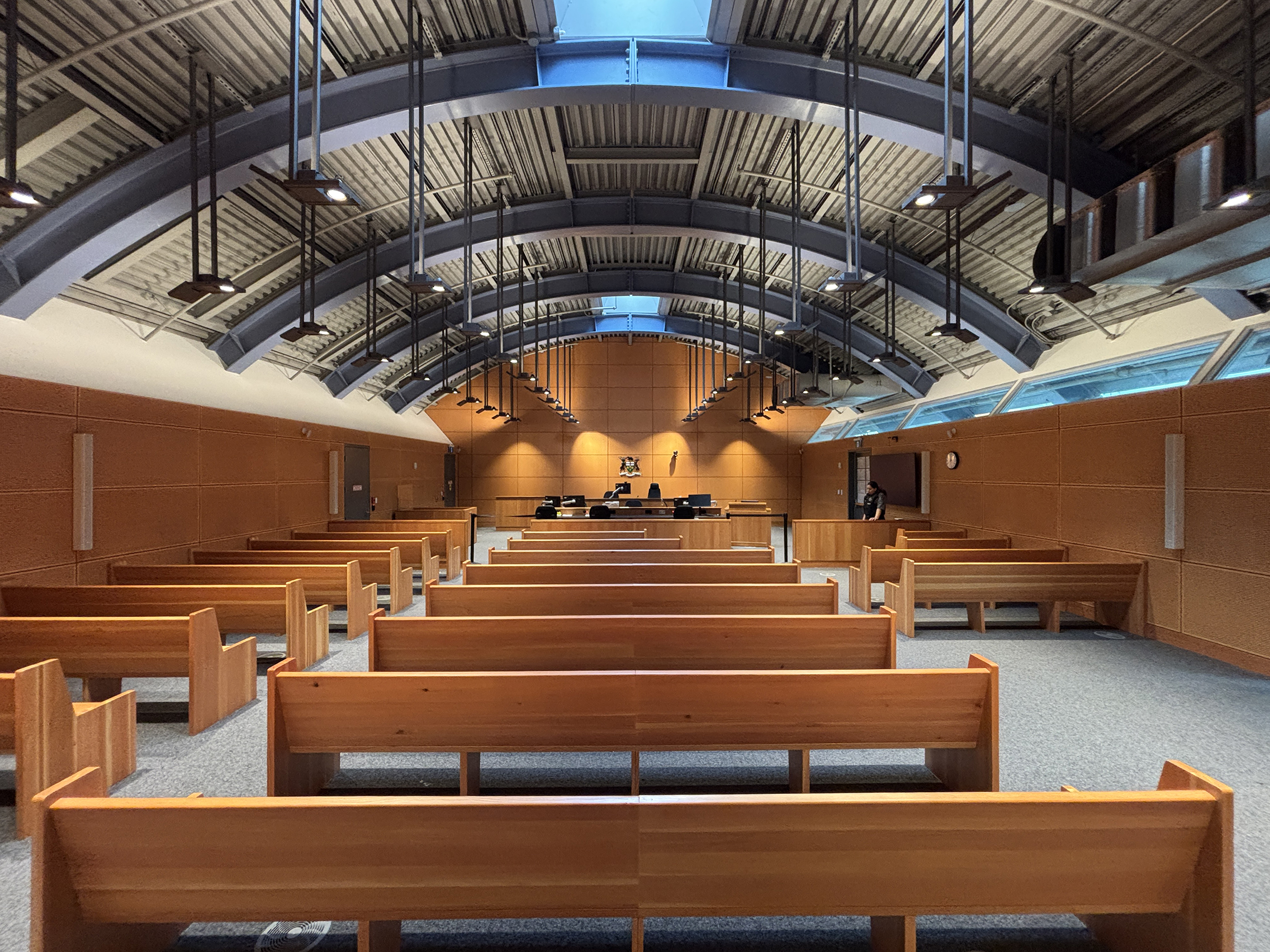
Level 5 municipal courts interior

The 1968 building was slated to be demolished late 2010, but City Council balked at the escalating cost of the project. This led to changes to the design to reduce the cost. The updated design is for a five-story building with a central atrium, connected to St. Lawrence Hall. The ground floor is 4,000 square metres (43,000 ft^{2}) and the building will also have 4,000 square metres (43,000 ft^{2}) of office space and 3,000 square metres (32,000 ft^{2}) of space for courts. In 2013, City Council approved an overall project budget of CA$91.5 million. After the temporary site was built in 2015, the 1968 North building was closed.

The City commissioned archaeological studies on the site, to determine if there was anything archaeologically significant present on the site, which was first developed in 1804. Artifacts were found by excavating part of the foundation in 2015, including sewer brickworks, foundations and cellars. The finds meant that a further in-depth study was required. This study was done after the demolition of the 1968 building, which occurred in 2016. The team led by Peter Popkin, senior archaeologist with Golder Associates, found various artefacts, including knives, ceramics and butchers’ hooks. An exhibit on the archaeological dig was presented at the Market Gallery in the south building.

During the construction of the new building, the Saturday and Sunday North Market vendors are selling from a location (Green P parking lot) one block south on the Esplanade. The vendors vacated the North building in June 2015 to allow for demolition and re-development of a new market structure. The temporary market is located in a single storey pre-fabricated fabric structure on the parking lot south of the South Market Building at 125 The Esplanade opened on July 11, 2015. The temporary site will be used pending the completion of the permanent structure on Front Street.

An award of the contract to build the building was finally made in 2018, but rescinded later in the year when the recommended contractor failed to meet the requirements of the tender. On May 15, 2019, City Council approved the awarding of a contract for construction to Buttcon Limited / The Atlas Corporation Joint Venture. Construction restarted on July 9, 2019. The market was expected to be completed in summer 2023 but later revised to fall 2024. Eight municipally-run provincial offence courts relocated from Old City Hall to St. Lawrence Market North in March 2025. The farmer's market relocated from a temporary structure to the new building on April 5, 2025. The official grand opening of the building occurred on May 10, 2025.

== Market Lane Park ==
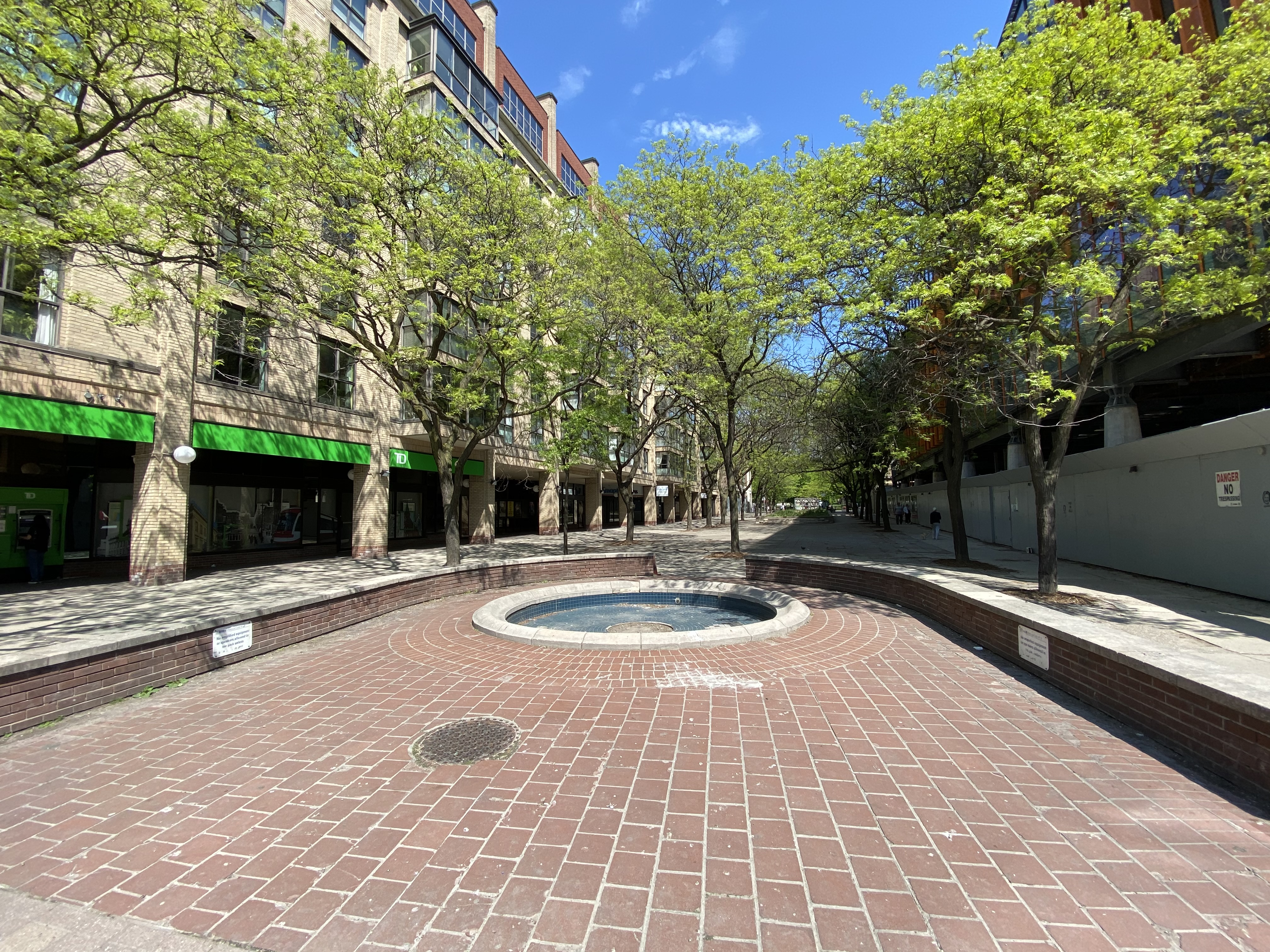
Market Lane Park

Market Lane Park' is located on the west side of the North Market Building and St. Lawrence Hall. With the closure of (formerly West Market as well as Market Square as Market Street ran on southside - now known as The Esplanade) Market Street between King and Front Streets, under City of Toronto By-laws 291-67 and 40-70, the area was converted to pedestrian use only. Additional landscaping features like water fountain (south end at Front Street), rows of trees, flower beds and sculpture (at north end on King Street) have been added. Market Square condominium buildings were constructed along the westerly boundary in the early 1980s.

The park will remain after the demolition and after the new North Market is built and will be upgraded starting in 2025.

== See also ==
- St Lawrence Market South - the public market associated with Market North
- St Lawrence Hall - culture venue linked to Market North
- Kensington Market - not a traditional market but rather a multicultural neighbourhood and former Jewish enclave
- St. Patrick's Market - former public market prior to 2011 and later as food venue (closed in 2017 and site shuttered by City since 2018)
- St. Andrew's Market and Playground - former market and since re-developed into city park and mixed used building
