= St. Lawrence Market South =

Coordinates: 43°38′56″N 79°22′18″W

St. Lawrence Market South Building
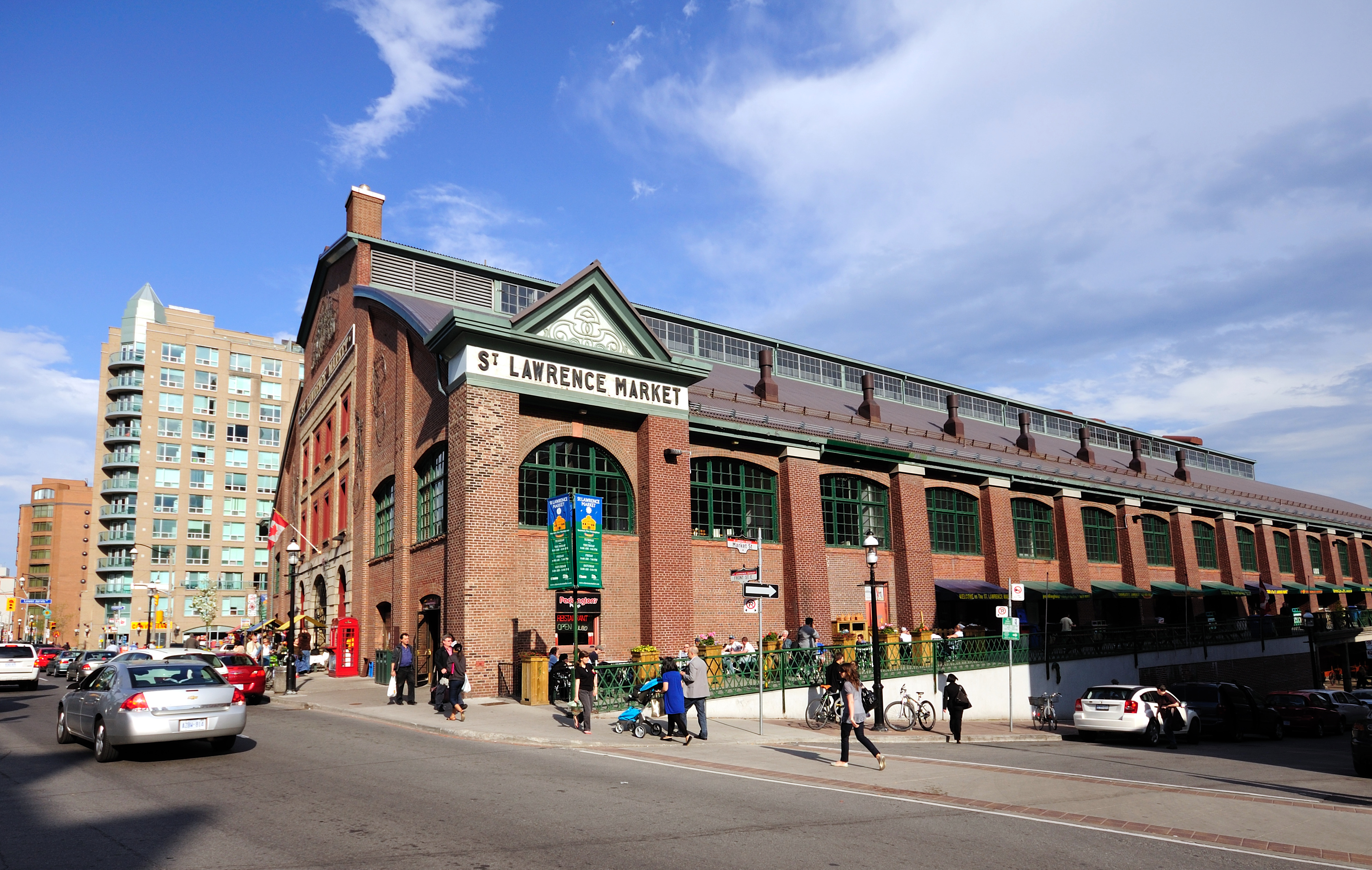
- View from the north of Front and Market Street

General information
- Type: Public market
- Location: 92 Front Street East, Toronto, Canada
- Opened: 1845 (as city hall and municipal complex); 1902 (as public market)
- Renovated: 1972
- Owner: City of Toronto government

Technical details
- Floor count: 2 +2(former city building)
- Floor area: 111,458 square feet (10,354.8 m^{2})

Design and construction
- Architects: Henry Bowyer Lane (1845 building); John Wilson Siddall (1902 rebuild)

The St. Lawrence Market South building is a major public market building in Toronto, Ontario, Canada. It is located on the southwest corner of Front and Lower Jarvis Streets. Along with the St. Lawrence Market North and St. Lawrence Hall, it comprises the St. Lawrence Market complex. The current building was opened in 1902, incorporating the 1845 Toronto City Hall building into the structure. The building was restored during the 1970s.

== Description ==
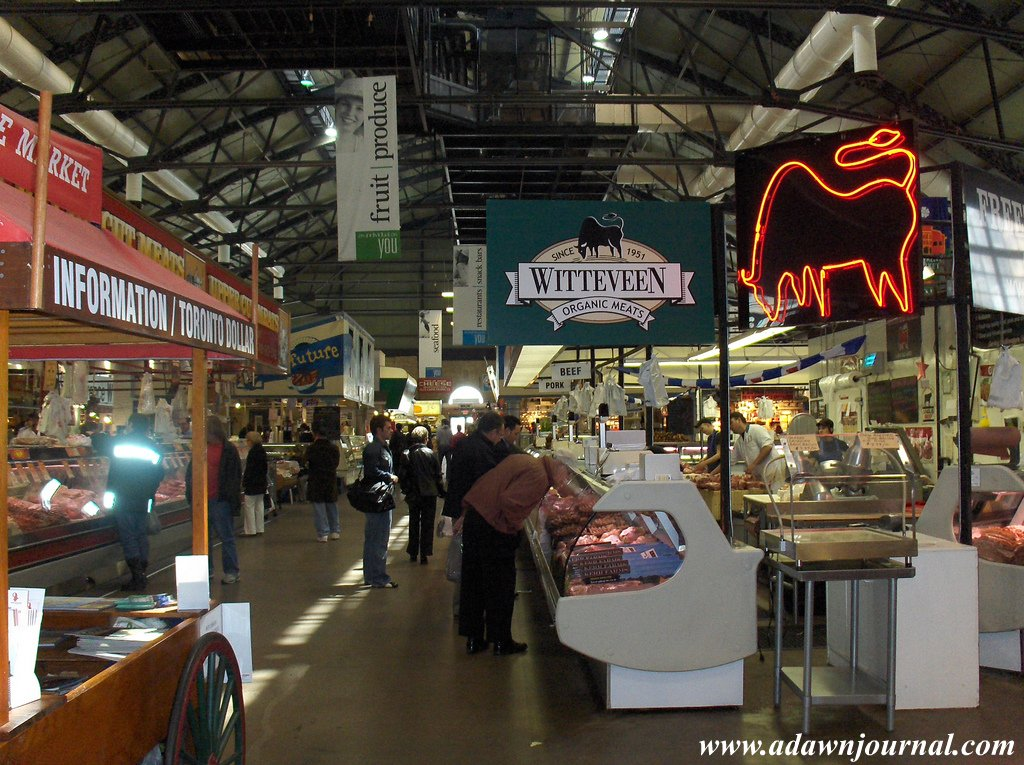
Vendors on the upper level of St. Lawrence Market North

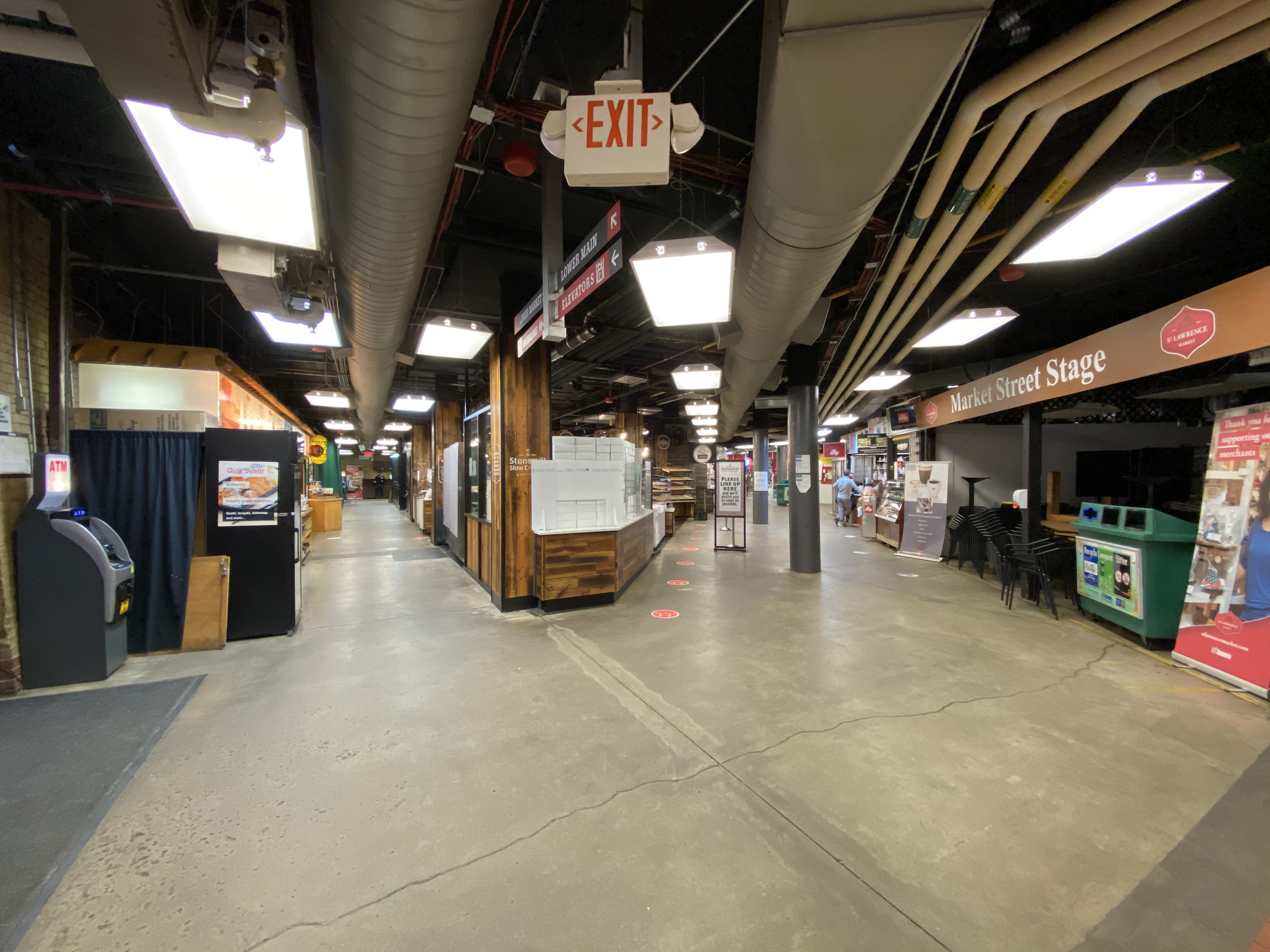
Lower level of St. Lawrence Market South

The building has two main floors. The upper floor is the primary space and it extends through the full length of the building. It is one large open space with a large overhanging roof structure, and windows on each side. The lower level is partly underground, opening to the outdoors on the south end of the building. The lower floor does not extend the full length of the building. The market is located on the edge of the former lake shore, and the elevation drops over 10 feet (3.0 m) between the north and south ends. The south end of the lower floor opens to ground level at The Esplanade street. Surrounding the building along the east, west and south sides is a mezzanine, where seating and tables are available.

On the upper floor, over 50 vendors sell fruits, vegetables, meats and cheeses daily, while the lower floor has a portion that is non-food. Each vendor has an allotted stall space and there are several aisles. Several stalls sell sandwiches, such as the staple back bacon sandwich, and beverages such as coffee and tea. There are also craft and art vendors and kitchen supplies.

At the north end is a remnant of the old City Hall, providing two small upper floors. It houses the Market Gallery, operated by the City of Toronto, on the second floor and a cooking school (The Market Kitchen) on the mezzanine floor. Opened in 1979, the Market Gallery offers changing exhibitions dedicated to Toronto's history, art and culture, and programs for school and community groups. The gallery space was formerly the 19th century city council chamber from 1845 to 1899.

Free Wi-Fi is available throughout the South Market building, provided by Wireless Toronto.

The North Market, temporarily located south of the South Market due to the construction of a new building, houses a farmers' market each Saturday featuring 43 vendors inside the building and numerous cart vendors outside of the building, and an antiques market on Sundays.

== History ==
The building was once home to Toronto's first permanent city hall and jailhouse from 1845 to 1899. It was designed by English immigrant architect Henry Bowyer Lane, who also designed Little Trinity Church in 1843, Holy Trinity Church in 1847, and expansion of Osgoode Hall in 1844. Lane's design was chosen over those submitted by William Thomas, John Tully and John George Howard. Lane incorporated into his design contrasting red brick and white stone in the Georgian architecture tradition. A “cupola” was built on the top front side of the building with a clock. Two-storey wings extended on either side of a three-story center block and housed the offices of city staff and shops on the ground floor. The centre block contained the Council Chambers, Toronto Police Station # 1 and a jail in the basement. It was built at a cost of $52,000. At the time, the south end of the building was on the lake front.

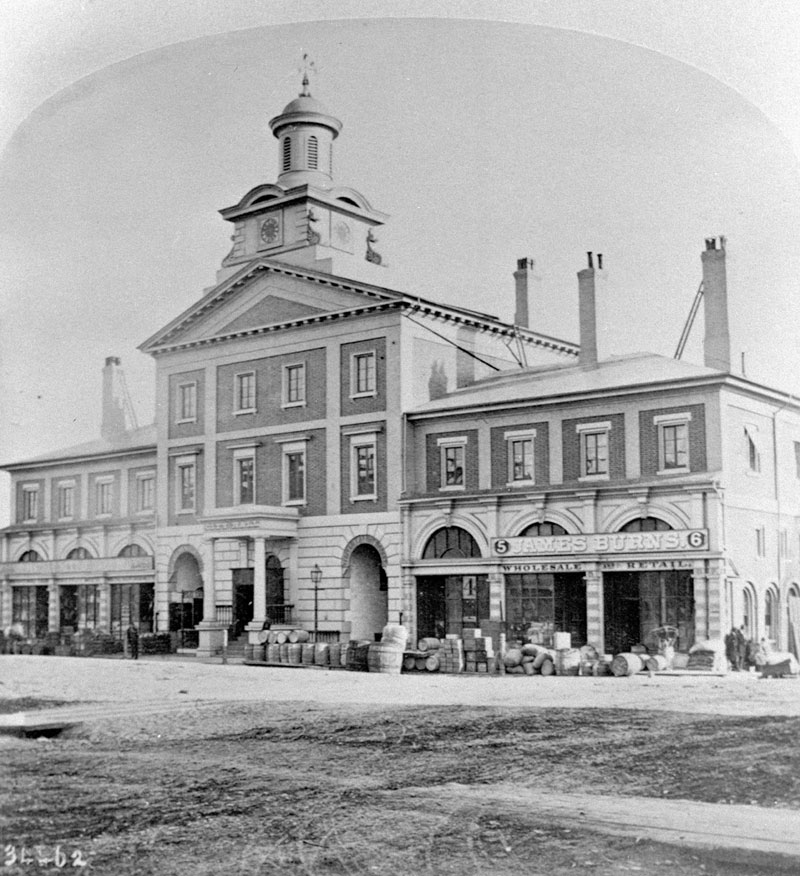
New Market House in 1868. From 1845 to 1899, the building was used as Toronto's city hall.

The "New Market House" was used as Toronto City Hall from 1845-1899. The yellow brick outline of the center part of that building can still be seen today in the front facade of the current building. The City Hall was renovated in 1851 by William Thomas, with new shops in the wings, keystones in the arched windows and improvements to the police station and jail cells (which were reportedly subject to flooding). More improvements were made between 1868 and 1872 by Henry Langley, who designed many churches and public buildings including the Metropolitan United Church. Railway lines were located on infill as the shoreline moved further south of the building.

In 1899, the City of Toronto decided to vacate the facility and move to a new city hall located on Queen Street West and Bay Street designed by E. J. Lennox. A Market Commission recommended the old city hall be renovated and turned into a large marketplace. John William Siddall was the selected architect for this project. Siddall decided to demolish the cupola, the pediment, and the side wings. The new steel truss roof was proposed to cover the entire building structure, allowing more open space with a high ceiling and more natural light. The roof is hybrid of arch roof with clerestory. The North Market was also rebuilt at this time and had a similar design to the current South building with late Victorian architecture design. The two buildings were joined with a glass canopy over Front Street. The South building opened in 1902 and the new North building opened in 1904.

In 1971, a consultant recommended the market be demolished. Time and Place, a citizens' group, proposed a renovation and that the former Council Chamber be converted into a "City display space." The renovations lasted from 1974 to 1978 and included the opening up of the basement for retail use, a new floor for the main level, installation of a freight elevator and new doors to accommodate increased pedestrian traffic. The renovated Council Chambers opened as the Market Gallery, an exhibition facility to showcase the City's extensive archival and art collections, on March 7, 1979.

== In literature ==
The St. Lawrence Market neighbourhood is featured extensively in the novel Old City Hall, by Robert Rotenberg.

== See also ==
- Kensington Market
- St. Patrick's Market
- St. Andrew's Market and Playground
- West Don Lands
- Ontario Food Terminal

Preceded by Temporary space at Market Square (1834-1844)	Toronto City Hall; 1845–1899	Succeeded by Old City Hall (Toronto)
