= Great Fire of Toronto (1849) =

Multi-city block fire

Coordinates: 43.6508°N 79.3735°W

King Street looking west from Jarvis Street prior to 1849. All buildings to the right of the tree were destroyed by the fire. The first building on the left, the former City Hall, was damaged as were some of the buildings to the west.

The Great Fire of Toronto of 1849, April 7, 1849, also known as the Cathedral Fire, was the first major fire in the history of Toronto, Ontario, Canada. Much of the Market Block, the business core of the city, was wiped out, including the predecessor of the current St. James Cathedral. The 1831 building of the Toronto City Hall and St. Lawrence Market south of King was damaged and was torn down.

== Background ==
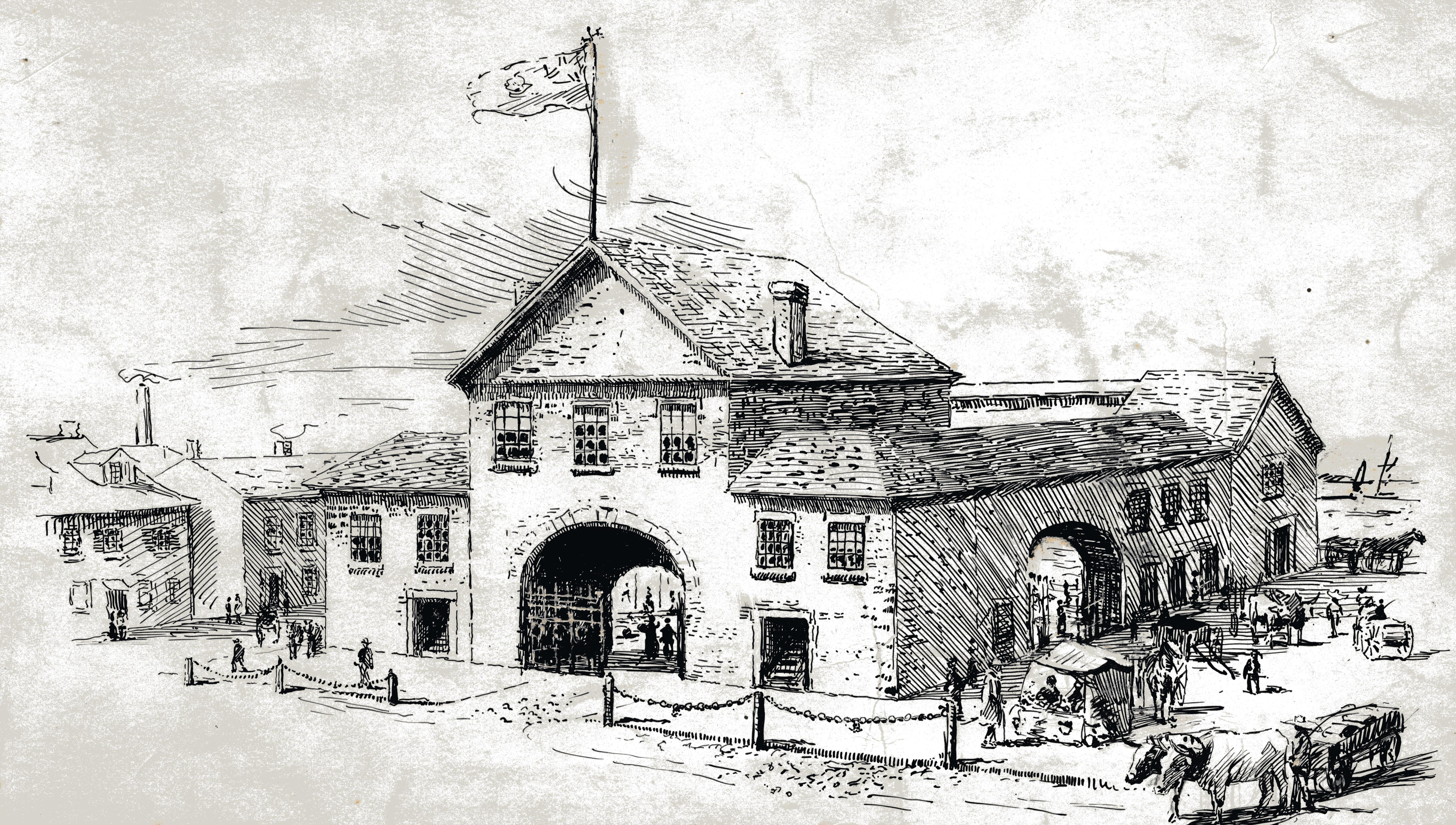
1831 City Hall and market building at King and Nelson (Jarvis)

Before the fire, Toronto's fire-fighting capabilities were limited to six volunteer companies operating in one fire hall at Court Street and Church Street. Manual pumpers and tankers involved far too much manpower and would prove to be no match for the speed of a major fire. The fire halls existing in Toronto in 1849 were:

- Fireman's Hall on Church Street south of Adelaide Street East (Newgate) - Built 1826 and renumbered as Fire Hall Number 5 in 1861; it was closed in 1874.
- Fire Hall Number 1 at 139-141 Bay Street - Built 1841 and closed by Toronto Fire Department in 1924.
- Engine Number 4 at St. Patrick's Market on Queen Street West - Built 1842 and closed 1861.
- Fire Hose Company Number 2 at Berkeley Street - Built 1849 and closed 1859.

A second Fireman's Hall at Bay Street had been built in 1839, but it had closed in 1841, some eight years before the fire.

== Fire ==
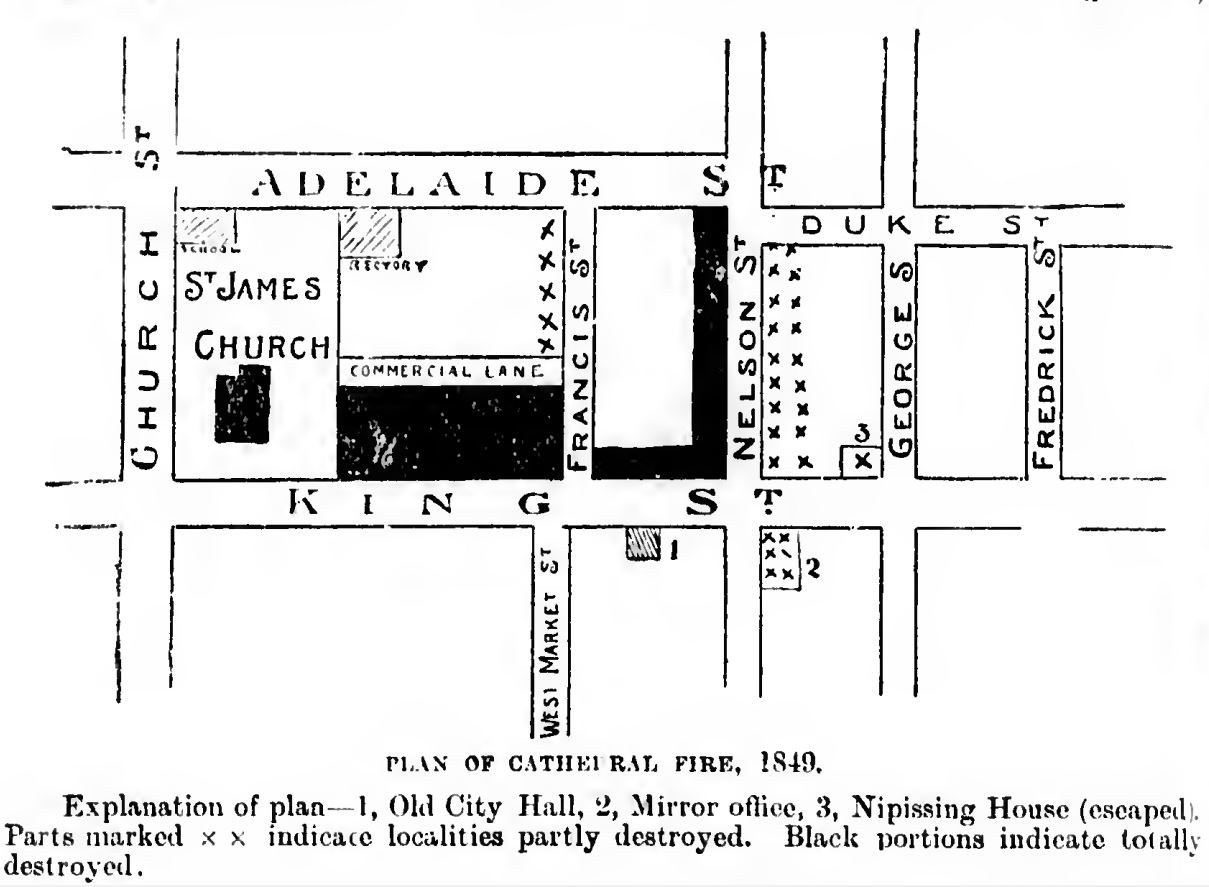
Area of cathedral fire in 1849

The fire was discovered at 1 a.m. in outhouses to the rear of Graham's Tavern on the north-east side of King Street and Nelson Street (Jarvis Street) at George, behind Post's Tavern. The fire consumed Post's Tavern then burned through the outbuildings north to Duke Street. The fire spread through the whole block, destroying the Home District Saving Bank and frame buildings to the east on King Street. At this point, a south-easterly wind had come up. The fire was blown across Nelson Street to Rolf's Tavern and consumed all of the buildings of the Market Block south of Duke Street (Adelaide Street) in the block bounded by King Street East, Nelson, Duke and the north-south back lane east of Church streets. At 3 a.m., the spire of the first St. James Cathedral at Church Street caught fire and the cathedral was soon destroyed. The fire spread to the south side of King Street and the 'old' (1831) Toronto City Hall and market building. It damaged most buildings on the east side of Nelson. At its height, the fire was visible from across Lake Ontario in St. Catharines.

The fire could have spread further, but Toronto west of Church Street was saved by a rain shower at about 3:30 a.m. This wet down the roofs of buildings to the west, making it harder for flying brands to ignite them. The wind was from the north-east, pushing the fire away from the court house, fire hall and St. Andrew's Church west of Church Street. At 4 a.m., troops arrived to assist the firefighters, and it was this assistance that likely saved the buildings on the south side of King Street from major damage. According to The Globe, the fire was mostly extinguished by 5 a.m.

The damage was estimated at CA$500,000 (equivalent to $15,435,813 in 2025) to CA$700,000 (equivalent to $21,610,138 in 2025), including $58,000 to St. James Church alone. The loss to insurance companies was $239,724. One life was lost, Richard Watson, publisher of the Canadian and Upper Canada Gazette journals, was in the office of The Patriot newspaper on Nelson, attempting to save printer types, when the floor collapsed, and he was trapped in the fire. Watson's body was not found until later that day in the ruins of The Patriot's offices. The Upper Canada Gazette, the first newspaper in Ontario, did not resume publication.

While the buildings on the main streets were brick, the inner buildings along laneways were made of wood and likely fuelled the fire. The early firefighting companies of the time, mostly made up of volunteers, had limited firefighting capability, and Toronto Fire Department was not formed until 1875. Fire hydrants and water tanks or barrels had been added in 1842 by the Metropolitan Water Company, but they were not enough.

== Aftermath ==
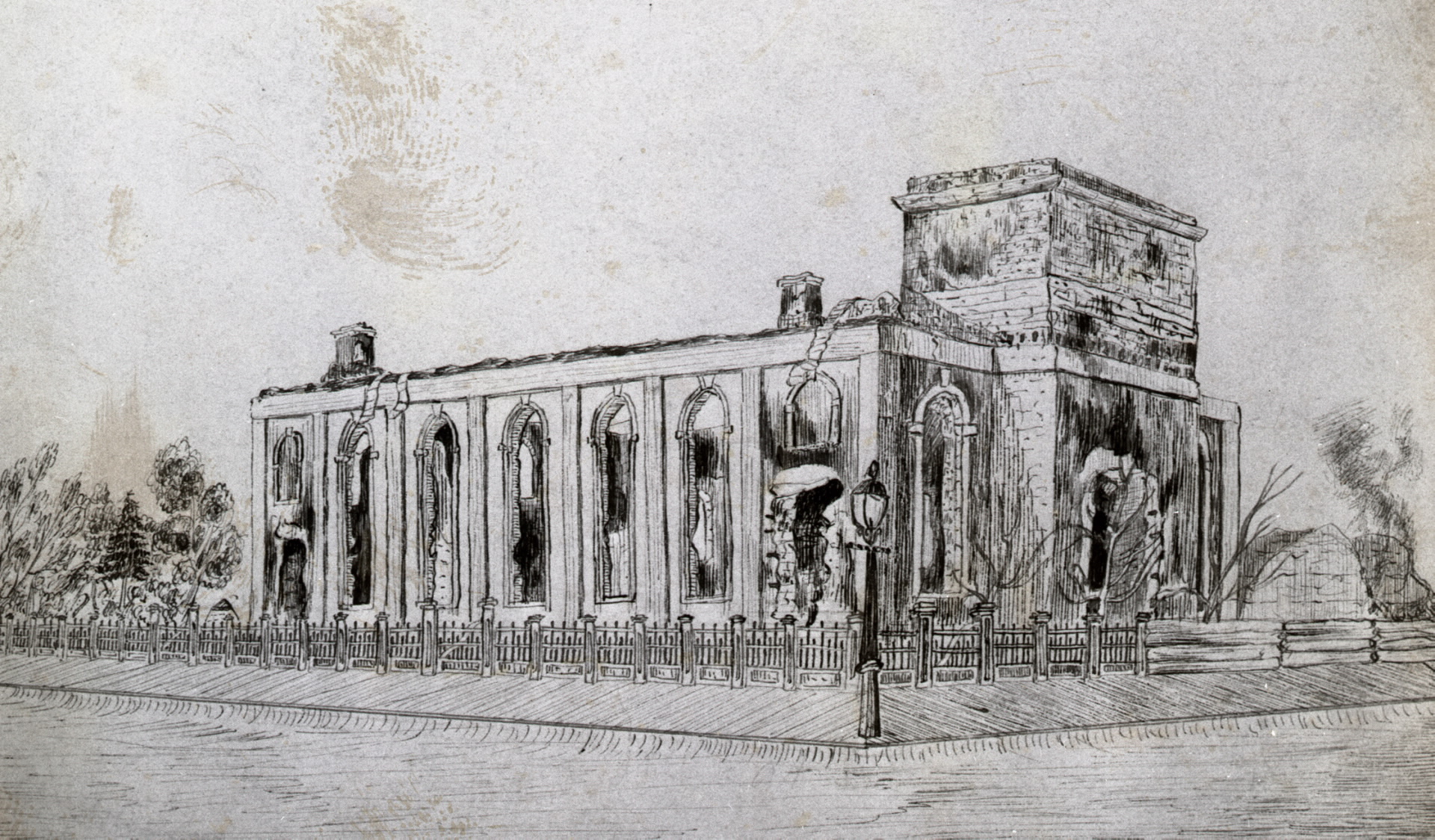
Cathedral Church of St. James after 1849 fire

None of the buildings within the Market Block (10–15 acres of property) survived, but buildings surrounding the block, such as the Daniel Brooke Building at King and Nelson, were spared. The Toronto City Hall had already been located one block south to Front Street in 1845. Most businesses were rebuilt by the fall of 1849.

Most of the buildings that burned down were made of wood, so in response, the city changed building codes to prevent future losses of this magnitude. St Lawrence Market (1851) was rebuilt and new buildings like St. Lawrence Hall (1851) and the Cathedral Church of St. James (1853) were built to code. This did not mean an end to future fires, as the year 1904 proved in the city's new core. Today, most of the block north of King Street is St. James Park.

== See also ==
- Great Fire of Toronto (1904)
