= St. Lawrence Market =

Public market in Toronto, Ontario, Canada

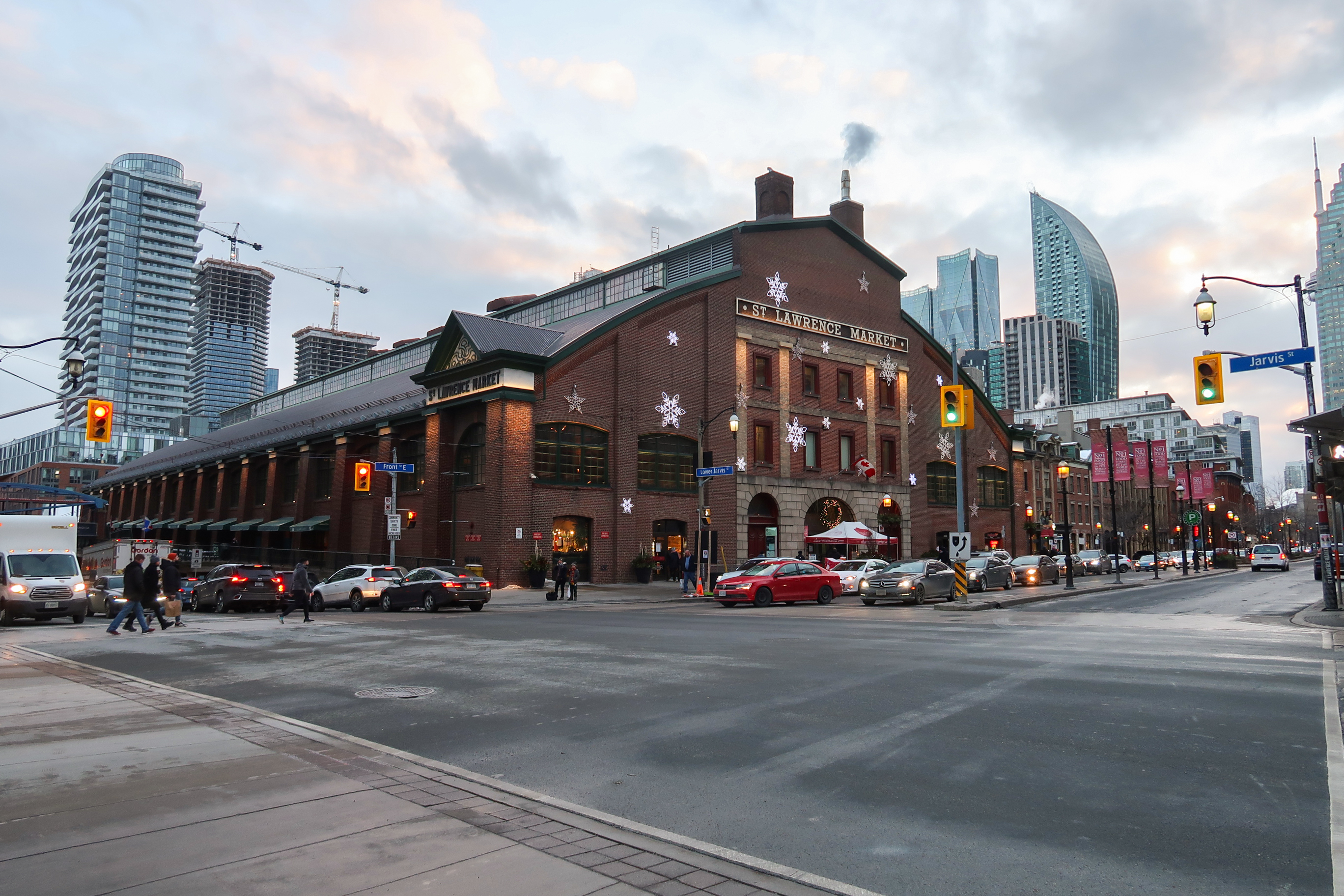
Exterior of St. Lawrence Market South

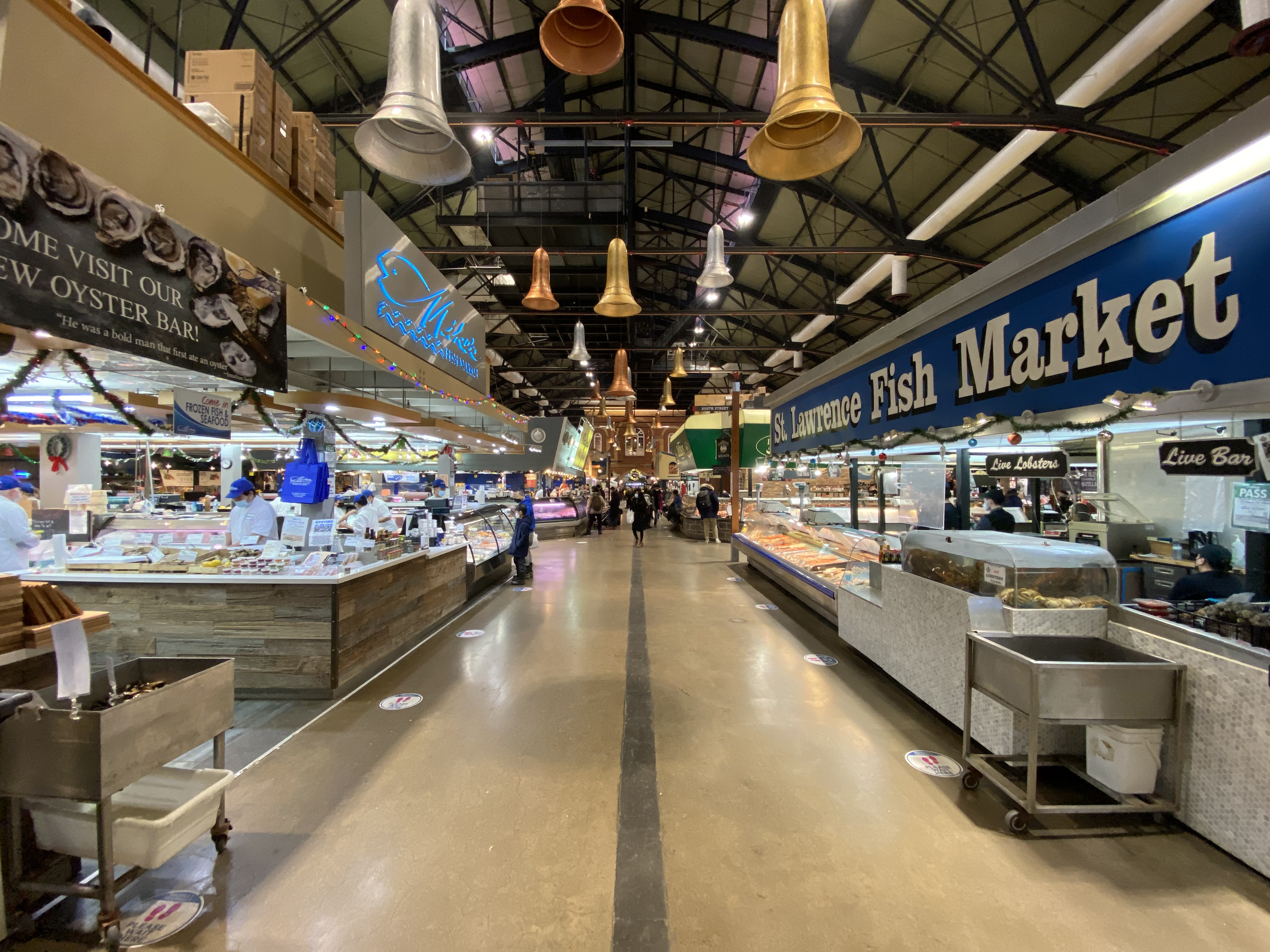
Interior of St. Lawrence Market South

St. Lawrence Market is a major public market in Toronto, Ontario, Canada. It is located along Front Street East and Jarvis Street in the St. Lawrence neighbourhood of downtown Toronto. The public market is made up of two sites adjacent to one another west of Jarvis Street, St. Lawrence Market North, and St. Lawrence Market South. St. Lawrence Market South is situated south of Front Street East, and is bounded by The Esplanade to the south. St. Lawrence Market North is situated north of Front Street East, and is bounded by St. Lawrence Hall to the north.

St. Lawrence Market was first established in the early 19th century, originating from a proclamation that established a designated area near King Street and New Street (later renamed Jarvis Street) for a public market in 1803. The first buildings erected for the market emerged in 1814, with the first permanent structures built in 1820. The first permanent market building was later replaced in 1831 with the first St. Lawrence Market North building. The market also served as one of four post offices in York prior to 1834. The market venue was damaged after the Great Fire of Toronto of 1849, and was architecturally replaced in 1851. The market was expanded in the early 1900s, with portions of a former Toronto city hall being integrated into the ground broken facility, opened as St. Lawrence Market South in 1902, and a counterpart north wing was constructed in 1904, later architecturally replaced in 1968, and again in 2016.

The market square space was used as the city hall of Toronto for most of the 19th century, occupying a temporary space at the original market space from 1834 to 1845. Prior to being renovated for market use, the building on St. Lawrence Market South was used as the municipal city hall from 1845 to 1899, before moving into the newly built city hall building in 1899.

== Buildings ==
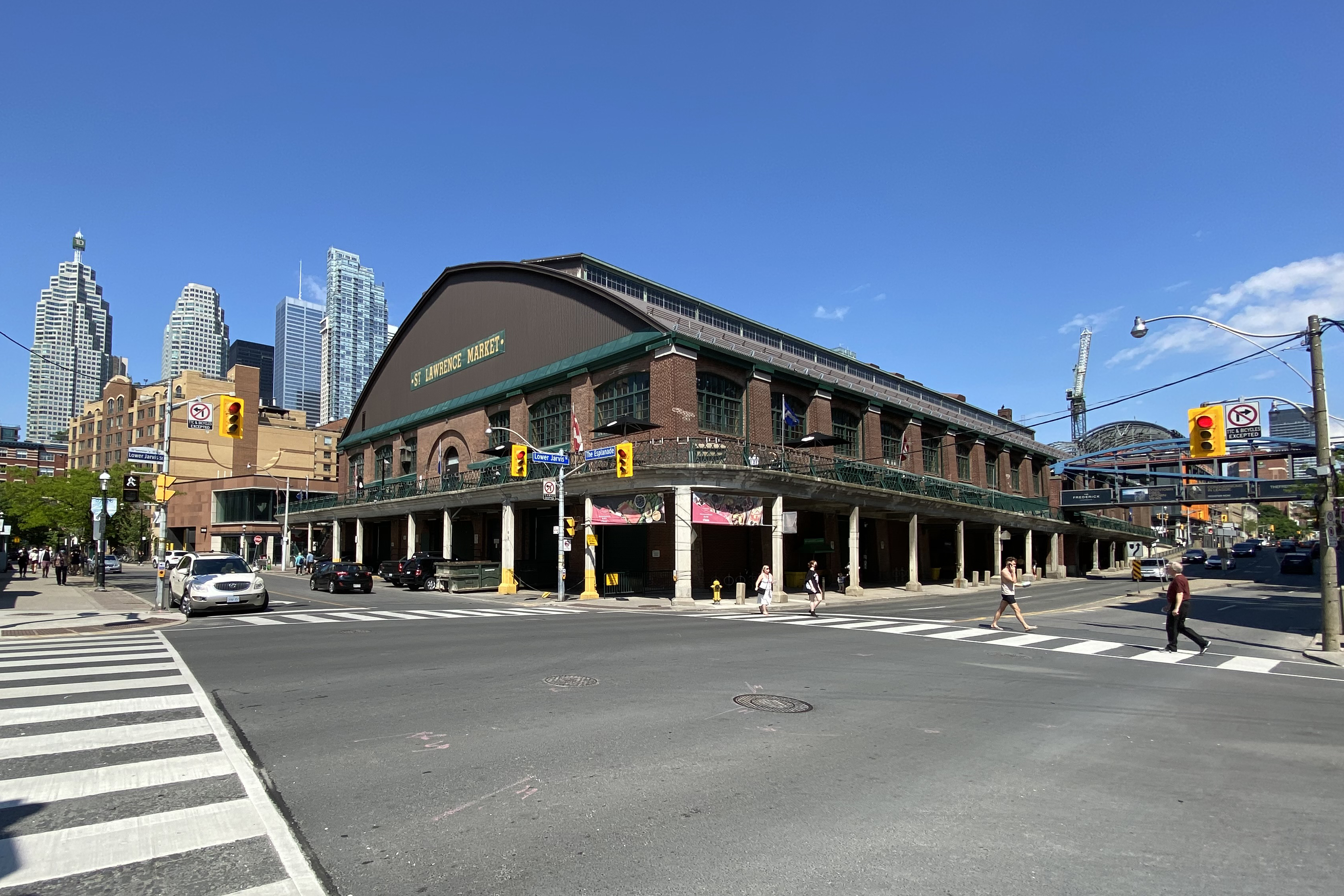
Building situated on St. Lawrence Market South

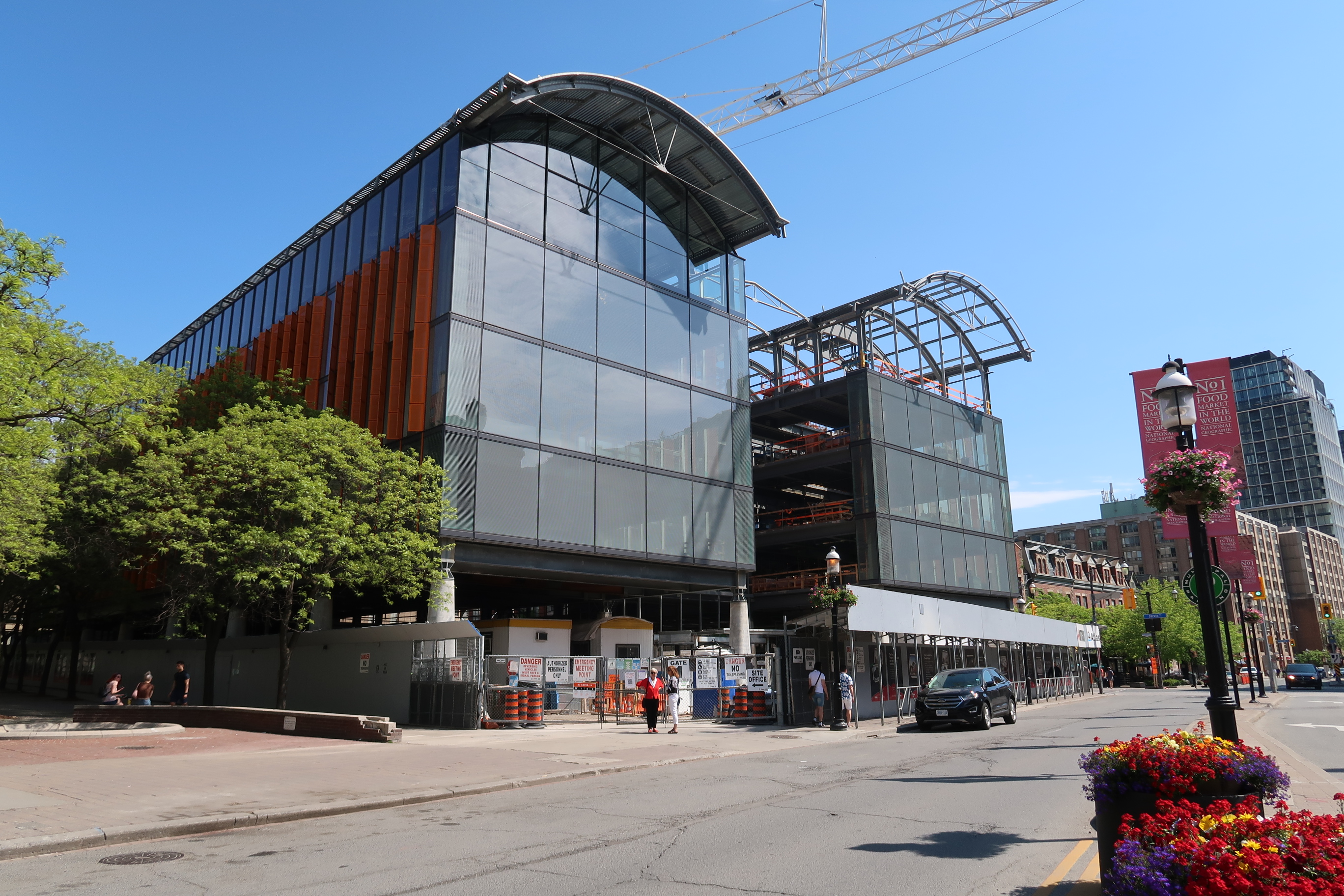
Construction for St. Lawrence Market North

View from The Esplanade and Market Street

There are two buildings in the complex, with different purposes. The original St. Lawrence Market North, on the north side of Front Street, hosted weekly farmer's markets and antique markets from 1968 until it was demolished in 2015 and replaced by a new building that opened in 2025. In the decade before it was opened, its market functions moved to a temporary building located south of The Esplanade between Lower Jarvis St. and Market St.

St. Lawrence Market South, on the south side of Front St, is open Tuesday to Sunday, featuring food stalls, restaurants and the St. Lawrence Market Gallery. The Market Gallery occupies the former Toronto City Council chamber within the South Market building.The South building dates from 1845, has been rebuilt twice, and still incorporates a section of its original building that was used as Toronto City Hall from 1845.

== History ==
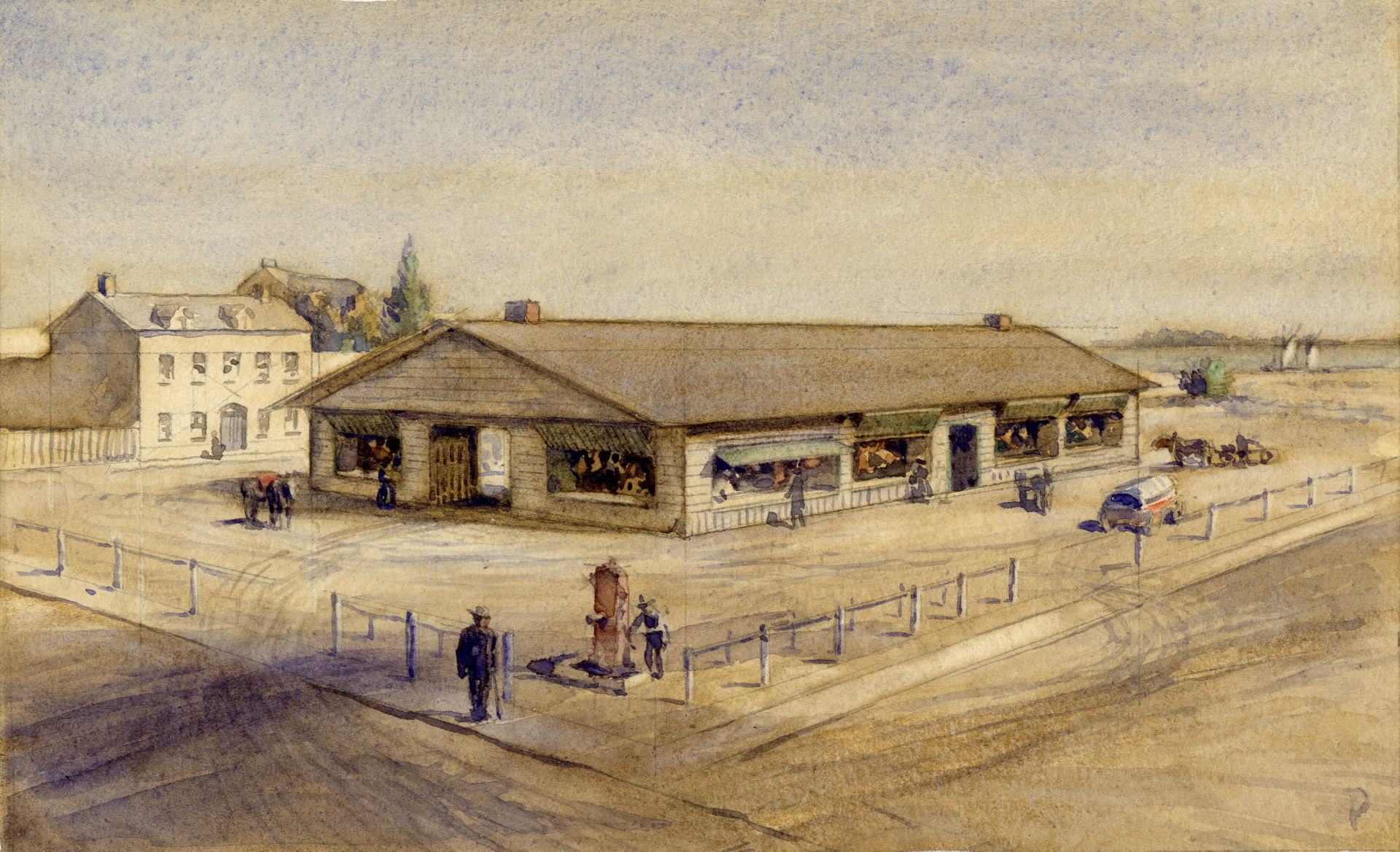
The original market, known as Market Square, was located at the corner of King Street and New Street.

By 1803, the population of York, Upper Canada had increased to the point where a public market was needed. Upper Canada Lieutenant Governor Peter Hunter established a weekly market day and designated an area. His proclamation appeared in the November 3, 1803 issue of The Upper Canada Gazette saying, "Whereas great prejudice hath arisen to the inhabitants of the town and township of York, and of other adjoining townships from no place or day having been set apart for exposing publicly for sale, cattle, sheep, poultry and other provisions, goods and merchandise brought by merchants, farmers and others for the necessary supply of the town of York, and whereas great benefit and advantage might be derived to the inhabitants and others by establishing a weekly market at a place and on a day certain for the purpose aforesaid."

The original market was known as Market Square and people gathered there on Saturdays at the corner of King Street and New Street, (today's Jarvis St) stretching west to Church Street and south to Palace (today's Front St), with a creek running through the center from King south to the bay. The plot set aside for the market was 5.5 acres (2.2 ha). The market square was the centre of the city's social life where auctions took place and public punishments were carried out. In the earliest days of the town, when slavery was still legal, this included auctions of black slaves. Town bylaws prohibited the selling of butter, eggs, fish, meat, poultry, and vegetables between the hours of 6am and 4pm on Saturdays, except at the market.

In the nineteenth century, Toronto had three public markets named after the wards within which they were located. St. Lawrence Market, founded in 1803, was the first, St. Patrick's Market at 238 Queen Street West was the second, created in 1836, and still exists in the form of an organic food court within its current building, constructed in 1912, and St. Andrew's Market on the block between Richmond, Adelaide, Brant and Maud streets was built in 1850 and is now a park.

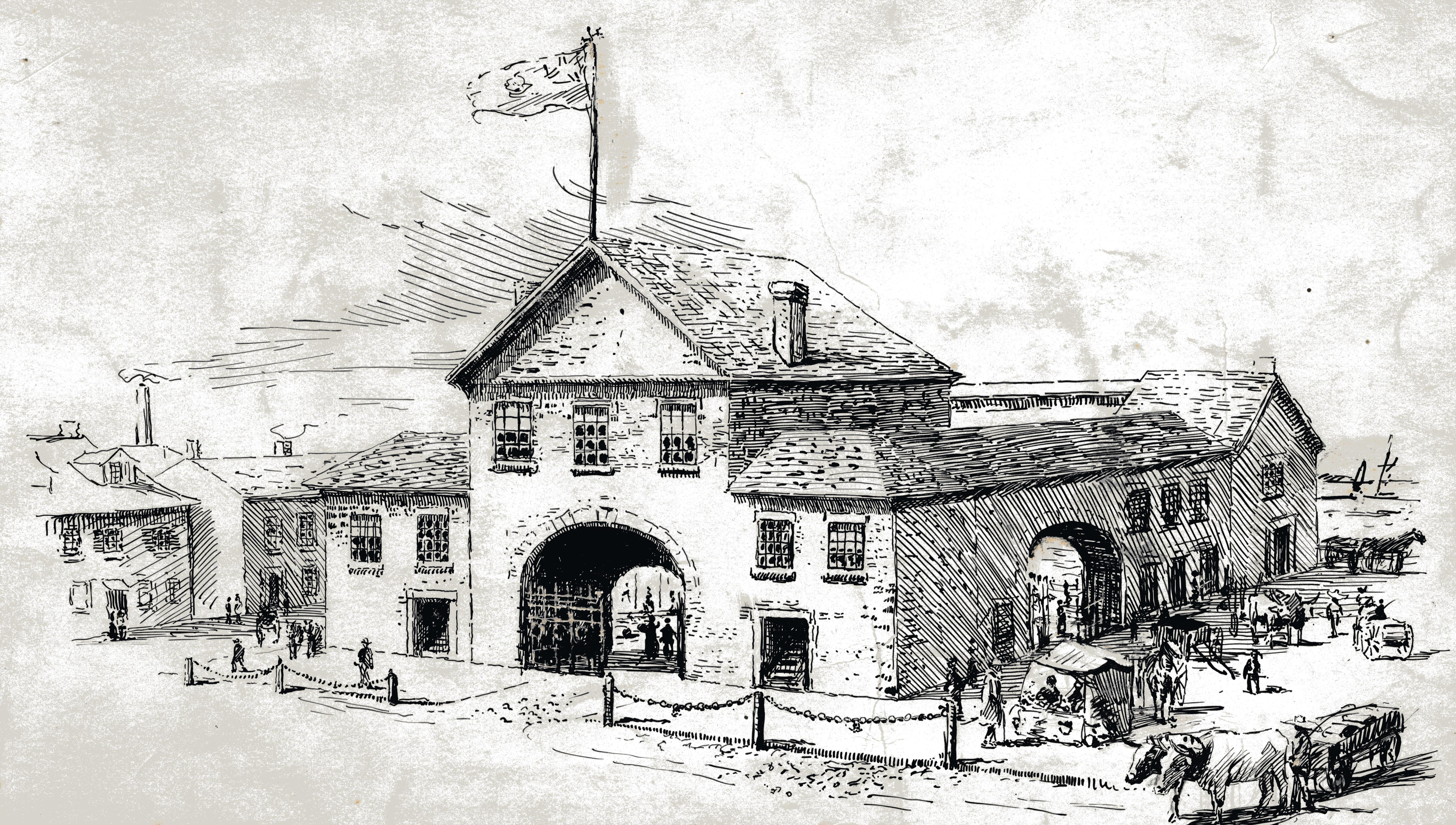
The second permanent market building was erected in 1831

The first St. Lawrence market building, a temporary shelter, 24 feet (7.3 m) by 36 feet (11 m) was built in 1814. The first permanent structure was built in 1820. In 1823, the town's first public well was dug on the property. In 1831, the wooden market building was torn down and a quadrangular brick building with arched entrances at the sides was built. The building's office space served as a temporary home to City Council until 1845. This building was used until the 1849 Toronto Great Fire destroyed the northern side of the building and it was torn down.

After the fire, St. Lawrence Hall was built, along with a new market building between it and Front, the first to be known as St Lawrence Market. It was an arcade in a north–south orientation. To finance the new construction, the City of Toronto sold lots on the market block. In the 1850s, the railways arrived in Toronto, and rail lines were extended along Front Street to the market. These lines were relocated to the new Esplanade south of Front Street and a passenger station was erected.

The present St. Lawrence Market South building was built in 1845 as Toronto City Hall and was rebuilt in 1850. In 1899, Toronto City Hall moved to a new building at Queen and Bay Street. Part of the old City Hall was incorporated into a new building in 1904. At the same time, the 1851 north market building was torn down and replaced with a new building similar to the new south building. A canopy was built between the north and south buildings and this was torn down in the 1950s. The north market building was replaced with a simple single floor building in 1968, and the south building was renovated in 1972.

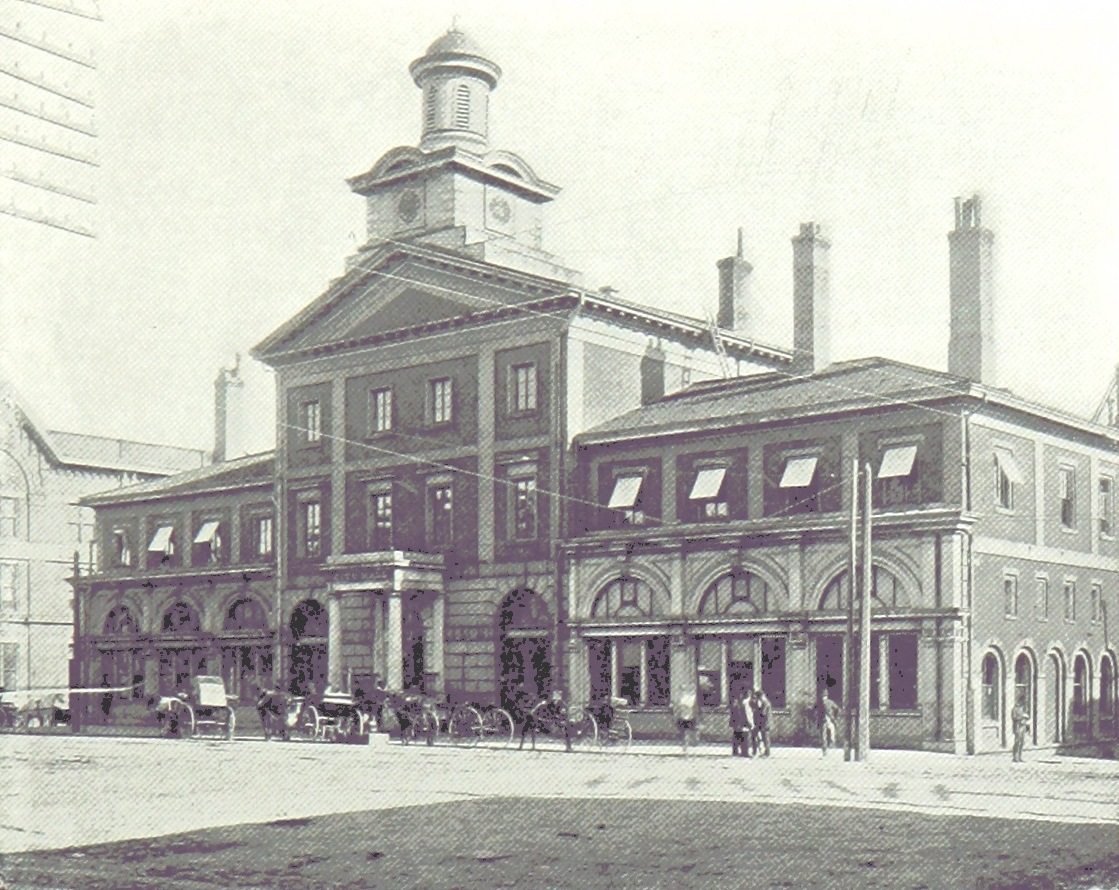
View of Toronto City Hall building in 1899. Built in 1845, the building's central section was incorporated into the current South building.

The north building was demolished in 2015. The City of Toronto government built a new building on the site of the North building at 92 Front St. It is a four-storey building with an atrium. It was constructed by Buttcon Limited/The Atlas corporation in a joint venture. Construction of the new project started in July 2019. Spring 2022 was the timeline that had been announced for the new building to be ready. During the rebuilding of the North Market, the farmer's market was relocated to 125 The Esplanade, just south of the South building. Foundations of the 1831, 1851 and 1904 North Market buildings were found below the floor of the 1968 building. The new North Market building houses underground parking, a court house, the traditional Saturday Farmers' Market and other events such as the regular Sunday 'antique' market. The courthouse opened in March 2025 and the Farmer's Market in April.

St. Lawrence Market was named the world's best food market by National Geographic in April 2012.

The St. Lawrence Market was historically open from Tuesdays to Saturdays. The market was planning on opening Sundays as well, beginning on March 15, 2020. However, this was delayed due to the COVID-19 pandemic and Sunday opening did not start until summer 2022.

== See also ==
- Old Town, Toronto
- St. Andrew's Market and Playground
- St. Patrick's Market
