= St. Lawrence Hall =

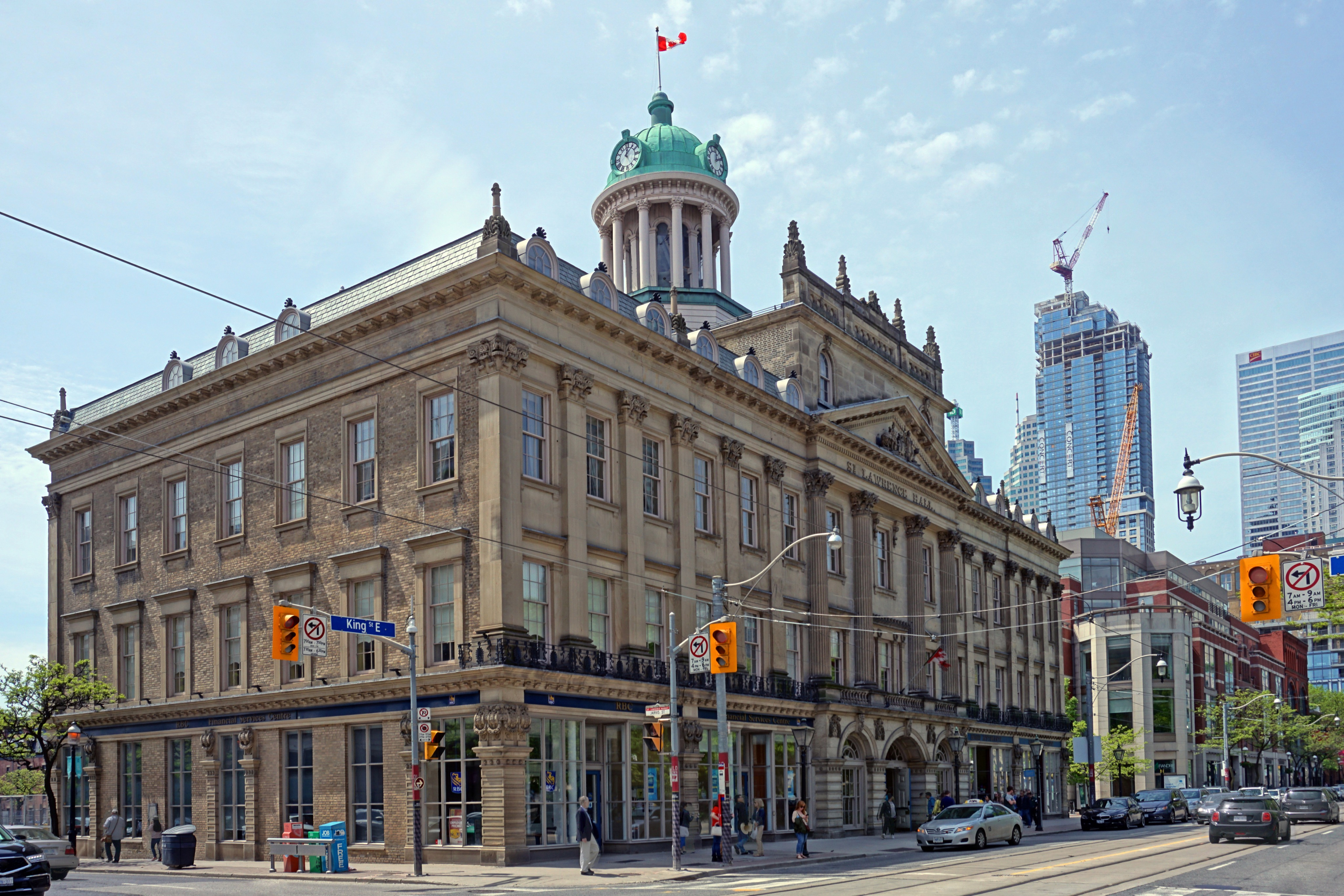
- St. Lawrence Hall on King Street
- Interactive map of St. Lawrence Hall
- 43°39′01″N 79°22′20″W
- Location: Toronto, Ontario, Canada

History
- Built: 1850–1851

Site notes
- Architect: William Thomas
- Architectural style: Renaissance Revival
- Restored: 1967
- Current use: meeting hall
- Owner: City of Toronto

National Historic Site of Canada
- Designated: 1967

Ontario Heritage Act
- Designated: 2009

St. Lawrence Hall is a meeting hall in Toronto, Ontario, Canada, located at the corner of King Street East and Jarvis Street. It was created to be Toronto's public meeting hall home to public gatherings, concerts, and exhibitions. Its main feature was a thousand-seat ballroom. For decades, the hall was the centre of Toronto's social life before larger venues took over much of this business. Today the hall continues as a venue for events including weddings, conferences, and art shows.

== History ==
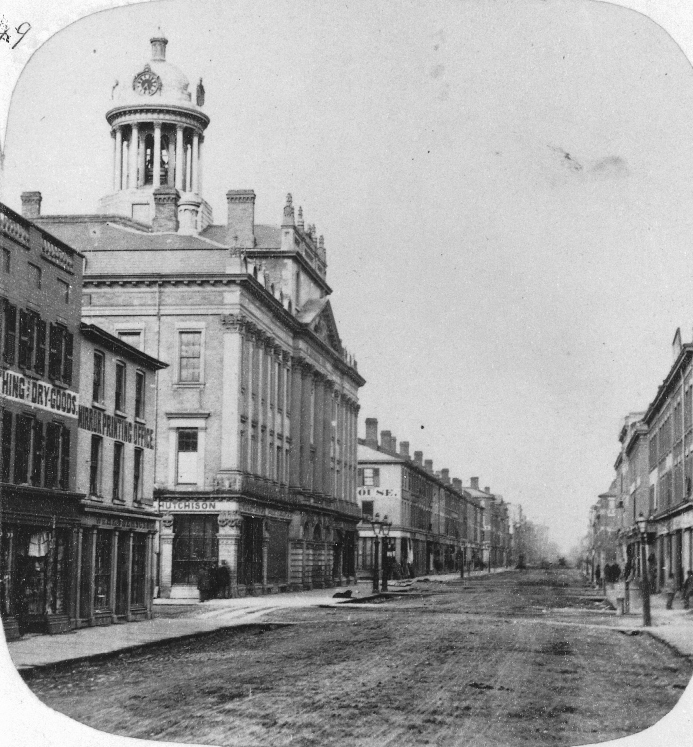
St. Lawrence Hall, c. 1860. The building was erected in 1850—51, following the Great Fire of Toronto in 1849.

The location was previously part of the Market Square area and had been the site of the first permanent market buildings as well as site of Joseph Bloor's Farmer's Arms Inn from 1824 to 1831. The Great Fire of Toronto in 1849 caused the northern portions of this building to be pulled down, leading to the building of the current St. Lawrence Market in 1850 a block south at what was then Palace Street, and today is known as Front Street. The vacated area at the corner of King and Jarvis was in the heart of the growing community. The new Renaissance Revival style building was designed by William Thomas who won the commission in an open competition.

It was here that prominent politicians such as John A. Macdonald and George Brown, Fathers of Confederation, addressed the people of Toronto. It was the main venue for musicians and other performers who came to the city. The lower levels were integrated into the market and were home to stores and businesses. A third storey section of the building was known as St. Patrick Hall, an important meeting place for the Irish Catholic Benevolent Union.

By the 1870s, the growing city had a number of larger and more suitable performance venues and the Hall entered a long decline. It continued to serve a number of roles, including several years as the home of the National Ballet. As a Centennial project, the City of Toronto government fully restored the hall in 1967 to mark the Centennial of Confederation. During restoration, the east wing collapsed in March 1967 and was rebuilt. That same year it was designated as a National Historic Site. The first two Juno Awards ceremonies were presented here in 1970 and 1971.

A remote detonated explosion, standing in for the groundbreaking of Canada's Wonderland theme park in the York Region town of Maple, took place from the Hall.

The site is protected under Part IV of the Ontario Heritage Act since 2009. The City of Toronto also notes that the "Front Street right of way at 92 Front Street East is an Archaeologically Sensitive Area".

== Architect and architecture ==
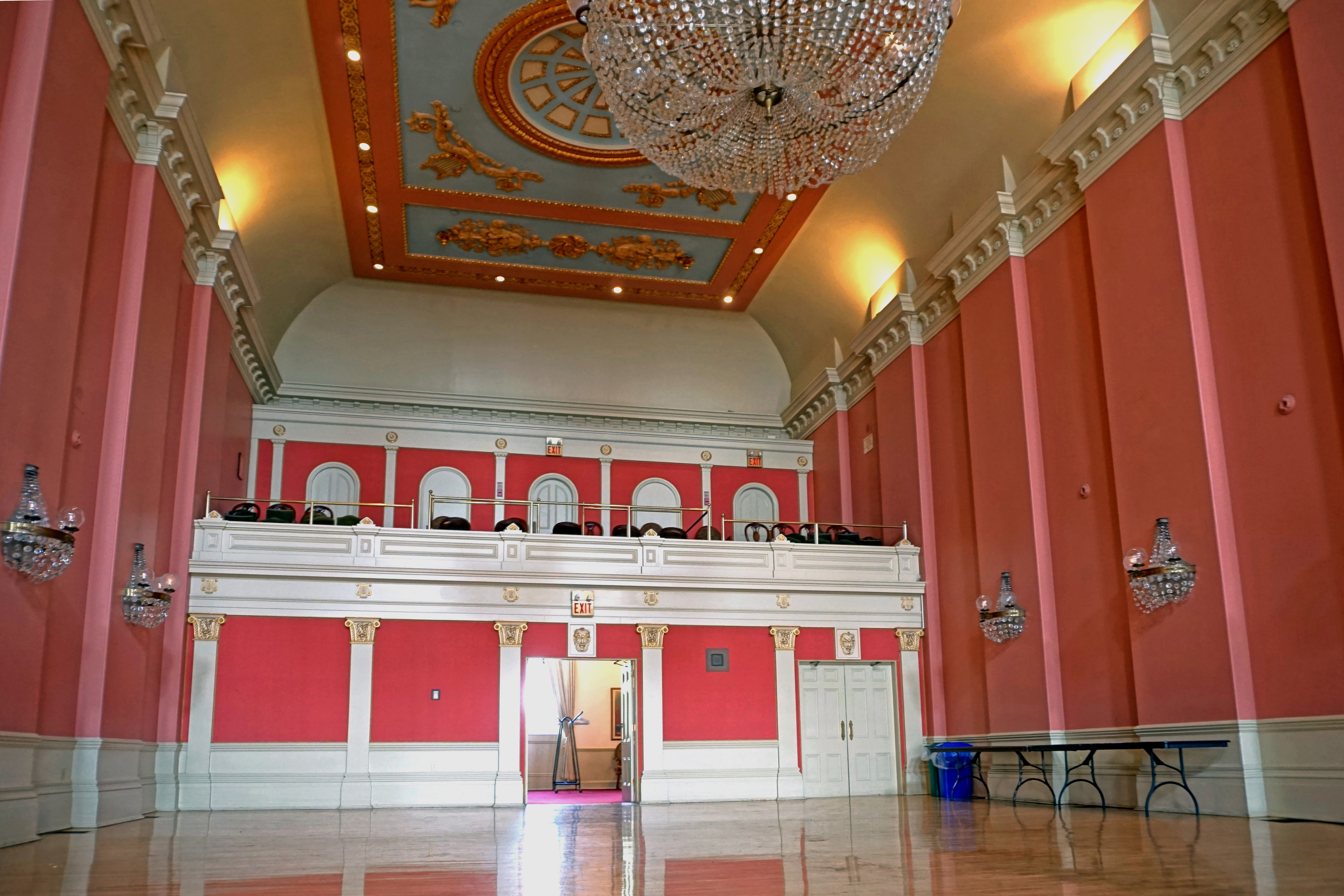
Interior of St. Lawrence Hall. The building was designed by architect William Thomas.

William Thomas (c. 1799–26 December 1860) was an architect of both England and Canada. He immigrated to Toronto with his wife and ten children from Leamington Spa, England due to the economic crisis in 1837. After his emigration to Toronto, his career as a city engineer and architect prospered. One of his well-recognized successful works in architecture after his settlement is St. Lawrence Hall.

Thomas' work was undoubtedly influenced by 16th-century Italian Renaissance architecture, the central Roman temple that consists of the pediment, four engaged Corinthian columns, and the three arches underneath very closely resemble the work of an Italian Classist architect, Andrea Palladio. The symmetrical composition of building elements is also a defining characteristic of Renaissance architecture. The Renaissance Revival was a clear goal of William Thomas, but the Hall reinterpreted the Italination in a vernacular and contemporary manner. St. Lawrence Hall is designed in a Victorian composition with a French mansard roof due to abundant snowfall in Ontario. The ornamental cupola on top of the main hall is another feature of the Hall.

As part of the commission, a market building was built to the south of the main Hall building. It was a single-storey building on the remainder of the block south to Front Street. It has been replaced three times and is currently the site of the St. Lawrence Market North court, office and market building.

The 1967 restoration was directed by Toronto architect and professor Eric Arthur.

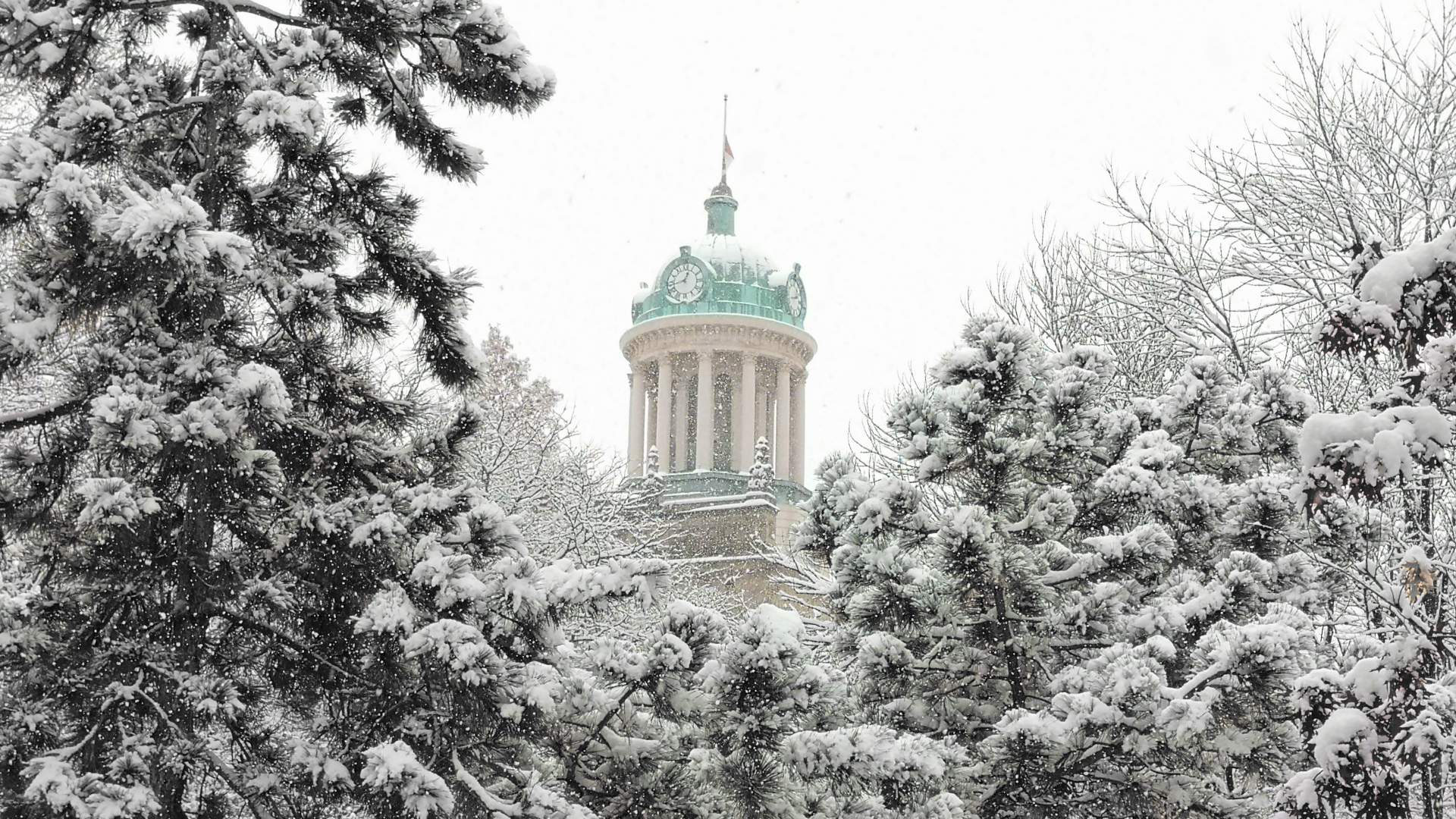
St. Lawrence Hall from St. James Park November, 2021

== See also ==
- List of oldest buildings and structures in Toronto
