= St. Andrew's Market and Playground =

Park in Toronto, Ontario, Canada

Coordinates: 43.64647°N 79.39883°W

St. Andrew's Playground
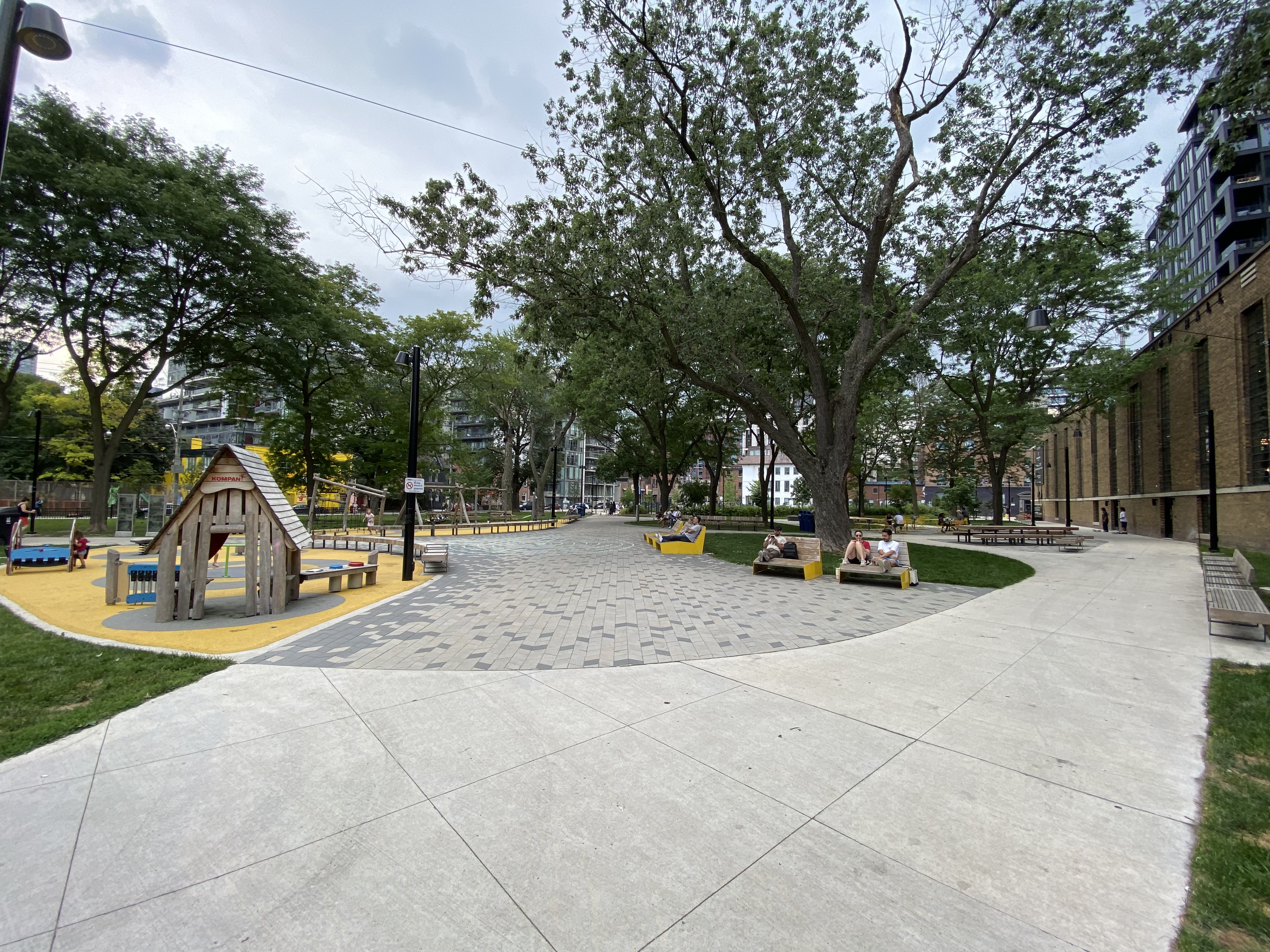
- St. Andrew's Playground Park in 2023
- Interactive map of St. Andrew's Playground
- Type: Public Park
- Location: Toronto, Ontario
- Created: 1850
- Operator: Toronto Parks, Forestry and Recreation Division

St. Andrew's Playground is a small park in downtown Toronto. It is located at the 450 Adelaide Street West, at the northwest corner of Brant St and Adelaide. It has a playground for children and an off-leash area for dogs that is surrounded by a short fence, with an accessible water fountain for pets, children, and adults. A Heritage Toronto plaque in the northwest corner describing the history and significance of the park was installed in 2007.

== History ==
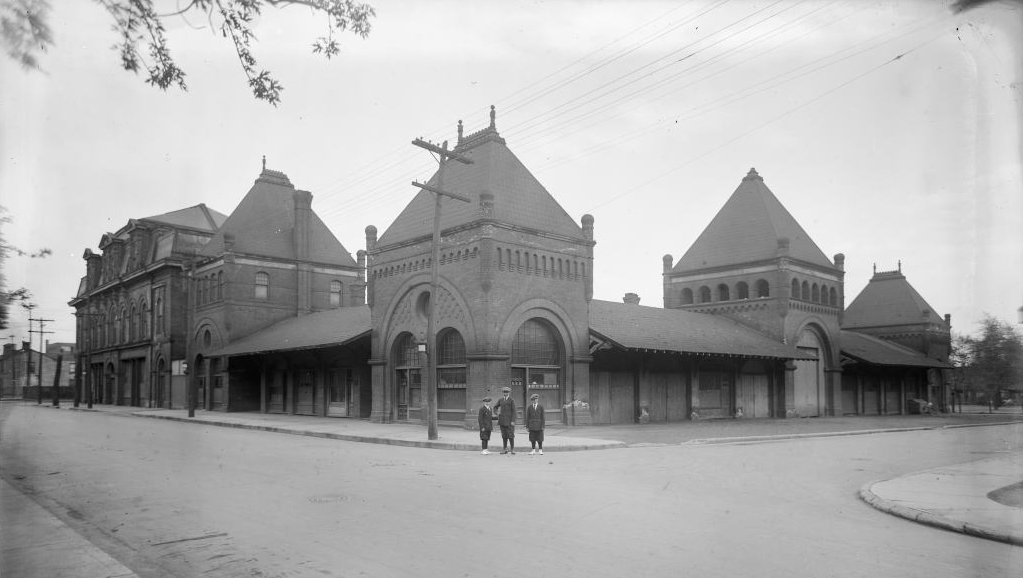
1921 view from north-west of St. Andrew's Market Hall and Market buildings.

In 1834 the land was planned as a square under the 'New Town Extension' and in 1837, this city block was set aside for a public market, the third of its kind after the St. Lawrence Market and the St. Patrick's Market. The market was built in 1850 and named "St. Andrew's Market" after its city ward. It served as an important commercial centre for what was then Toronto's west end.

A fire in 1860 destroyed the first market buildings. They were replaced in 1873 by the much larger St. Andrew's Hall and Market, designed in Renaissance Revival style. The building housed a police station, a community hall, a public library branch, as well as the market sellers of fresh produce and butchers.

In the 1870s, St. Andrew's Market began to lose some of its relevance as a commercial hub. In 1889, an addition was added, however, by 1900 the market stalls were mostly empty. The buildings were demolished in 1932, and replaced by a waterworks building (housing offices, warehouse, and workshops) designed by City Architect James John Woolnough.

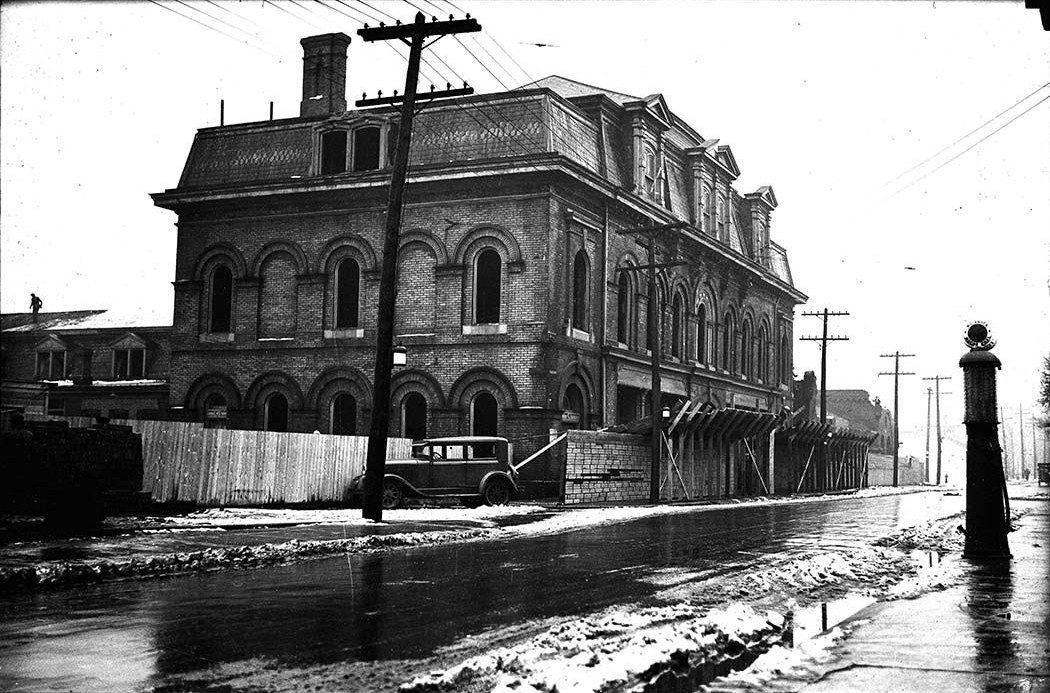
St. Andrew's Market prior to its demolition in 1932.

The southern section of the Market was used as a public park since the 1880s, becoming "St. Andrew's Playground" in 1909, "the first City of Toronto property dedicated to, and equipped for supervised children's play."

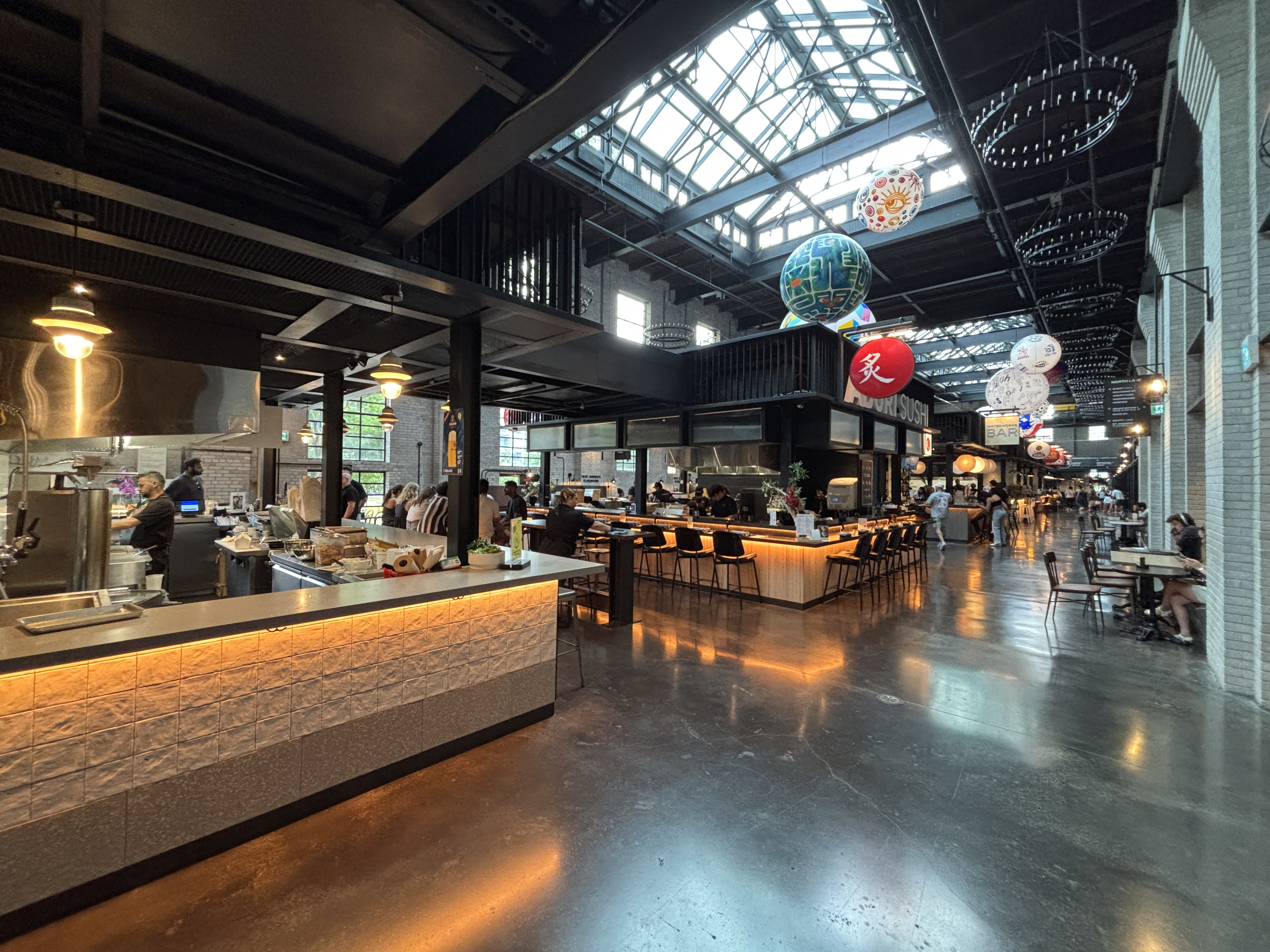
The Waterworks Food Hall opened in 2024

In 2009, the St. Andrews Market was partly revived through a weekly outdoor farmers' market operated by Farmers' Markets Ontario which occurred on Saturday mornings from early June to late October at Adelaide and Maud Streets, in a parking lot alongside the park. However, due to low attendance and resulting lack of vendor interest, the market did not return the following year.

The Waterworks building redeveloped into a mixed-use residential, commercial, and public building. Most of the existing building repurposed into a 55,000-square-foot food hall and other uses (YMCA), and 13 floors of apartments are to be built above. The Waterworks building is a registered heritage building. It is an example of an Art Deco inspired building. As part of the redevelopment, the building site has been sold to a private developer. The food hall opened in June 2024.

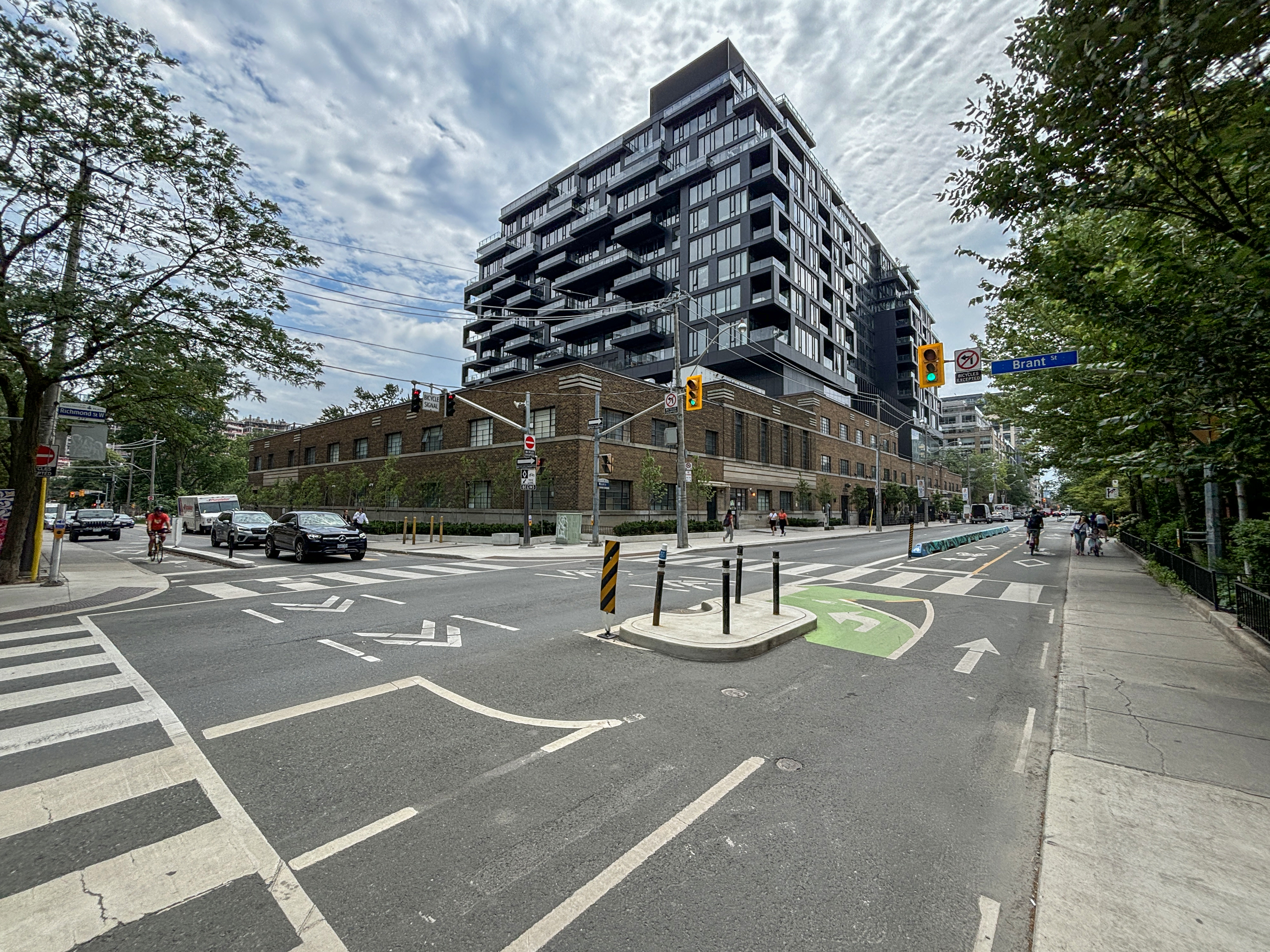
The Waterworks building redeveloped into a mixed-use residential

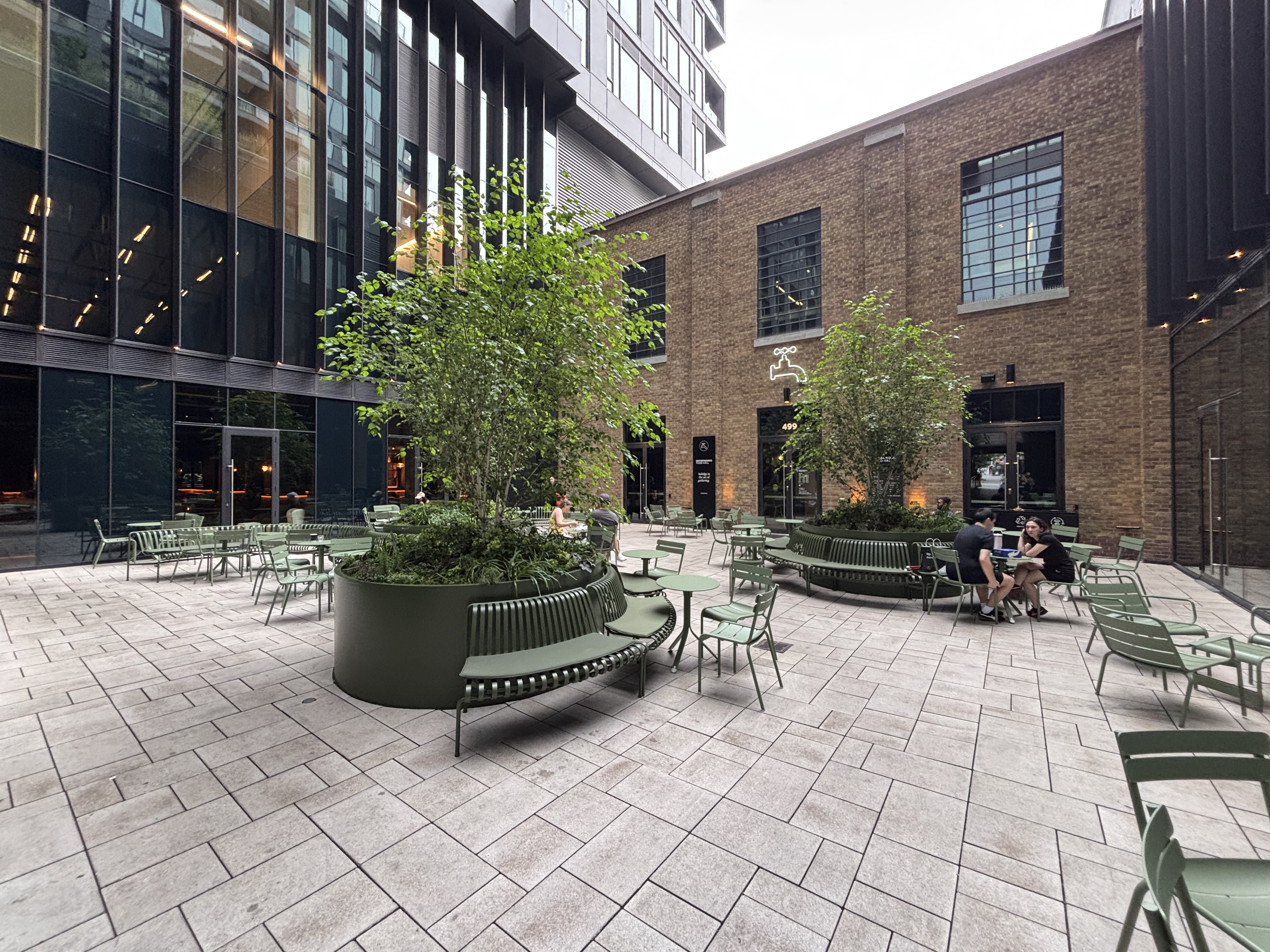
The Waterworks courtyard

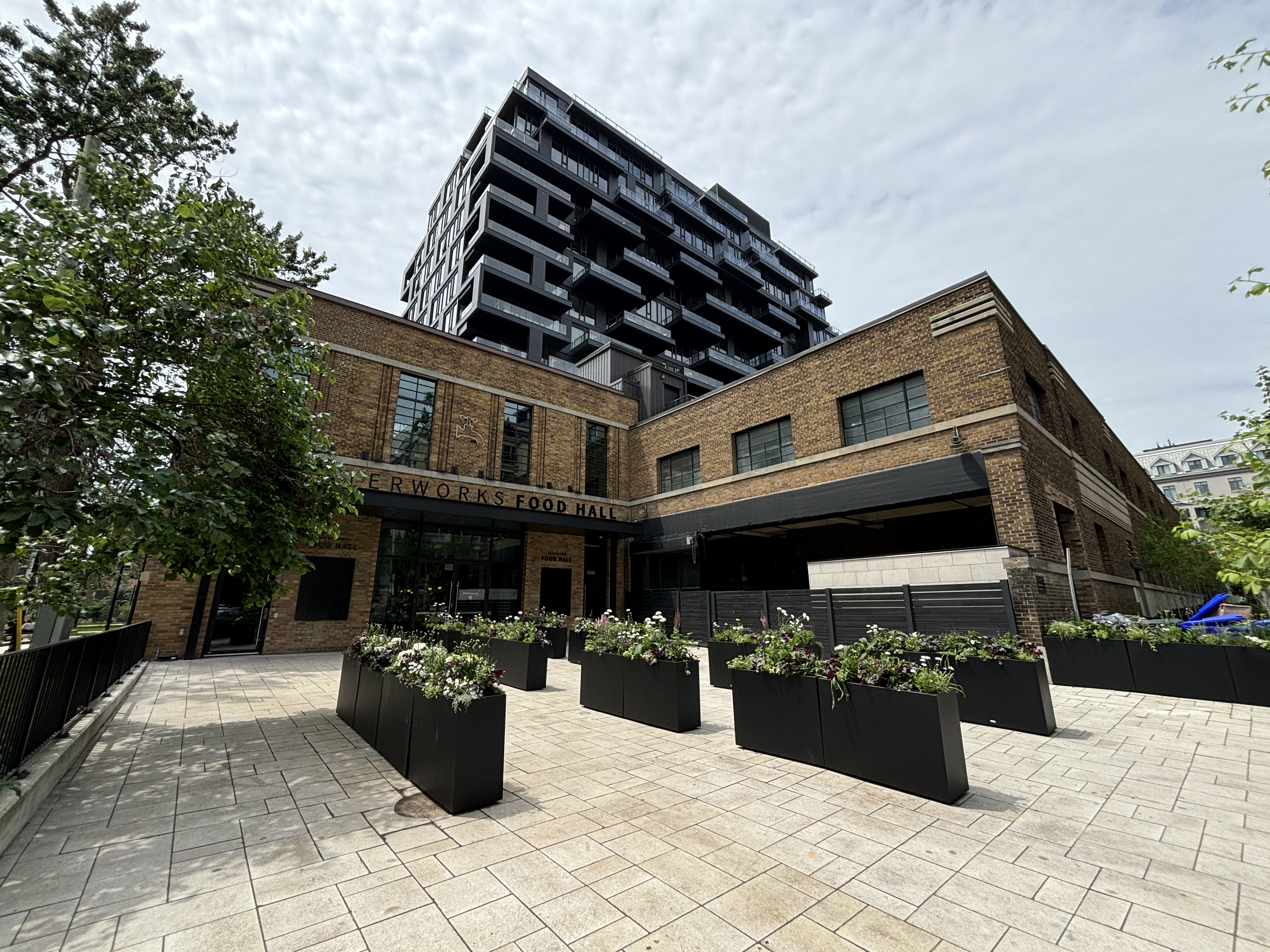
The Waterworks exterior

== See also ==
- St. Lawrence Market
- St. Patrick's Market
