= St. Patrick's Market =

Heritage public market in Toronto, Canada

Coordinates: 43°39′01″N 79°23′26″W

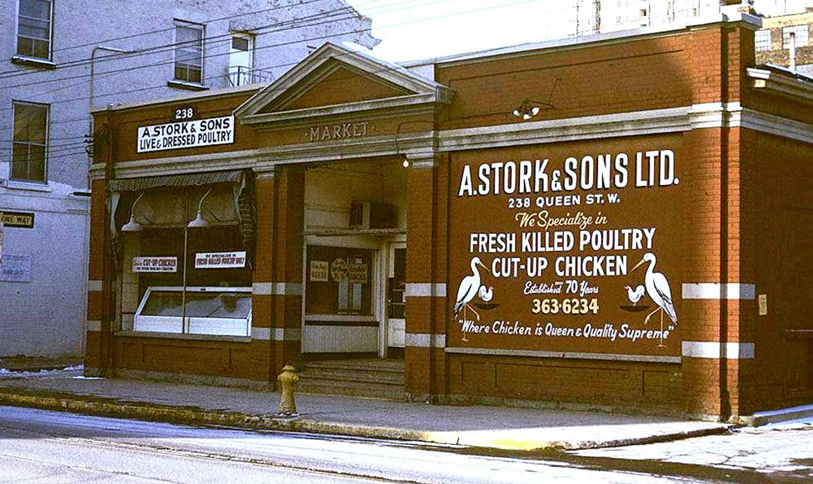
The second and current St. Patrick's Market building built in 1912. This picture was taken in 1971 when the building was occupied by A. Stork & Sons.

St. Patrick's Market is one of three public markets created in Toronto in the 19th century along with St. Lawrence Market and St. Andrew's Market. The current structure on the lot was built in 1912 and was designated a heritage site by the City of Toronto in 1975.

== From market to slaughterhouse ==
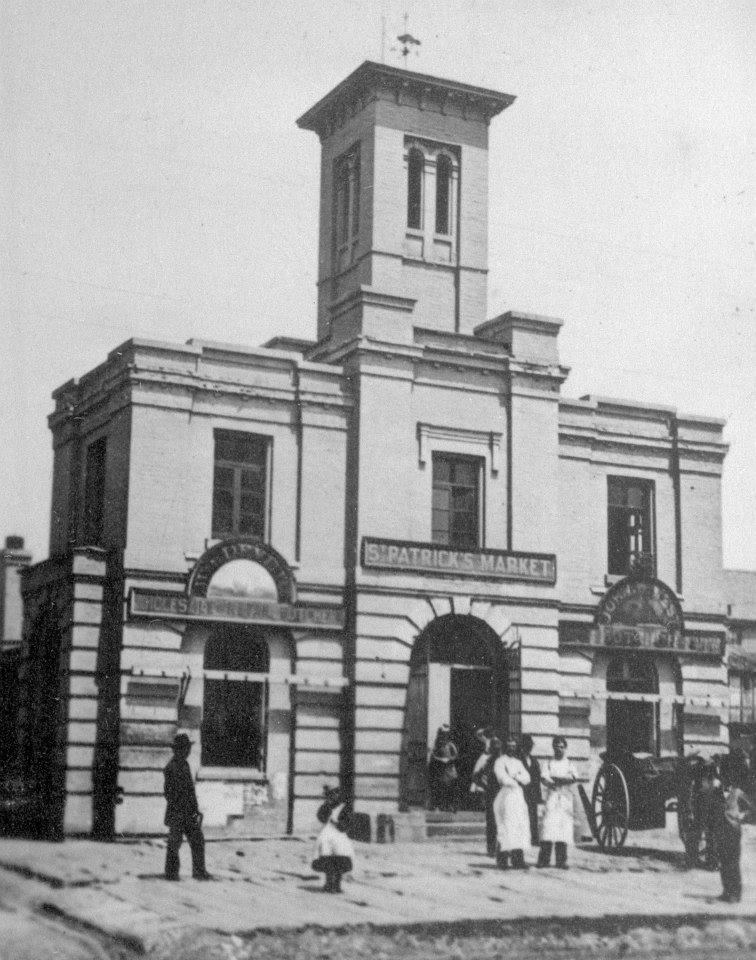
The original St. Patrick's Market building in 1885. This building was erected in 1854 and burned down in 1912.

The lot at what is now 238 Queen Street West (at John Street) was designated for a public market for St. Patrick's Ward in 1836 when D’Arcy Boulton bequeathed the property to the city with the express provision that it was to be used forever as a public market. The original market building, a two-story Italianate architecture structure with a tower, was built in 1854.

The current single story Neo-Georgian/Colonial Revival structure was built in 1912, after the previous structure was destroyed by fire. A. Stork & Sons, founded by Abraham Stork in 1897, originally operated a small stall in the market but grew to become one of the biggest poultry processors in Toronto, leasing and occupying the entire building by the 1930s, advertising itself as a live poultry slaughterhouse with a large sign painted on the building's frontage promising "fresh killed poultry and cut up chickens" for sale on the premises.

In 1909, 1911, and again in 1939, the city petitioned the province's estate commissioners to free it from the obligation to operate the property perpetually as a market, but had its attempt to obtain unrestricted ownership of the property rejected.

== Leasing agreement with Market Inc. ==
Stork & Sons closed after the mid -1980s and, in 1988, the city signed a 50-year lease with Market Inc. to host an "exciting retail mini food market" with "an ambiance similar to the St. Lawrence Market", including a bakery, and stands selling meat, seafood, fruit, vegetables and "food stands with prepared and unprepared meals within its market".

The leasing agreement proved controversial, as the company that won the contract and rebranded the building "the Queen Street Market" for several years, operated it more along the lines of a food court, with tenants that included various take out stands and, at one point, a Ben & Jerry's. Responding to pressure from the city, Market Inc's owner, George Friedman, renovated the building, restored the St. Patrick's name, at least in part, and promised to "reopen as a market offering of different types of foods - both raw and ready to eat."

By 2011, Friedman was promising to turn the market into a food court, to be called "The Grove", focusing on healthy organic food with a policy requiring vendors to refrain from using "artificial flavours, colouring and hormones," renting to a variety of vendors who would offer unprepared food as well as those offering take-out, and to run an open air farmer's market in the space behind the building.

However, by 2015, the venue, now called the Queen Street Live Fresh Food Market, was largely empty aside from a tea shop, the BakeryHaus bakery, the Jerk Joint which was a jerk chicken take out stand, and a dessert shop specializing in chocolate and baklava.

The market was forced to close temporarily in July 2017 by the department of public health after mice were found eating baklava in one of the stalls after dark.

In 2018, the now empty building again underwent renovations, this time to rebrand it as "Queen Street Eats". The leaseholder promised there would be seven vendor stalls, washrooms, upgraded kitchens, a graffiti wall, and a seating area for guests – which, the city had not previously permitted.

== Termination of lease and future of the market ==
In the fall of 2019, the city filed an application in superior court to terminate the lease alleging breaches of the agreement by the leaseholder, including failing to operate a food market and to provide audited financial statements. On December 12, 2019, the superior court ruled that the lease agreement had been violated, terminated the lease and returned control of the vacant market to the city, while also ordering the former leaseholder, Market Inc., to pay the city damages and unpaid rent. Mayor John Tory said after the ruling that "Now is the beginning of a new process because of the court decision that will allow to have all options on the table. I hope it will be something that will involve a clever use that attracts the community in that might involve artists and retailers, and others... The bottom line is we want to bring that space alive because it has been in a dormant state for far too long and I am just happy the legal system saw our way of looking at that and allows us now to get on with some very exciting plans for a very exciting part of that community."

== See also ==
- St. Lawrence Market
- St. Andrew's Market and Playground
