= Beverley Street =

Minor street located in central Toronto, Ontario

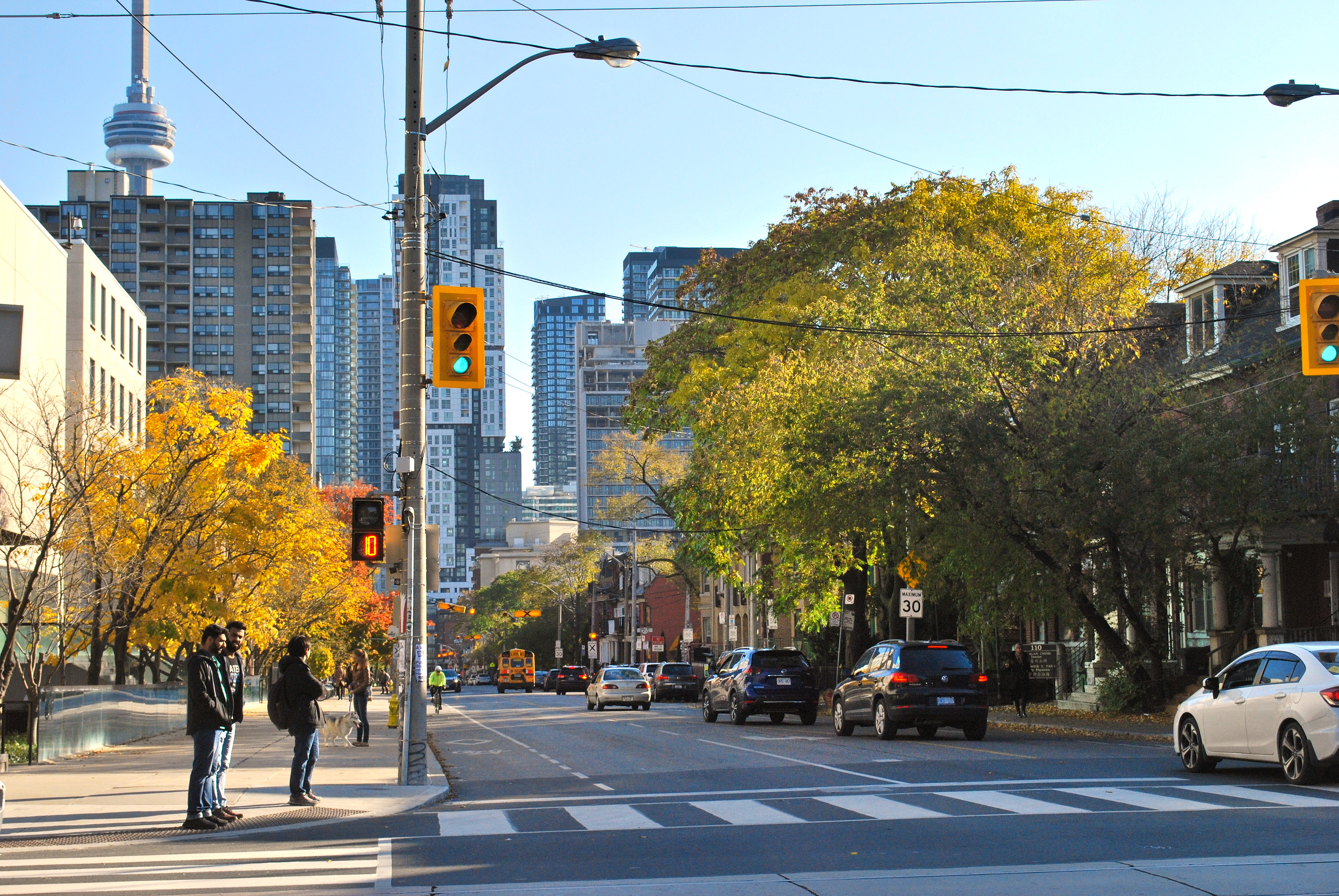
- Beverley Street at Dundas Street West in 2019
- Length: 1 km (0.62 mi)
- Location: Queen Street West – College Street (continues north as St. George Street)

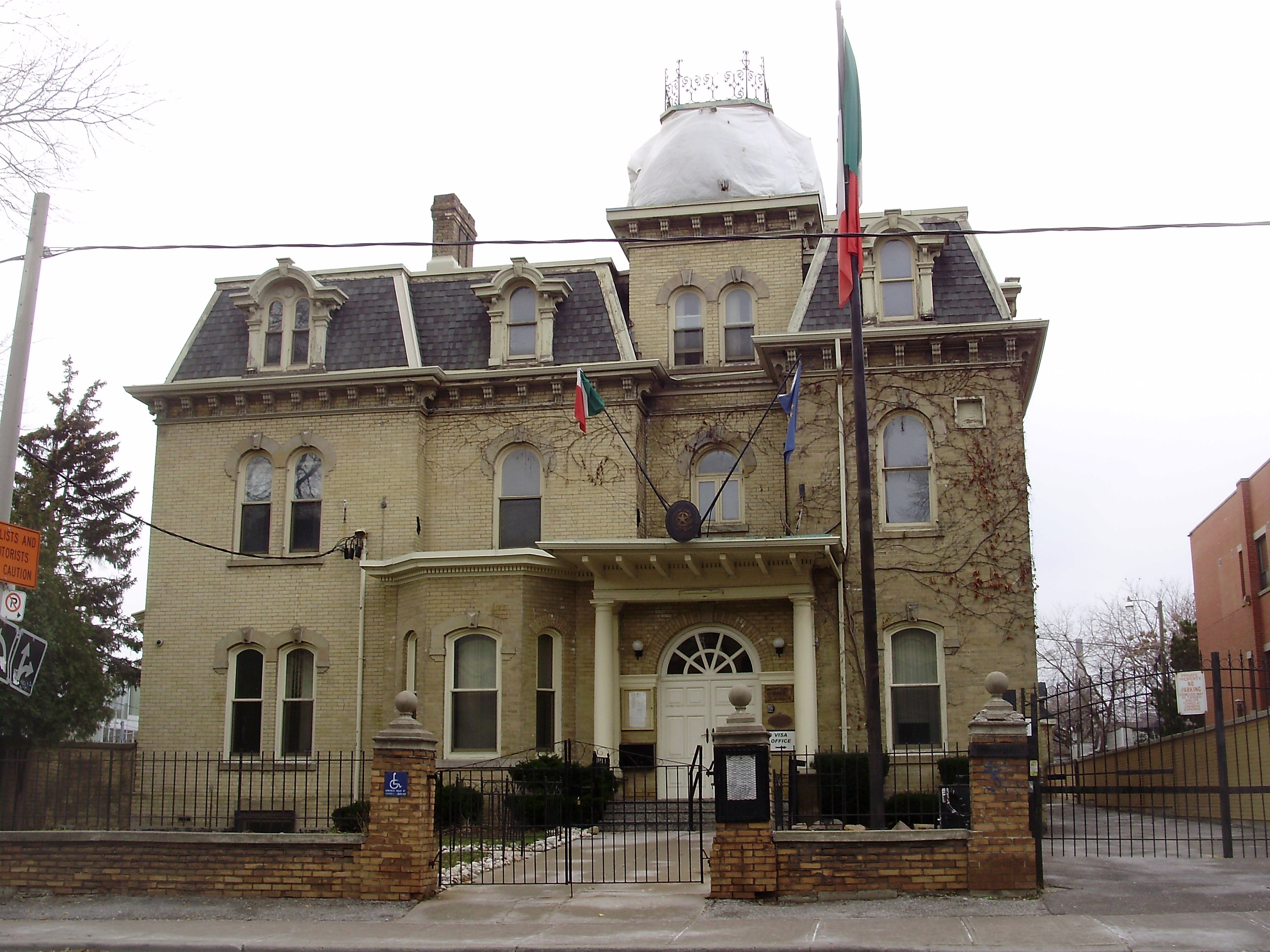
Consulate General of Italy located on Beverley Street at the corner of Dundas Street West.

Beverley Street is a minor road and major bike route located in the central area of Toronto, Ontario. The street was put in place in the 1870s, with large and coveted lots alongside. It is of general consensus among locals that the road acts as the division between the Grange and Baldwin Village neighborhoods on the east side of the street and Toronto's main Chinatown on the west side, respectively. It is designated bicycle route #35 in Toronto's cycle network.

Beverley Street is a two-lane road serving both directions with additional bicycle lanes along the curb side of the fully paved roadway. Due to these exclusive "bike lanes," the road acts as the principle north–south cyclist route for the western side of Toronto's downtown area. Beginning at Queen Street West and terminating at College Street, the road continues northbound turning into St. George Street, which runs through the St. George campus of the University of Toronto. The street is approximately one kilometre in length. Points of interest along the street include: the Grange Park, the Art Gallery of Ontario, Italian Consulate General, George Brown House, and Polish Combatants of WW2 Hall.

== In popular culture ==
- Charlotte Gray published a 1997 non-fiction book, Mrs. King: The Life and Times of Isabel Mackenzie King, that partially discusses life in and around Beverly Street.
- Blue Rodeo included a song on Beverley Street in its 2005 Are You Ready album.
