= Grange Park (neighbourhood) =

- Neighbourhood
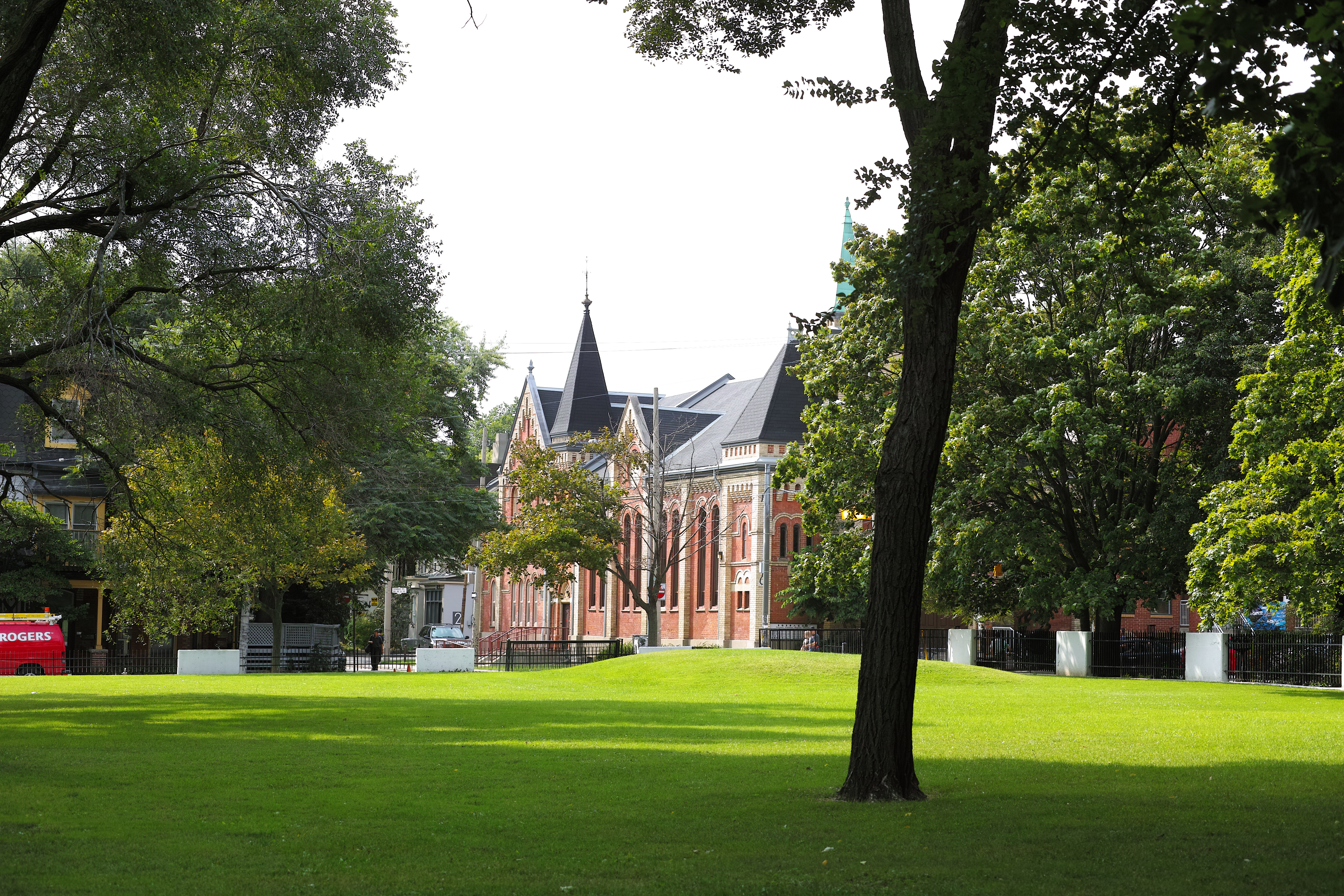
- Grange Park, a public park in the neighbourhood

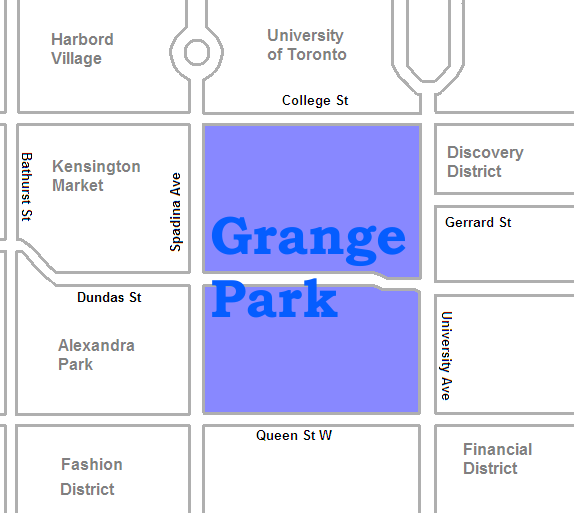

- Location within Toronto
- Coordinates: 43.653°N 79.393°W
- Country: Canada
- Province: Ontario
- City: Toronto

Government
  - Federal riding: Spadina—Fort York
  - Provincial riding: Spadina—Fort York
  - Municipal ward: Ward 10 Spadina—Fort York

Area
  - Total: 0.835 km^{2} (0.322 sq mi)

Population (2021)
  - Total: 10,487
  - Density: 12,559/km^{2} (32,530/sq mi)

Grange Park is a neighbourhood in downtown Toronto, Ontario, Canada. It is bounded on the west by Spadina Avenue, on the north by College Street, on the east by University Avenue and on the south by Queen Street West. It is within the 'Kensington-Chinatown' planning neighbourhood of the City of Toronto. Its name is derived from the Grange Park public park. The commercial businesses of Chinatown extend within this neighbourhood.

== History ==
Grange Park was initially an elite neighbourhood, with mansions lining Beverley Street. The neighbourhood took its name from The Grange, a mansion built in 1817 by G. D'Arcy Boulton, Auditor-General of Upper Canada and a member of the prominent Boulton family. The Grange is the oldest standing brick house in Toronto. It served as the first home of OCAD University, and today forms a wing of the Art Gallery of Ontario. Prominent early residents of the neighbourhood included George Brown, a Father of Confederation and founder of The Globe newspaper (186 Beverley Street) and the family of William Lyon Mackenzie King, Canada's longest-serving prime minister (147 Beverley Street).

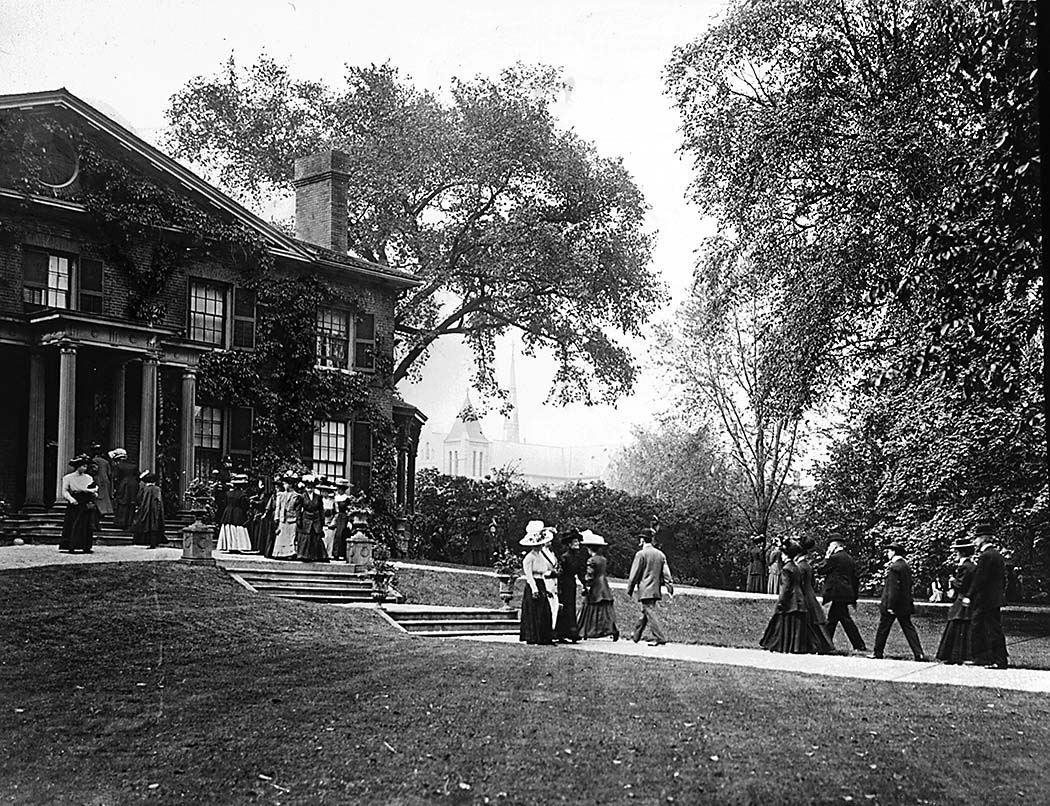
The neighbourhood took its name from The Grange, a Georgian styled residence built in 1817.

The area was transformed into a working class, immigrant community by 1900 with rows of workers' cottages. Many of the more prominent brick row houses, built in the Edwardian style, still survive in the neighbourhood today. By 1914, the area had become predominantly Jewish as Eastern European Jewish immigrants left The Ward and moved west of University Avenue towards Spadina Avenue. Synagogues and other community institutions were located on McCaul, Beverley and Cecil streets. Among the more famous Jewish residents was the family of architect Frank Gehry, whose grandparents owned a rowhouse at 15 Beverley Street. Gehry later recalled that his first exposure to art came at the Art Gallery of Ontario, for which he was later commissioned to design renovation completed in 2008.

By the 1960s, the Jewish community had given way to the Chinese community following the demolition of Toronto's original Chinatown to build the new City Hall, which migrated westward along Dundas Street to form the present-day Chinatown centered at Dundas and Spadina.

At the heart of the Neighbourhood lies Grange Park itself. The park was created in 1911, when Harriett Boulton gifted her family property to be home for a new Art Museum of Toronto (later evolving into the Art Gallery of Ontario). Upkeep of the expansive gardens to the south of Grange House was entrusted to the City of Toronto, which has maintained the lands as a public park ever since.

In 1852 a fall fair held by the Provincial Agricultural Association of Canada West took place just west of University Avenue from north of Dundas Street to south of College Street. The fair was mainly displaying animals (dairy cattle, sheep, horses), but also a refreshment area, floral hall and a midway (pleasure grounds). This was the second time for Toronto hosting, a fair that would be replaced by the Canadian National Exhibition in 1879.

== Character ==
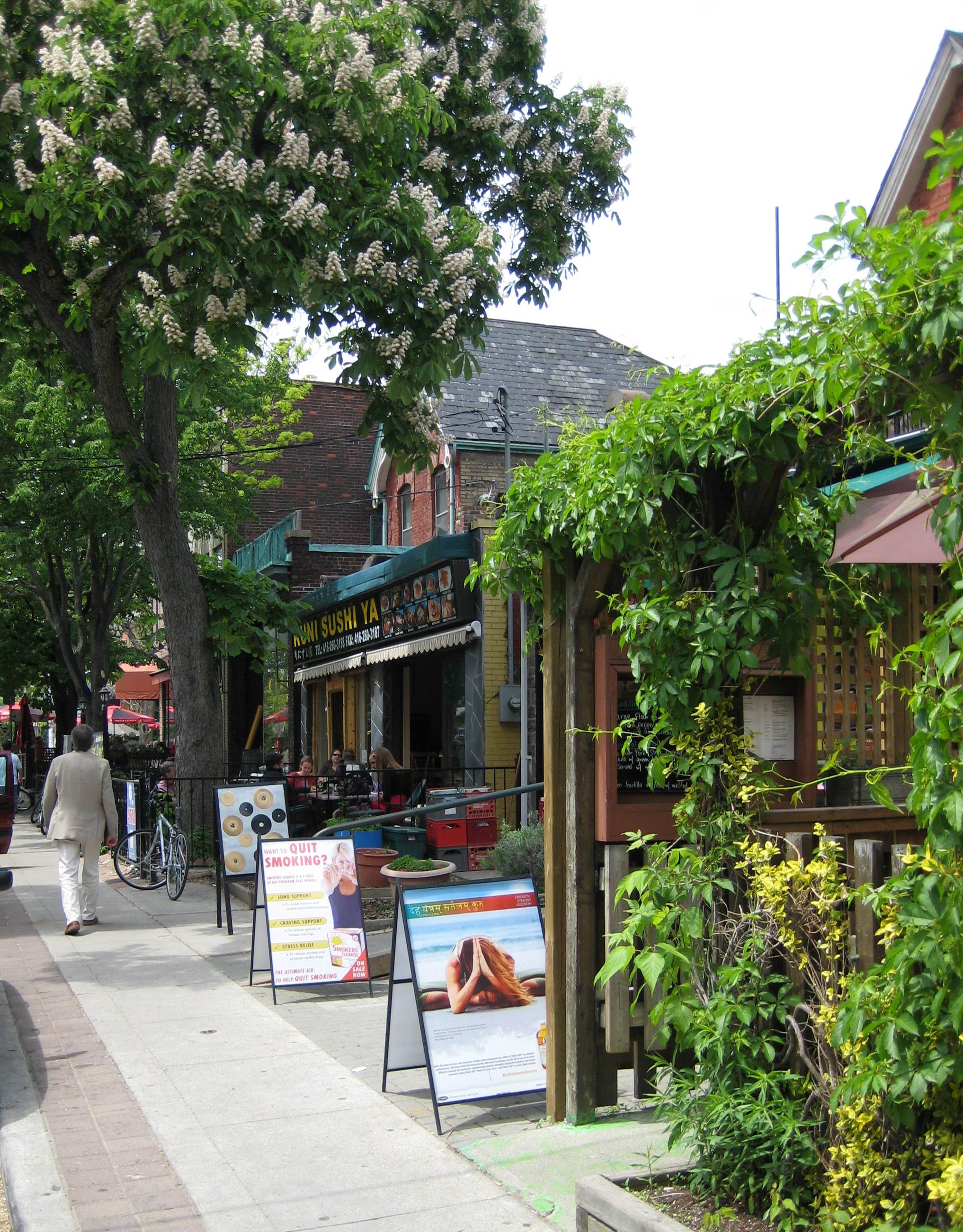
Shops in Baldwin Village a commercial enclave that has developed around Baldwin Avenue.

Grange Park is a mixed, but predominantly residential neighbourhood. The residential stock varies from working men's cottages built in the 1800s to semi-detached homes to mansions. Many of the buildings have been converted to commercial use, including art galleries within the vicinity of the Art Gallery of Ontario, restaurants and offices. Many of the homes are rented to students of the Ontario College of Art & Design, located on McCaul Street, and the St. George campus of the University of Toronto, located to the north.

In the western section, the businesses of Chinatown extend east from Spadina along Dundas to nearly Beverley, while the side streets have remained residential. The eastern section, along University Avenue, is predominantly institutional buildings facing on University Avenue. The buildings are higher than the neighbourhood and more recently built, and have expanded westward into the neighbourhood. Beverley Street north of Dundas has several century-old mansions on both sides of the street, some converted from residential to office uses, and others converted to multi-unit buildings.

East-west, the main street of the neighbourhood is Dundas Street, a street of commercial buildings. North-south, the main streets are Beverly Street and McCaul Street. A commercial enclave has developed around Baldwin Avenue between Beverley and McCaul Streets named 'Baldwin Village' of converted residences housing restaurants of numerous cuisines, and stores of arts, gifts and curios. The residences of the north side of Dundas Street between Beverley and McCaul (across from the AGO) have all been converted to art galleries.

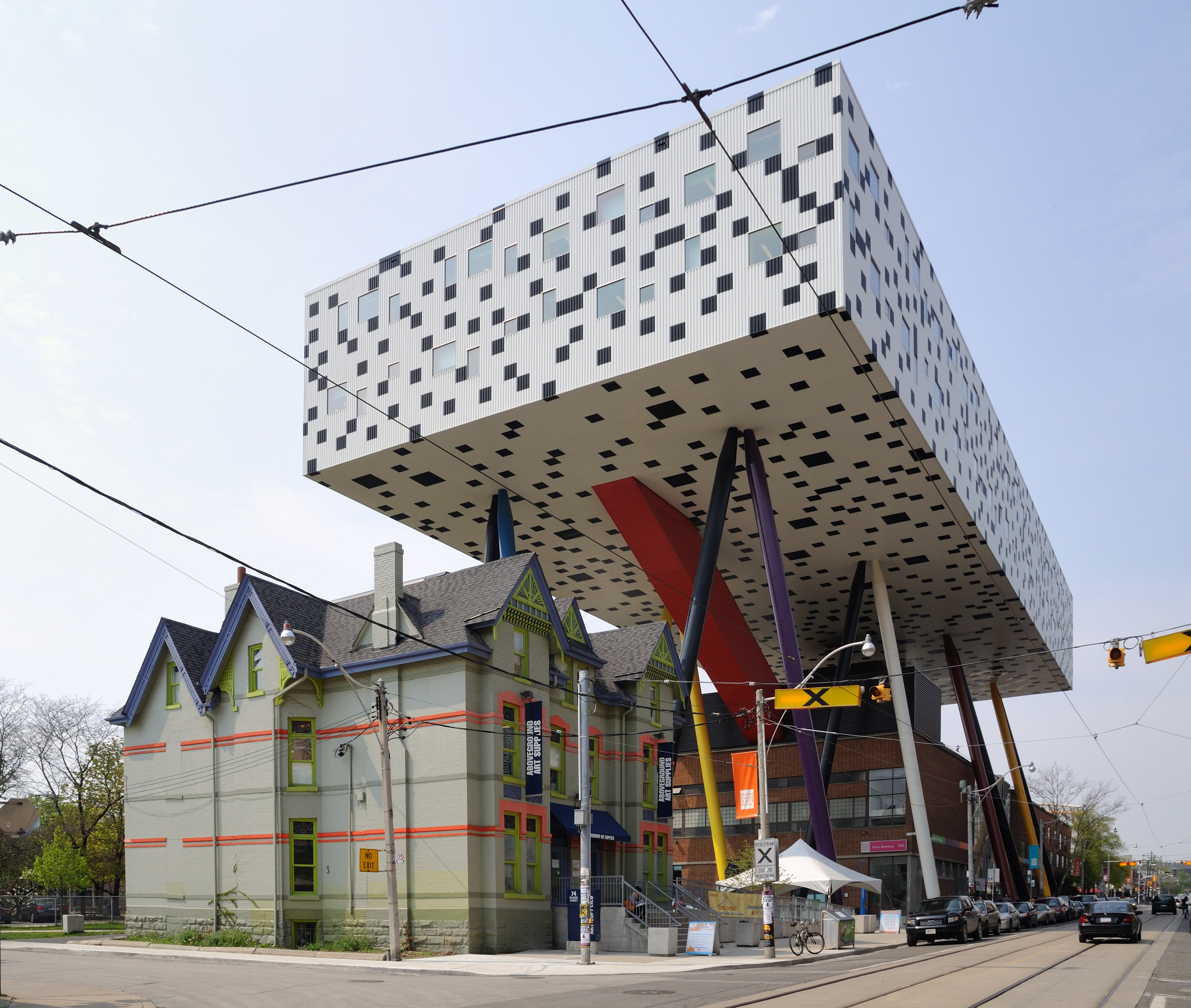
OCAD University's Sharp Centre for Design. The university's campus is located in Grange Park.

The homes of the east side of McCaul Street from Dundas south were demolished and the Village by The Grange residential and commercial complex was built. When it was built in 1980, it was a rare example in Toronto of a low-rise apartment complex with mixed commercial uses being built after several decades of high-rise apartment building construction in the downtown core.

=== Landmarks ===
- Art Gallery of Ontario - 317 Dundas Street West
- OCAD University - 100 McCaul Street
- The Grange - mansion, and original home of Art Gallery of Ontario
- George Brown House - home of the publisher, politician, and Father of Confederation George Brown - 186 Beverley Street
- St. George's Grange Park - 30 Stephanie Street
- Consulate General of Italy - 136 Beverley Street
- Village by the Grange - shopping and residential complex on the east side of McCaul Street.

== Transportation ==
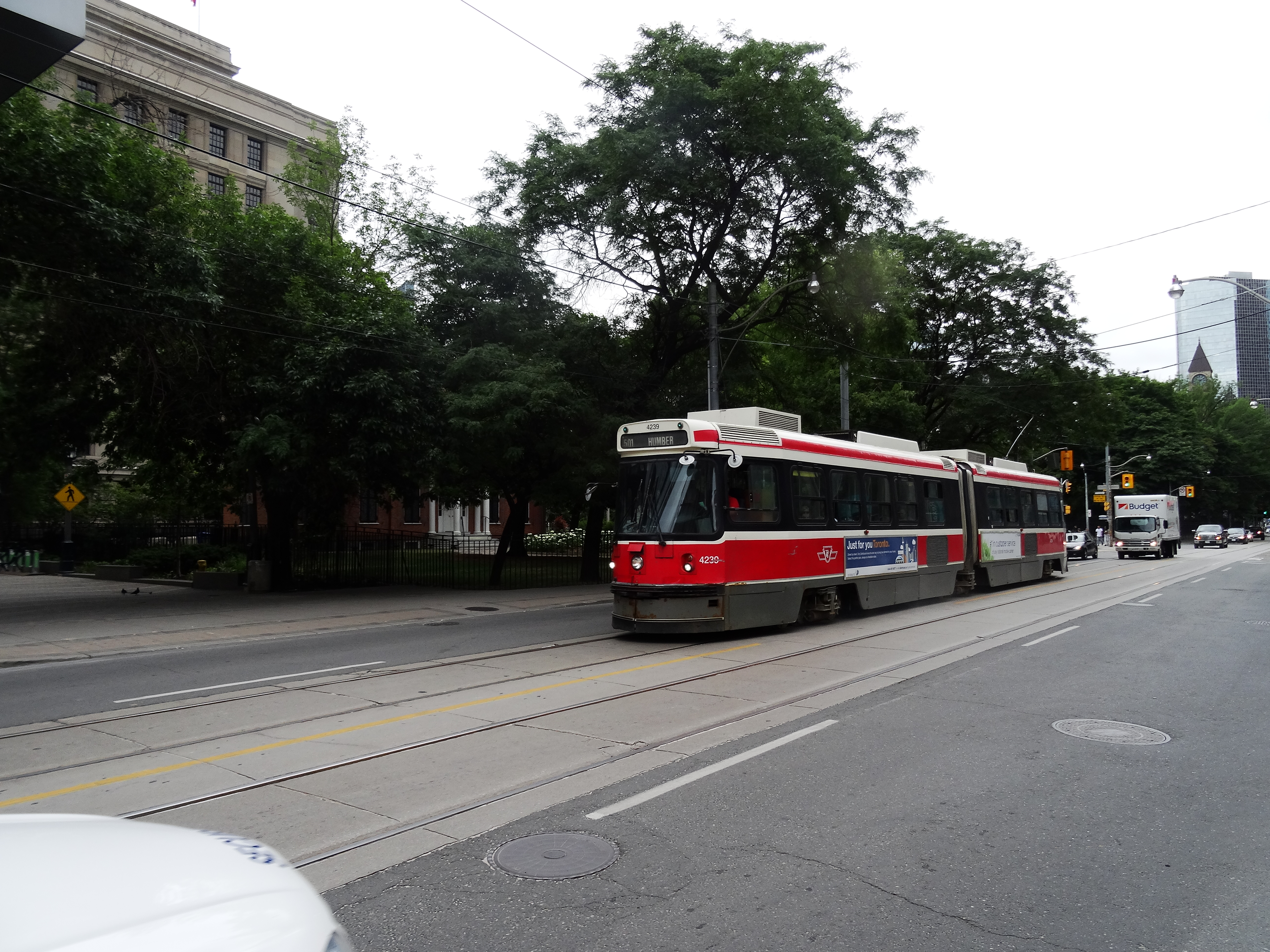
A streetcar entering the neighbourhood after crossing over University Avenue. The neighbourhood is serviced by several streetcar lines along with subways.

On the east, three subway stations on the Yonge-University-Spadina subway line stop at College Street (Queen's Park), Dundas Street (St. Patrick and Queen Street (Osgoode). There are streetcar lines on College, Dundas, Queen and Spadina, the Spadina line connecting to the Spadina station on the Bloor-Danforth subway line.

== Demographics ==
Historical population
Year	Pop.	±%
2006	9,007	—
2011	9,788	+8.7%
2016	9,981	+2.0%
2021	10,487	+5.1%

Census tracts 0036.00 and 0037.00 of the 2006 Canadian census cover Grange Park. According to that census, the neighbourhood has 9,007 residents. Average income is $35,277, slightly below the Toronto average. The ten most common languages spoken at home, after English, are:

1. Unspecified Chinese - 14.8%
2. Cantonese - 10.0%
3. Mandarin - 4.6%
4. Vietnamese - 1.9%
5. French - 0.8%
6. Korean - 0.4%
7. Tagalog - 0.4%
8. Punjabi - 0.4%
9. Hebrew - 0.3%
10. Persian - 0.2%

For Census Tract 5350036.00

According to Statistics Canada, in 2006 the neighbourhood had 4,505 residents. In 2011, this rose by 410 persons to 4915 persons. (Statistics Canada 2006, 2011)

Data on East Asian Ethnic Origin for 2006 and 2011

2006 Percentage Distribution of East Asian Population Origin

Origin	Amount	Percentage(%)
Korean	25	1.3
Filipino	60	3.2
Japanese	60	3.2
Vietnamese	115	6
Chinese	1635	86.3
Total	1895	100

Source: Statistics Canada 2006 Note: Percentages calculated up to one decimal place.

Origin	Amount	Percentage(%)
Japanese	50	2.2
Korean	80	3.7
Vietnamese	145	6.6
Filipino	170	7.8
Chinese	1745	79.7
Total	Example	100

2011 Percentage Distribution of East Asian Population Origin - CT 5350036.00

Source: Statistics Canada 2011 GNR: 27.5% Note: Percentages calculated up to one decimal point.

Those identifying as having East Asian origin (Chinese, Filipino, Vietnamese, Japanese and Korean), had increased from 42.1% (1895/4505) of the total population to 44.6% (2190/4915) of the total population between 2006 and 2011. Only those identifying with Japanese Ethnic Origin saw a decrease in population between 2006 and 2011.
