= St. George Street =

Street in Toronto, Ontario

Coordinates: 43.6672°N 79.3997°W

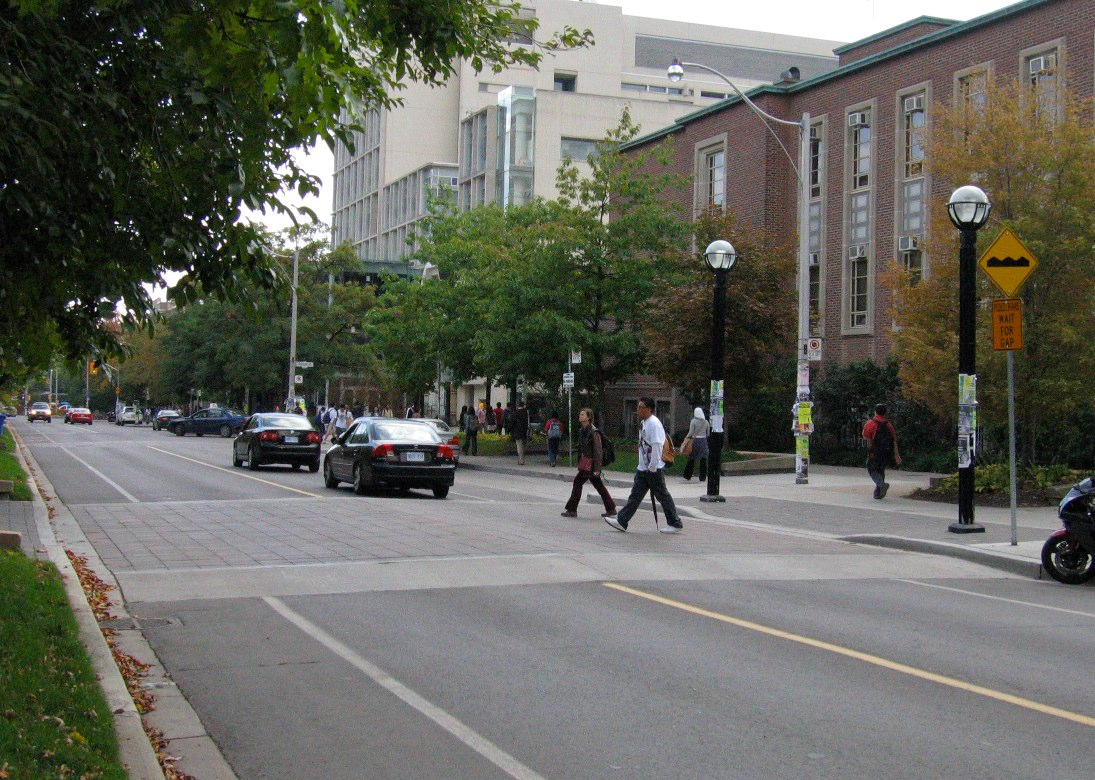
- The street through the University of Toronto's St. George campus in 2007
- Interactive map of St. George Street
- Namesake: Quetton St. George
- Maintained by: City of Toronto
- Location: Toronto
- South end: College Street (continues south as Beverley Street)
- Major junctions: Bloor Street West
- North end: Dupont Street

Other
Nearby arterial roads in Toronto
← Spadina Avenue	Avenue Road; Queen's Park Crescent →

St. George Street (or Saint George Street) is a roadway in downtown Toronto, Ontario, Canada. Named for 19th century French Royalist military officer Quetton St. George, the tree-lined avenue runs from Dupont Street in the north to College Street in the south, where it continues as Beverley Street.

The street runs through the St. George campus of the University of Toronto – of which it is the namesake – south of Bloor Street West, with its northern portion running through the Annex neighbourhood. It is also the namesake of the St. George subway station, located at St. George and Bloor Street West.

== History ==
From the nineteenth to the mid-twentieth century, St. George Street developed as a small avenue bounding the University of Toronto to the west. In the 1940s, it was widened to four lanes, becoming a major traffic artery. Following the second world war, the University of Toronto expanded its St. George campus to its west, acquiring and replacing many of the old houses along the street with large university buildings, most notably Sidney Smith Hall and Robarts Library. St. George Street thus became the primary north–south route through the campus.

The intersection with Bloor Street West saw a redesign and reconstruction from 2020–2024 to implement protected intersections and improve bike lane infrastructure due to its high volume of traffic.

== Landmarks ==
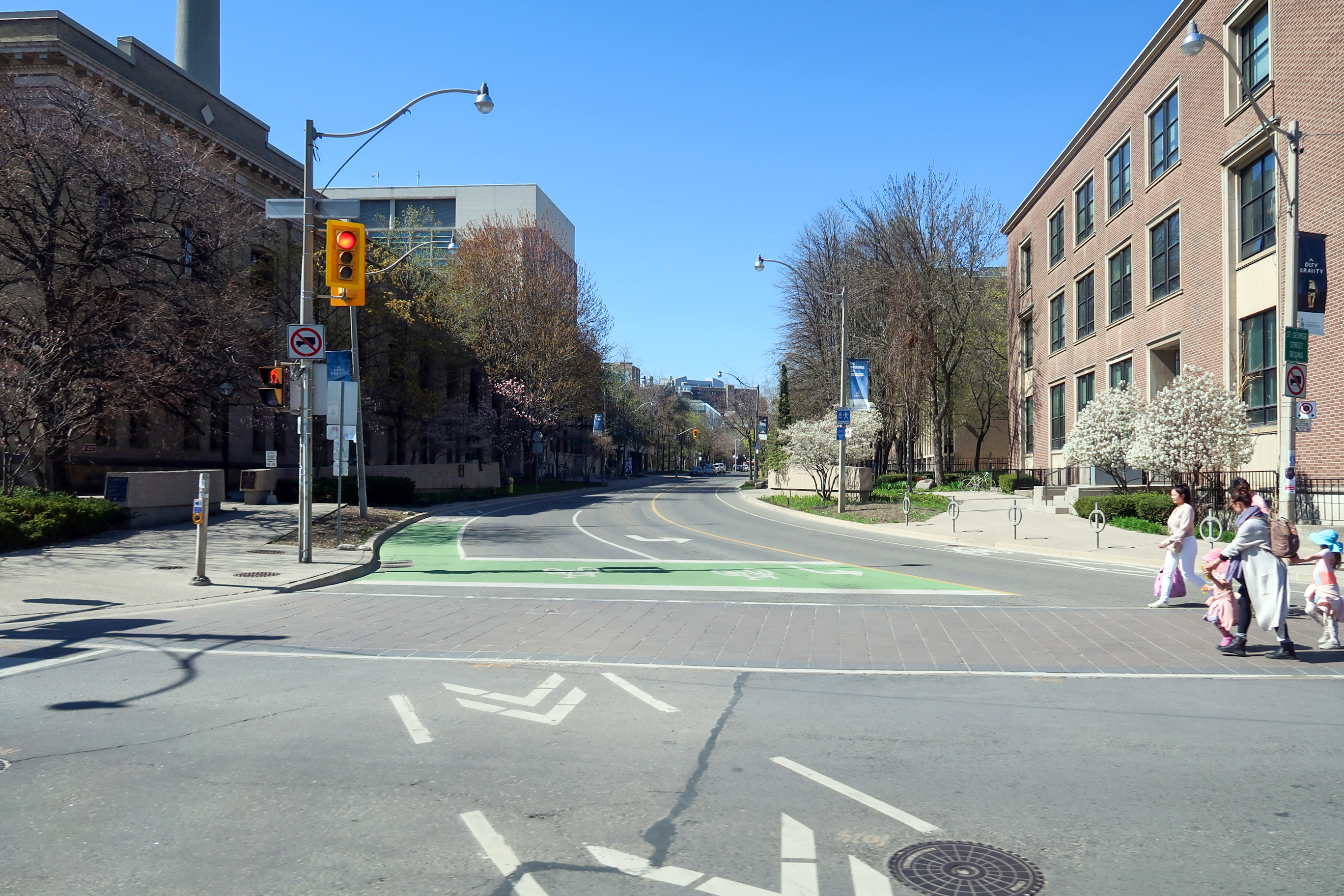
St. George Street facing north from College Street in 2022

Notable landmarks along St. George Street include (from south to north):

- Koffler Student Centre
- Bahen Centre for Information Technology
- Dunlap Institute for Astronomy and Astrophysics
- Knox College
- Sidney Smith Hall
- Newman Centre
- Thomas Fisher Rare Book Library
- John P. Robarts Research Library
- Rotman School of Management
- Innis College
- Woodsworth College
- Bata Shoe Museum
- York Club
- St. George station of the Toronto subway
