= College Street (Toronto) =

Street in Toronto, Ontario, Canada

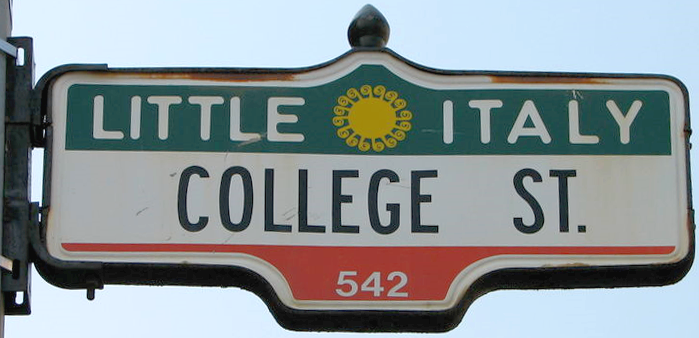

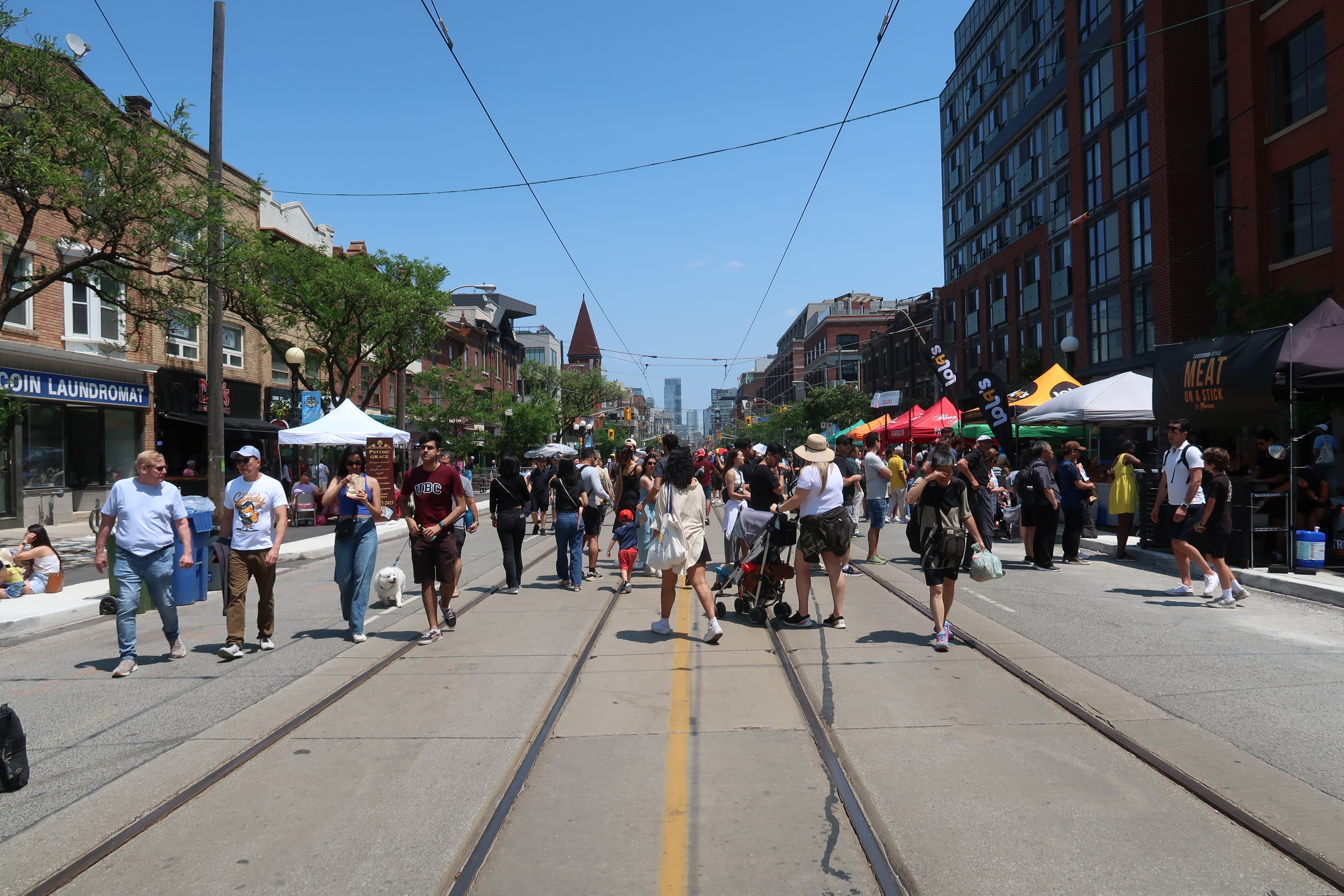
- College Street in Little Italy during festival (2023)

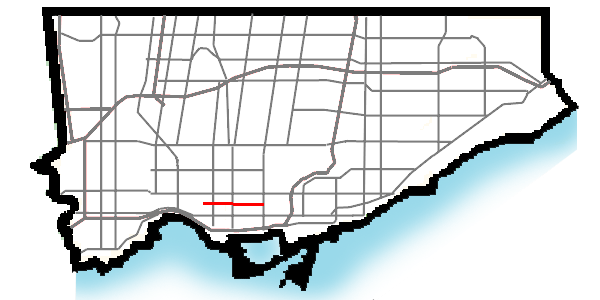
- Namesake: King's College (University of Toronto)
- Maintained by: City of Toronto
- Location: Toronto
- West end: Dundas Street West
- Major junctions: Dufferin Street; Ossington Avenue; Bathurst Street; Spadina Avenue; St. George Street; University Avenue
- East end: Yonge Street

Other
Nearby arterial roads in Toronto
← Dundas Street	Bloor Street →

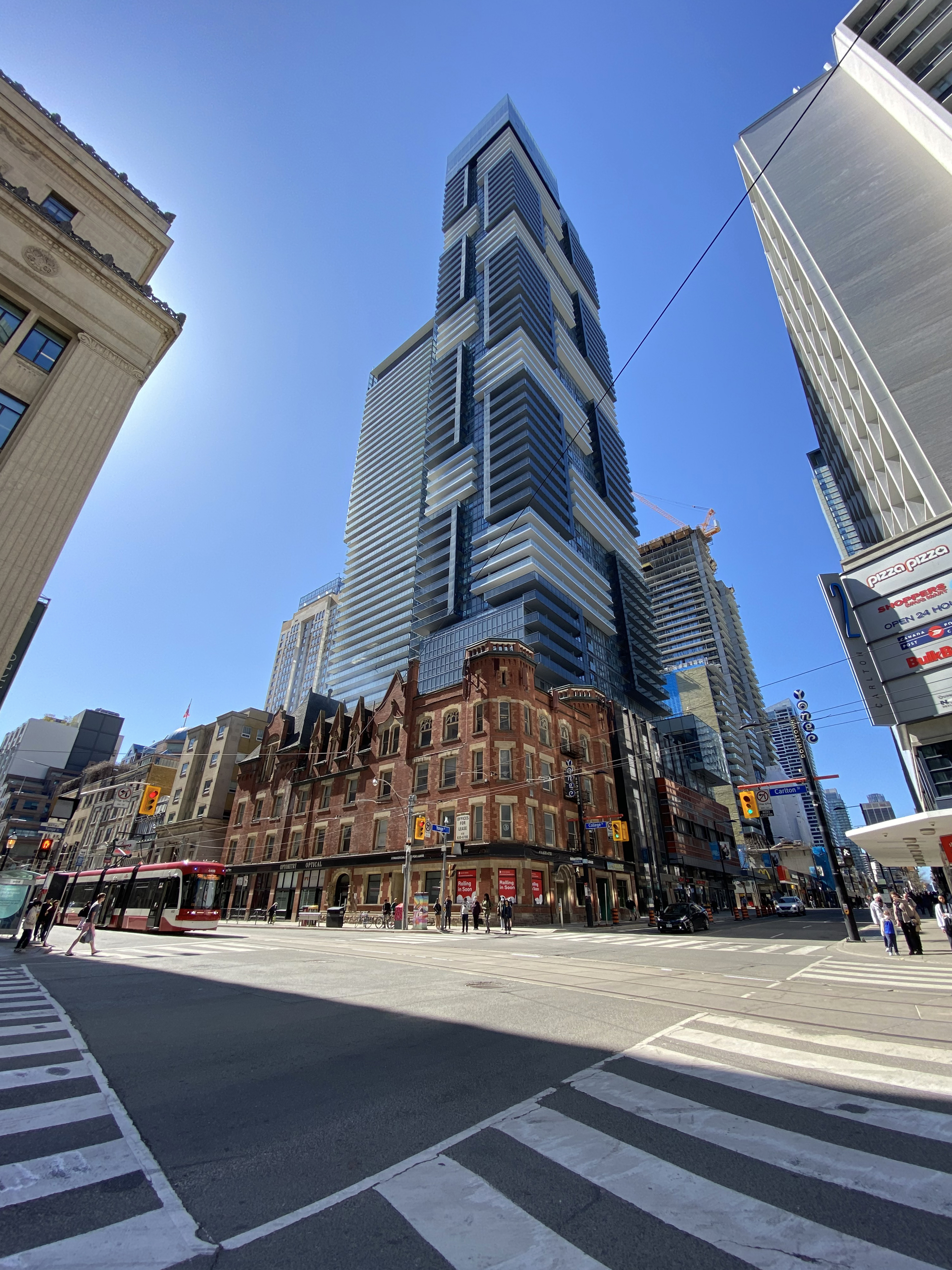
Northwest corner of Yonge and College Streets in 2022

College Street is a principal arterial thoroughfare in downtown Toronto, Canada, connecting former streetcar suburbs in the west with the city centre. The street is home to an ethnically diverse population in the western residential reaches, and institutions like the Ontario Legislature and the St. George campus of the University of Toronto in the downtown core. At Yonge Street, College continues to the east as Carlton Street.

== History ==
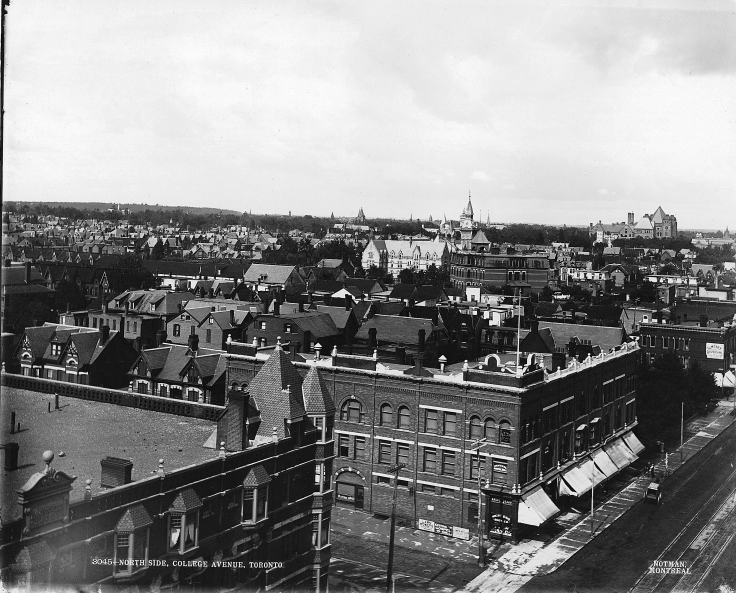
View of College Street, 1897

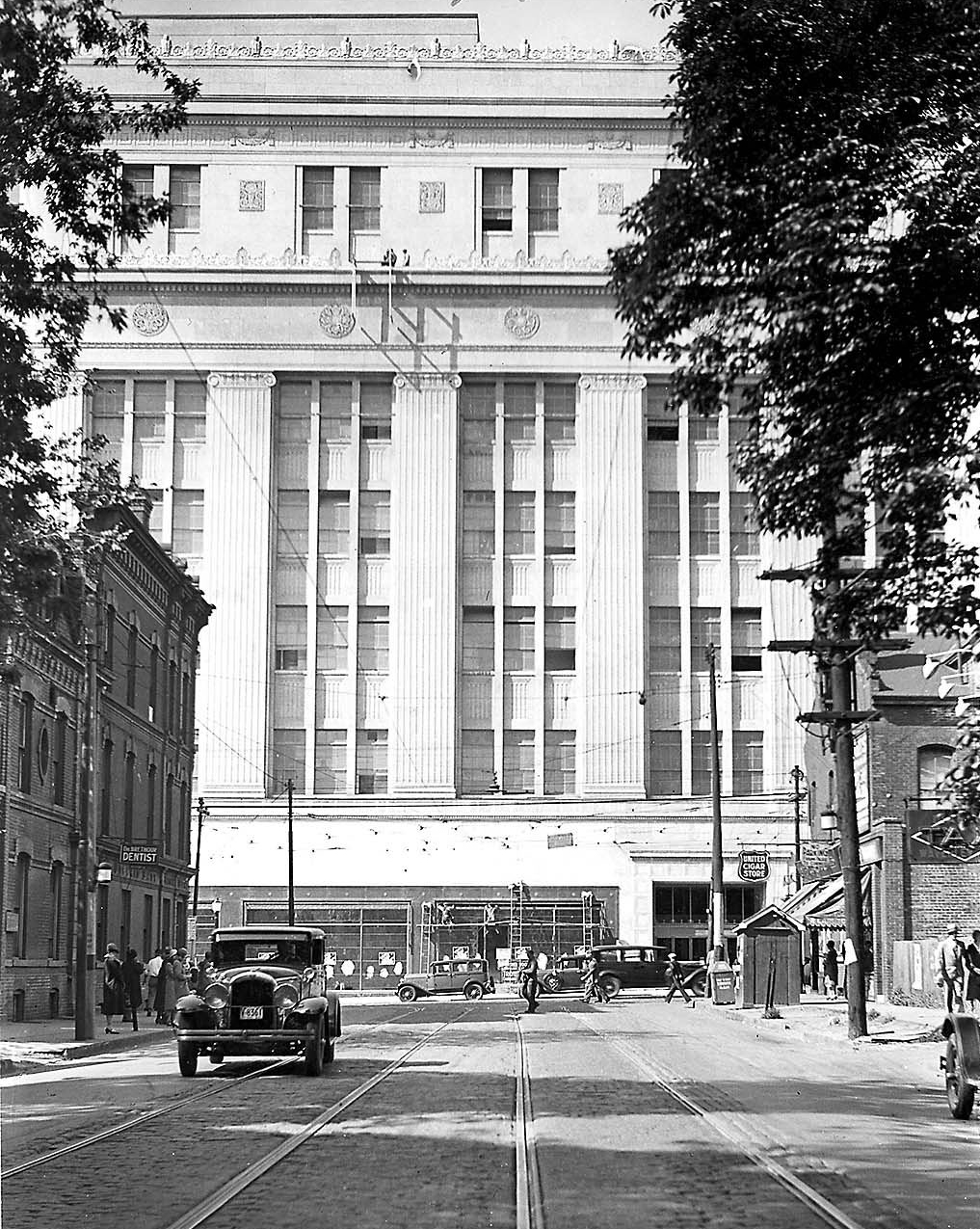
Eaton's College Street Store under construction, 1930; until June 1931, Carlton Street ended at Yonge Street

College Street takes its name from the University of Toronto, originally established as King's College. Between Spadina Avenue and Yonge Street, College marks the southern boundary of the original 1827 land grant for the college. The street was immediately proposed as an east–west route along the boundary, although the section was not built until 1859. The first section built was to the west of Spadina Avenue, through the estate of Robert Baldwin, who laid out the route. This section was built with the 100 feet (30 m) that was also used for Spadina. The section through Baldwin's estate was laid out in 1842, and the wide section was extended to Manning Avenue through the Denison and Crookshank estates.

After John Howard made the 1873 land grant which would become High Park, the Denison family proposed that the city extend College Street west as a sort of 'driving park' to access the new public lands. The path to the west of Manning Avenue was blocked by William Wakefield, who owned the land beyond and was holding out for a high sale price. The purchase of Wakefield's land did not take place until 1879. The right-of-way purchased through Wakefield's land was the standard 66 feet (20 m) width, rather than the 100 ft width to the east. The cost of the land may have been a factor.

Building the route west of Clinton Street was a challenge in the 1880s. At the time, a direct line west would have traveled through the ravines of Garrison and Brewery Creeks as far as Dufferin Street, the western city limit at the time. Instead, the road was rerouted along a north-western crescent running parallel to the creeks. The route then proceeded straight as far west as Havelock Street, just east of Dufferin.

At Havelock Street, the right-of-way intersected the property of Charles Lindsay. The alignment of College Street would have bisected his property, leaving unsaleable lot sizes on the south side of College. Lindsay was able to convince the city to reroute around his property to the north, with a 'kink' that exists to this day.

After the suburb of Brockton was annexed in the 1880s, the final section of College Street was built to Lansdowne Avenue in 1886. It was expected that College would be extended further, but just west of Lansdowne the rail lines created a barrier. A precursor to an extended College Street, called Grenadier Road, was laid out in the Roncesvalles district, and on the west side of High Park in Swansea (now Morningside) as well as a section in Etobicoke (now Berry Road), but connections to those streets were never made.

Streetcar service extended as far west as Dufferin by 1889, and (via Dundas Street) to High Park by 1893. Sunday operation of the line to High Park did not begin until 1897, after a citywide plebiscite was held on the issue of Sunday streetcar operation. The streetcar led to the development of residential sub-divisions on both sides, with street frontages actually empty. The frontages were used for billboards, with development on the street only filling up the lots on both sides by World War I, although some vacant lots existed into the 1920s.

== Route description ==
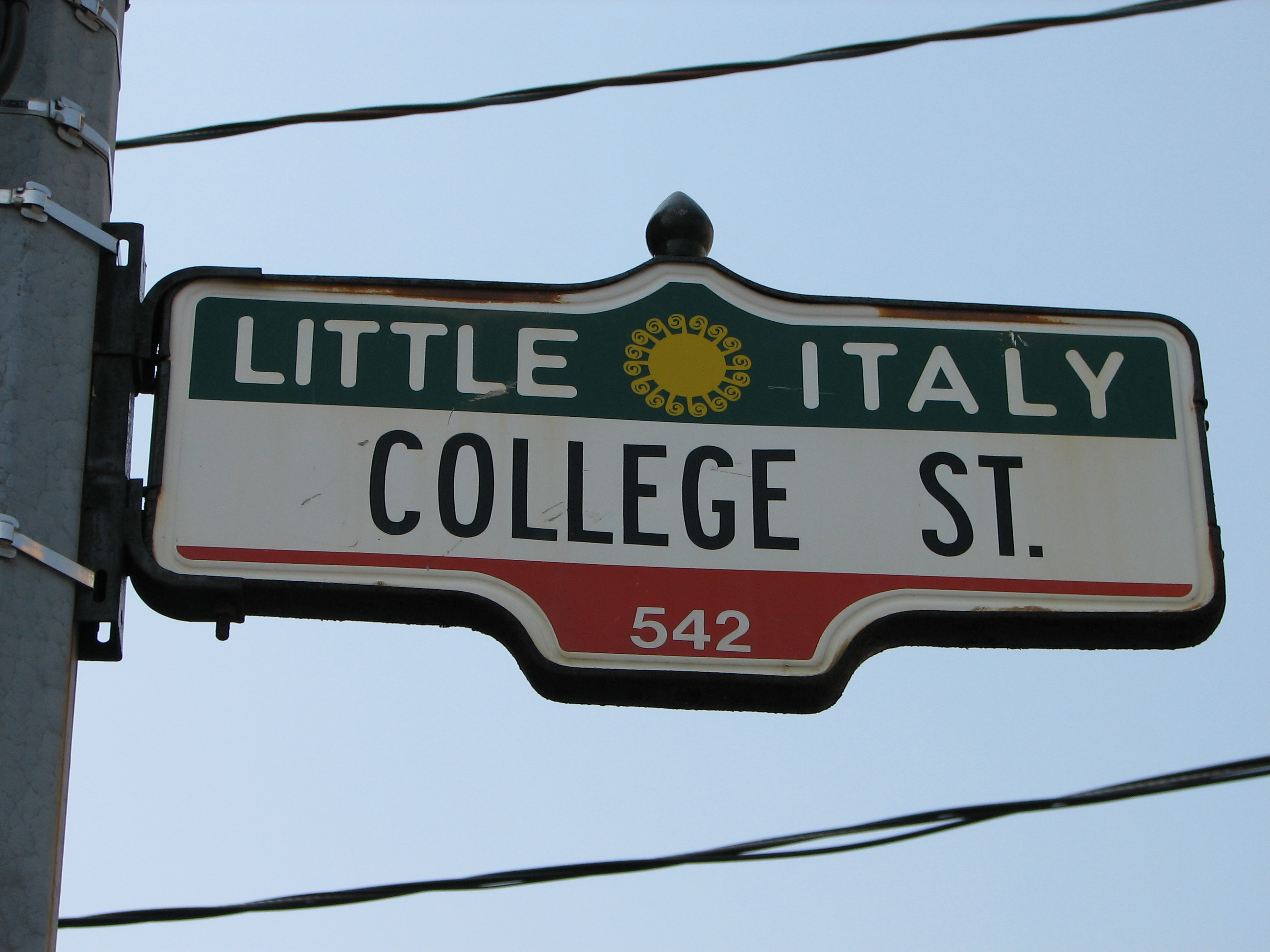
A typical College street sign in Little Italy, Toronto

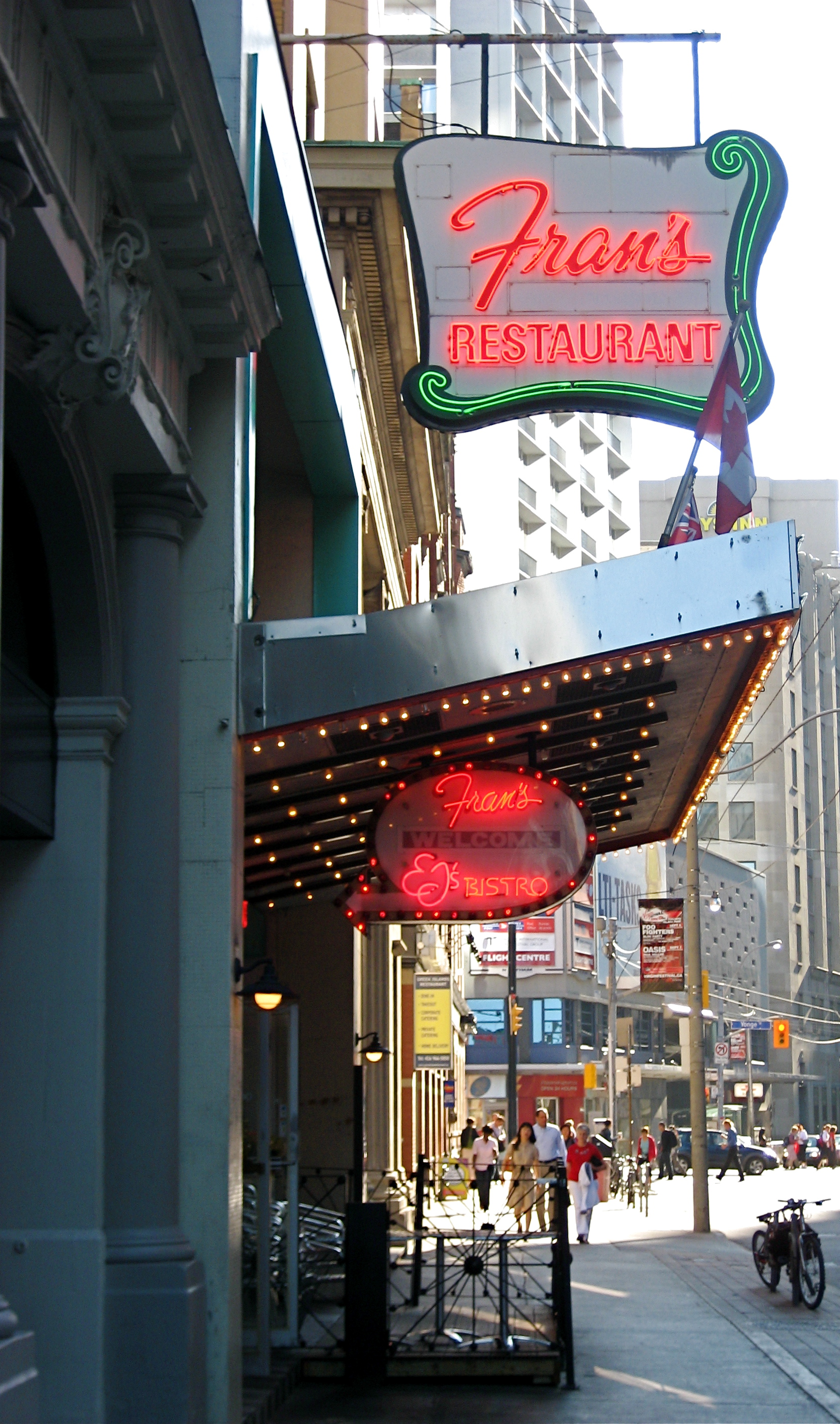
Fran's Restaurant, a 24-hour diner on College Street

The intersection at Yonge Street is dominated by the landmark College Park complex, which once housed an Eaton's department store. This historic building is now used for retail, office, and residential purposes.

At University Avenue, College traverses a major institutional district, with the Ontario Legislature, the University of Toronto St. George, and the MaRS Discovery District marking one of the city's most important and historic intersections. The district also features a concentration of teaching hospitals, including Toronto General Hospital, the Hospital for Sick Children, Princess Margaret Cancer Centre, Mount Sinai Hospital, and Toronto Rehab.

Between University and Spadina Avenue the street serves as the northern boundary of the Grange Park neighbourhood, a mixed-residential area with student housing and historic residences such as George Brown House. It is a southern boundary of the University of Toronto's St. George campus where it meets the south end of St. George Street midway through this portion of the campus. The intersection at Spadina Avenue represents the northern boundary of the city's principal Chinatown, as well as the western boundary of the St. George campus. The intersection is marked by the focal point of 1 Spadina Crescent in a roundabout to the north, and a complex rail interchange where the busy 510 Spadina streetcar route, running on a dedicated right-of-way, meets the 506 Carlton route.

The section of College west of Spadina is home to a variety of computer stores, known as a destination for cheap computer parts. This stretch of College also forms the northern border of Kensington Market.

West of Bathurst Street, College is the heart of Toronto's Little Italy and is dotted with restaurants and trendy bars. Further west, College is primarily residential.

=== Public transit ===
The Toronto Transit Commission's 506 Carlton streetcar route runs along College and Carlton Streets. College is served by Queen's Park station and College station on the University and Yonge branches, respectively, of the Yonge-University-Spadina subway line.

== Major intersection ==
The following is a list of major intersections along College Street

- Dundas Street
- Lansdowne Avenue
- Ossington Avenue
- Bathurst Street
- Spadina Avenue
- St. George Street
- University Avenue (south) / Queen's Park Crescent (north)
- Bay Street
- Yonge Street
