= St. George station =

Toronto subway station

St. George
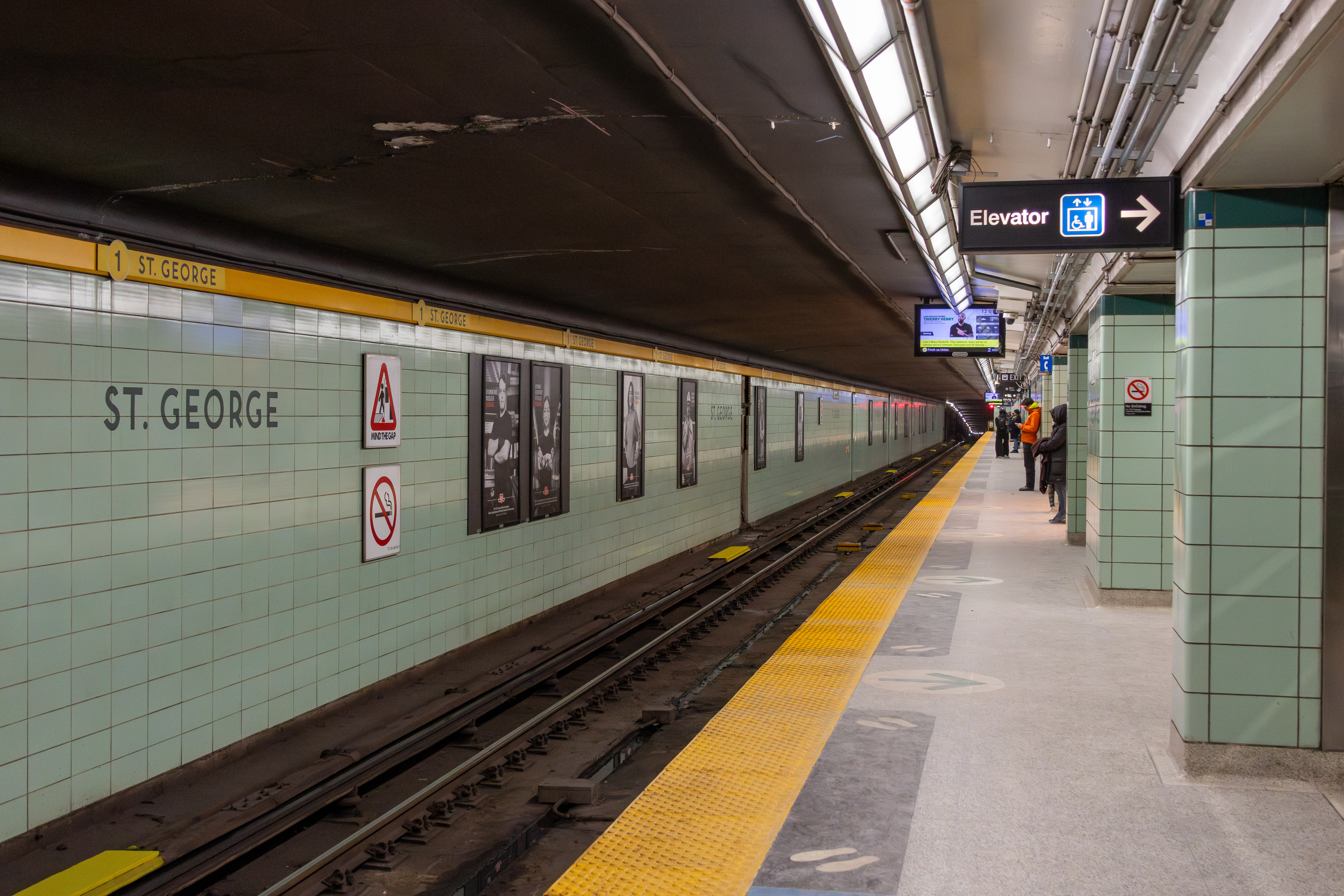
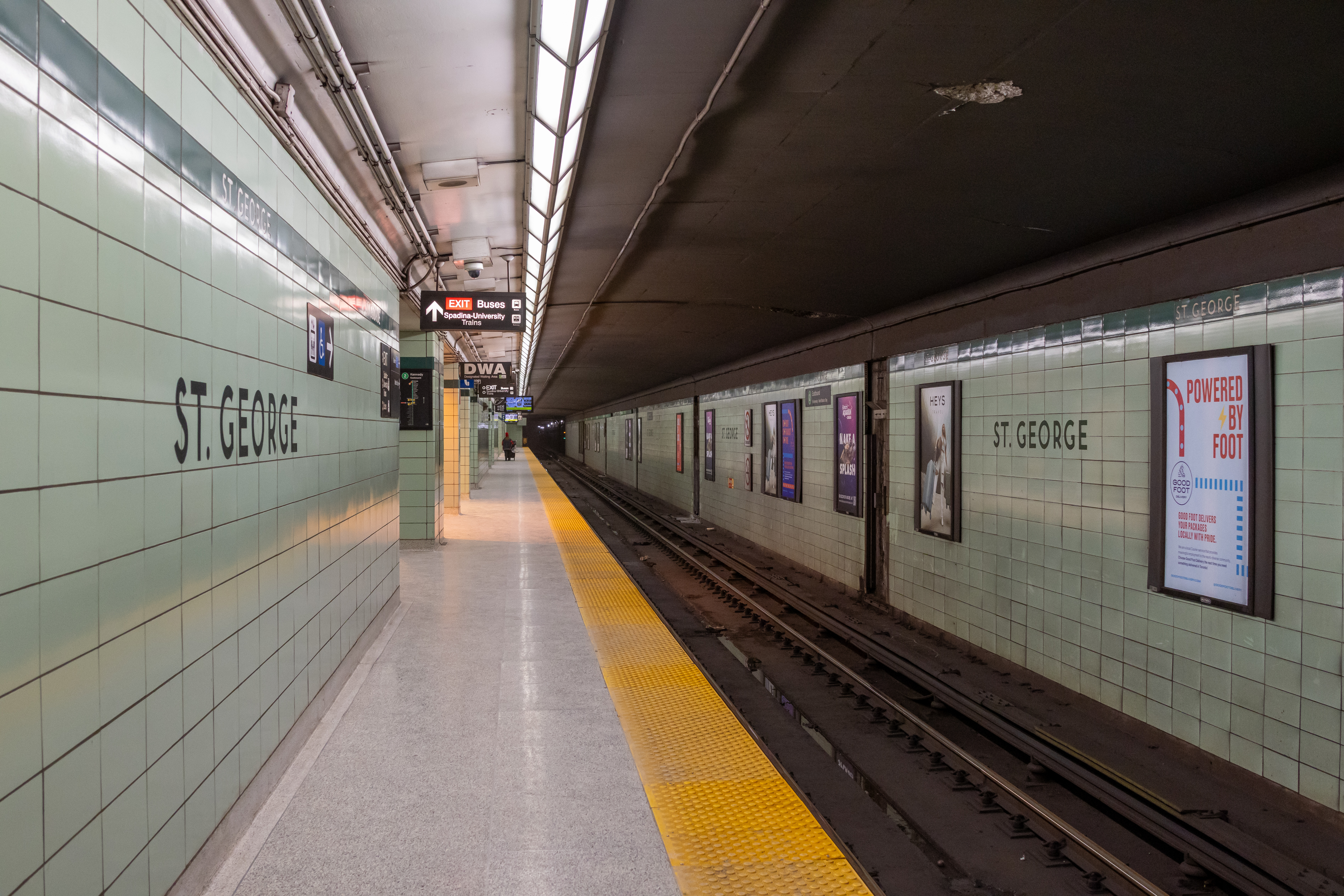
- Line 1 platform Line 2 platform

General information
- Location: 139 St. George Street; Toronto, Ontario; Canada
- Coordinates: 43°40′06″N 79°23′56″W
- Platforms: Centre platform (Line 1 and Line 2)
- Tracks: 4 (2 per line)
- Connections: TTC buses: 26 Dupont; 300 Bloor–Danforth

Construction
- Structure type: Underground
- Platform levels: 2
- Accessible: Yes

Other information
- Website: Official station page

History
- Opened: Line 1: February 28, 1963; 63 years ago; Line 2: February 26, 1966; 60 years ago

Passengers
- 2023–2024: 101,128 (Line 1); 108,866 (Line 2); 209,994 (total)
- Rank: 2 of 70

Services
Preceding station	Toronto Transit Commission	Following station
Spadina towards Vaughan	Line 1 Yonge–University	Museum towards Finch
Spadina towards Kipling	Line 2 Bloor–Danforth	Bay towards Kennedy
Track layout
Upper level
Lower level
Location

St. George is a station on Line 1 Yonge–University and Line 2 Bloor–Danforth of the Toronto subway. It is located north of Bloor Street West between St. George Street and Bedford Road, near the north-central portion of the University of Toronto St. George campus.

The station opened in 1963 as the northern terminus of Line 1's extension under University Avenue, and its second platform opened alongside Line 2 in 1966. St. George is the second-busiest station in the system after Bloor–Yonge station, serving a combined total of approximately 209,994 people a day.

== Entrances ==
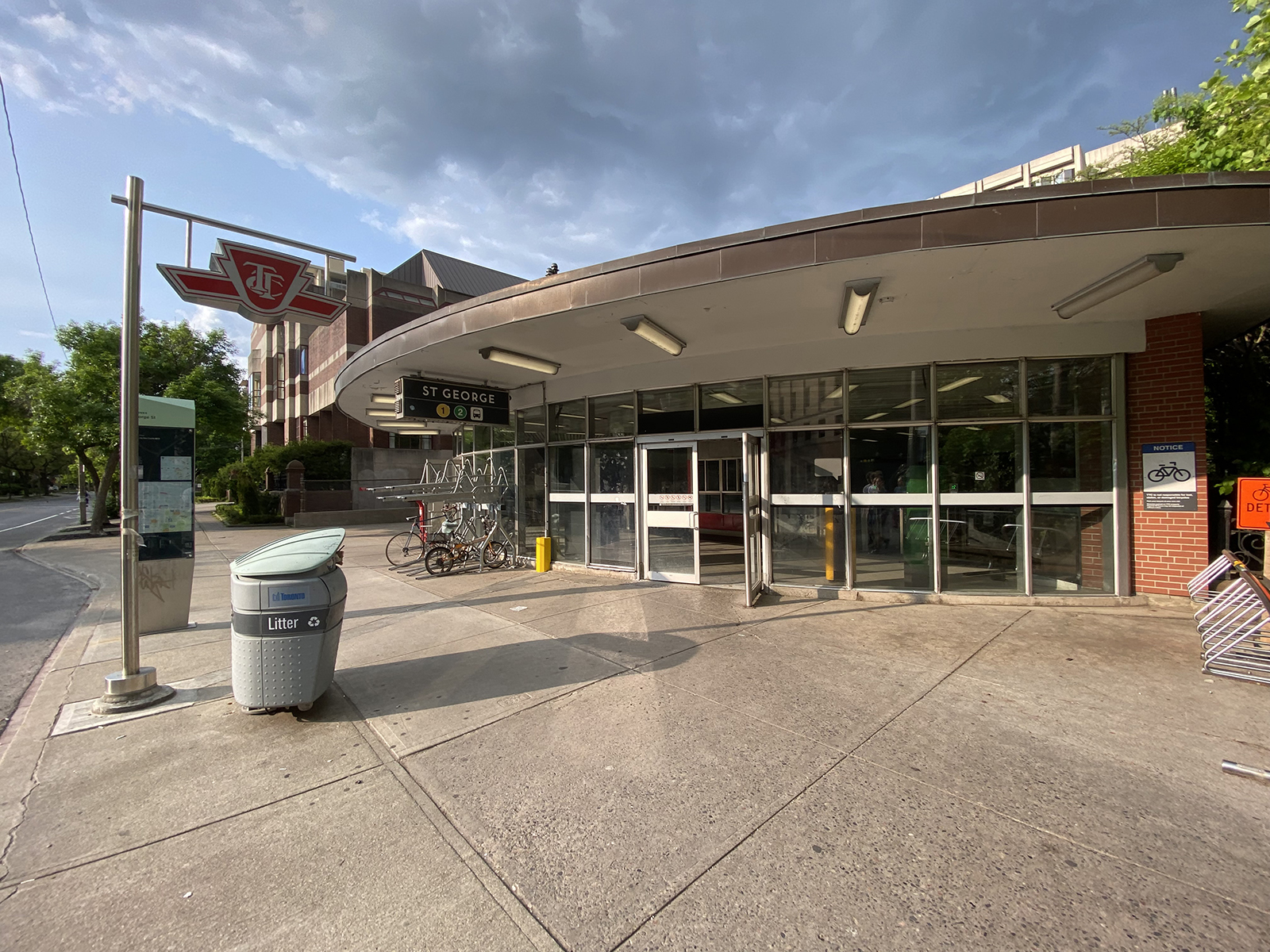
St. George Street entrance

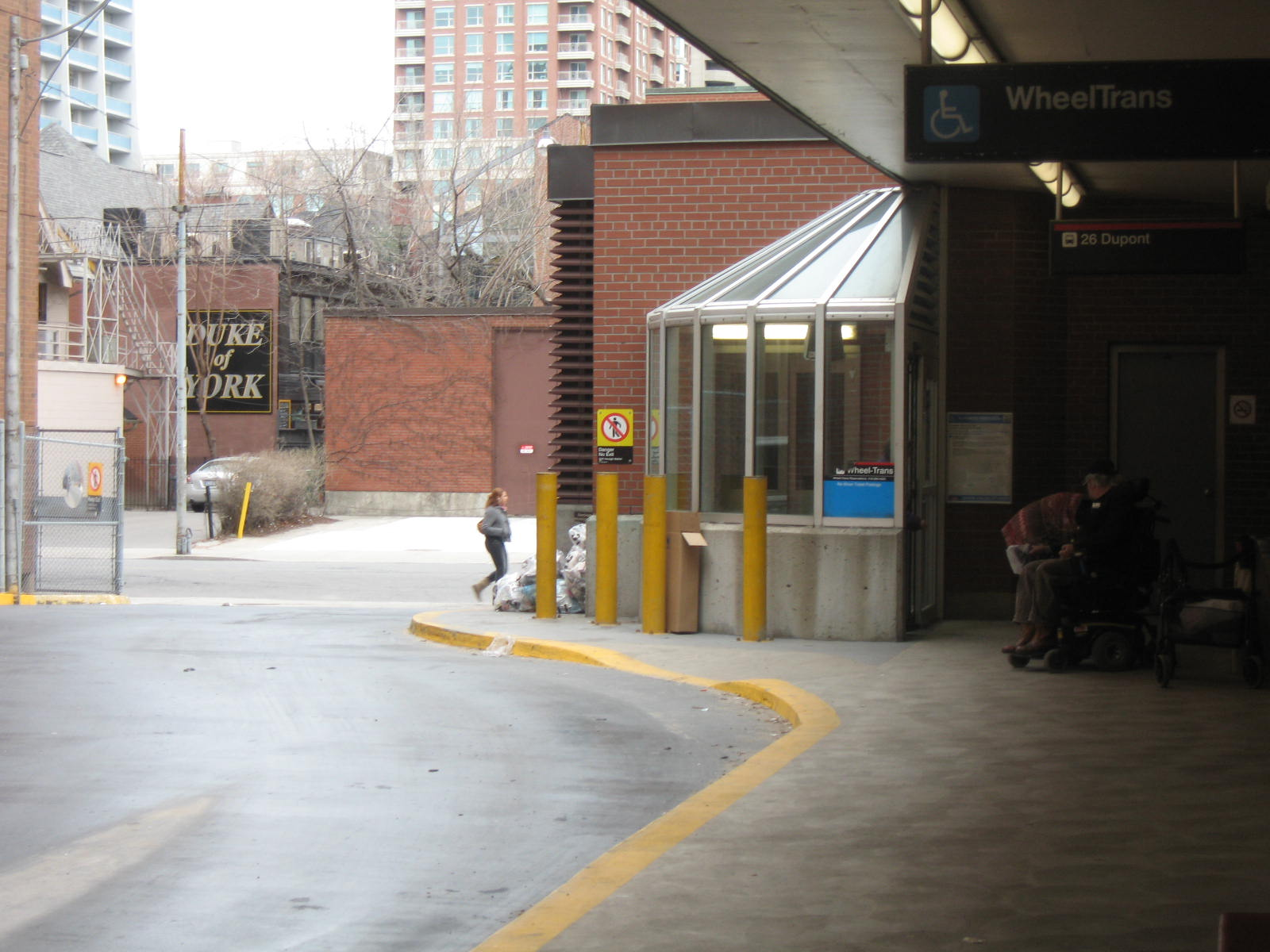
Bedford Road bus platform

- The St. George Street entrance is an unstaffed automatic entrance. It is located on the east side of St. George Street just north of Bloor Street West at 43°40′05.75″N 79°23′59.6″W
- The Bedford entrance is wheelchair accessible and is staffed during all hours of operation. It is located on the west side of Bedford Road just north of Bloor Street West at 43°40′07.25″N 79°23′52.4″W. Patrons board the 26 Dupont bus from a platform within the station's fare-paid area.
- There is also an unstaffed automatic entrance from Ontario Institute for Studies in Education of the University of Toronto.

== History ==
The station was first opened on February 28, 1963, as the northern terminus for the Yonge–University Line (under University Avenue), followed by the Bloor–Danforth Line on February 26, 1966.

Between 1963 and 1966, there was a direct surface connection at the Bedford Road subway entrance to Bloor and Danforth streetcars. The "Bedford Loop" was immediately south of the station structure and had opened in 1954 to provide a short turn facility for westbound streetcars serving Bloor station on the new Yonge Subway. Streetcars entered from Bedford Road, turned west into the loop beside the station, and exited south on to Bloor Street. The platform was on the east side of what is now the Ontario Institute for Studies in Education at the University of Toronto, with a TTC transformer station constructed at the former entrance and the exit where the Bloor–Bedford Parkette is situated. This loop gave passengers travelling in peak hours a more direct connection between the subway and eastbound and westbound streetcars than walking to/from the curbside stops. The loop closed in February 1966 when streetcar routes were replaced by the Bloor–Danforth line.

In 1999, this station became accessible with elevators.

In late August 2019, the TTC installed platform door markers along the edge of the station's southbound platform as a pilot to improve customer flow when a southbound train is in station. These indicate where customers waiting to board should stand to avoid obstructing customers leaving the train. Automated train control (ATC) ensures that train doors and decals perfectly match up. Blue decals are located near the train doors for accessible seating; customers with mobility problems have priority boarding.

=== Interlining ===
St. George and Bay stations are both two-level stations with two platforms, with Line 1 on the upper level, and Line 2 on the lower level at St. George. Between these stations and Museum is a full double-track, grade-separated wye junction. The tracks to and from Museum connect to the upper-level platforms at St. George and the lower-level platforms at Bay stations, while the tracks along Bloor use the lower level at St. George and the upper level at Bay. From February to September 1966, all three sides of the wye were used in regular service: from each of three termini—Eglinton, Keele, and Woodbine—trains ran alternately to the other two (between Eglinton and Museum they went via Union).

After the six months of interlining, the Bloor–Danforth Line became a separate route and the lower platforms at Bay (sometimes called Lower Bay) were closed. The upper-level platforms at St. George became the terminus of the Yonge–University line until 1978, when the extension to Wilson was opened. Lower Bay is sometimes used as a movie or TV set, and has been used for platform-surface experiments.

=== Paul Arthur signage ===
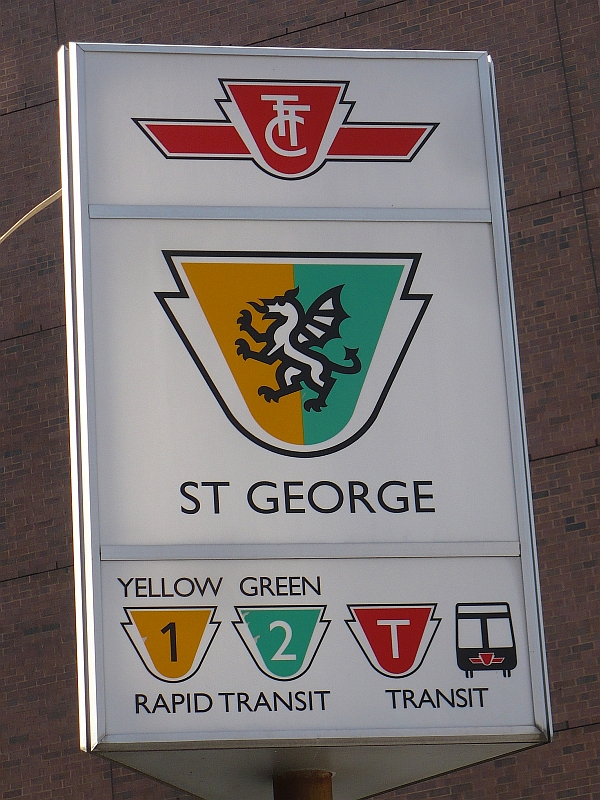
An exterior sign on the station featuring Arthur's experimental designs

Some areas of the station contain wayfinding signage with the image of a crest with a dragon, referencing the Christian legend of St. George. However, St. George Street is actually named for Quetton St. George, a French-born British citizen who lived in Toronto in the 19th century. The signs were designed by Paul Arthur and installed in 1993 as part of a new system of wayfinding signage, which was to be implemented in the entire subway system. Ultimately, the TTC did not go through with the project but did not remove the prototypes either, preserving some of Arthur's designs.

A further wayfinding project began implementation in 2014: using circles with the colour and number of each line to identify them more easily. Signage for that project rolled out at Bloor–Yonge station in March of that year, with St. George set to be the next to follow.

== Subway infrastructure in the vicinity ==
Both platforms lie on an east–west alignment, with the Line 1 platform being one of three platforms on that line with an east–west orientation, the others being Union and Downsview Park. Upon leaving the station, the line curves south by 90 degrees to run under Queen's Park (the street). The two tracks split into separate tunnels in this area, briefly running at different levels to form a grade-separated junction with the second pair of link tracks from the Bloor–Danforth line, which curves in from the east.

== Tenants ==
- Gateway Newstands (one at the St. George entrance/exit and another at the Bedford entrance/exit)

== Nearby landmarks ==
Nearby landmarks include the University of Toronto St. George, the oldest and largest campus of the University of Toronto. Additionally, the Bata Shoe Museum, University of Toronto Schools, the Royal Conservatory of Music, the Chinese Consul General, the Royal Ontario Museum, and the York Club are nearby.

== Surface connections ==
TTC routes serving the station include:

Route	Name	Additional information
26	Dupont	Westbound to Jane station
