= Quetton St. George =

French Royalist military officer, merchant and landowner

Laurent Quetton St. George
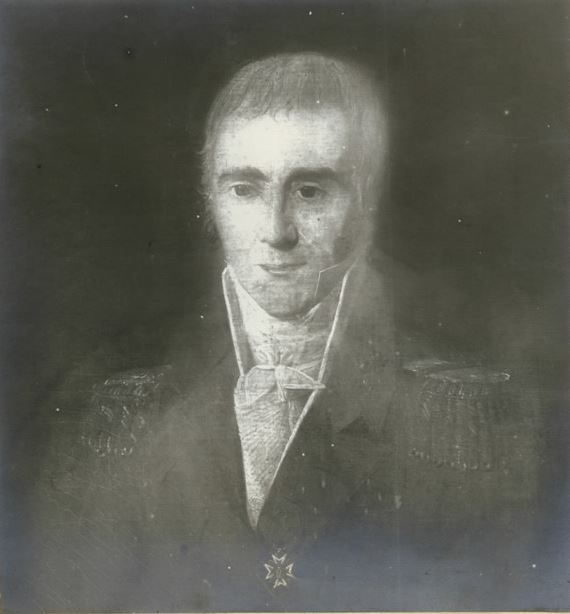
- Born: Laurent Quet; 4 June 1771; France
- Died: 8 June 1821 (aged 50); Orléans, France
- Other names: Lawrence Quetton St. George
- Occupations: Military officer, merchant and landowner
- Spouse: Adèle de Barbeyrac (m. 1819)
- Partner: Marguerite Vallière
- Children: 3

Laurent Quetton St. George (born Laurent Quet; 4 June 1771 – 8 June 1821) was a French Royalist military officer who became a merchant and landowner in Upper Canada.

== Early years in France ==
Born in Vérargues near Montpellier, France, he was forced into exile by the French Revolution that led to the fall of the king of France.

He initially settled in the Rhineland and then joined the Légion de Béon around 1794–1795. He subsequently marched with the Royalist army to Brittany in 1796.

== Settling in Upper Canada ==
He then acquired land offered to French Royalists in Upper Canada and arrived via Quebec in 1798. He was led by Joseph-Geneviève de Puisaye to land located in Windham, where his son Henri would live in his later years.

He spent time as a fur trader with natives around Lake Simcoe and Lake Couchiching before becoming a merchant in 1802 at York, Upper Canada (now Toronto). He worked with the British Army and English-speakers associated in Upper Canada. He formed a friendship with John Spread Baldwin and William Warren Baldwin, but his imperfect English meant he did not form a close bond with others in Upper Canada.

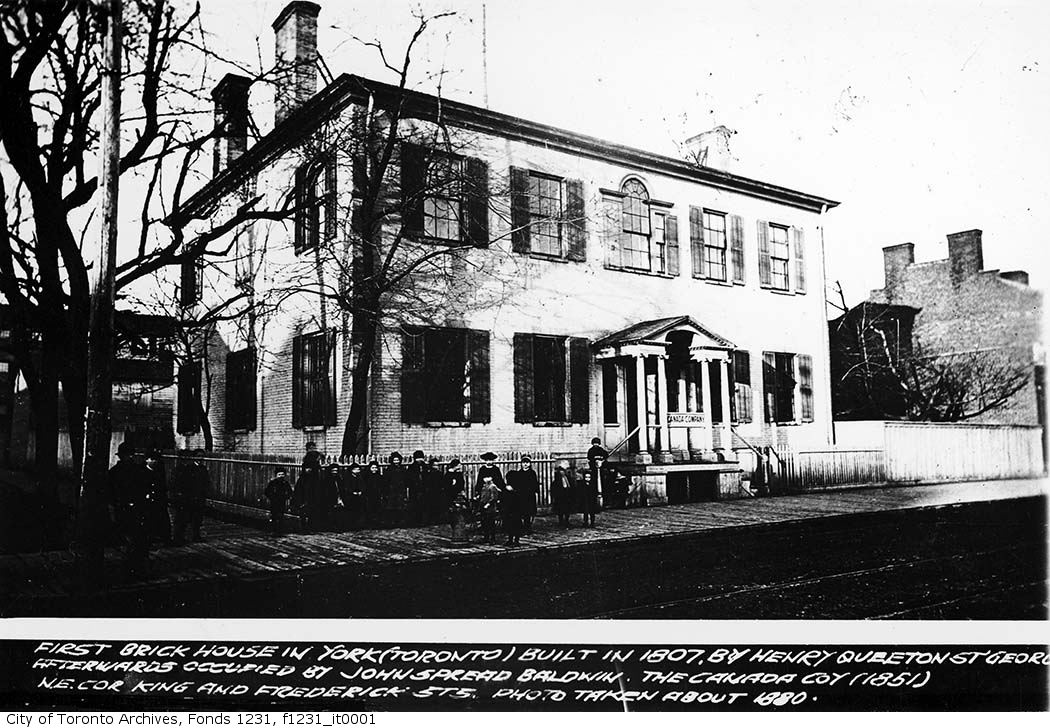
Quetton St. George house at King and Frederick streets, c. 1880

His home in York (at the northeast corner of King and Frederick streets) was designed by William Baldwin and built from 1807 to 1810. The house was the first brick residence in the town, and it was later owned by the Baldwin family before being demolished in 1901.

Despite working in the New World, his family returned to France, leaving him alone in Canada. In 1815, he travelled to France and England, and he remained in Europe until his death in 1821.

In 1819, he married Adèle de Barbeyrac in France, who gave birth to their son Henri. He previously had a son and daughter by Marguerite Vallière in Upper Canada.

== Henri Quetton de St. George ==
His son Henri Quetton de St. George (c. 1822–1896) was not born in Canada, but would arrive after his father's death to Canada and died in 1896 at Richmond Hill, Ontario. The younger Quetton would remain in Canada (other than a brief time in the brewing business at Oswego, New York), including the founding of Washago, Ontario, establishing a lumber business (Quetton St. George and Co.), and becoming a wine merchant in Toronto.

Quetton's wife and daughter would not remain in Canada. His daughter, Madeleine St. George, returned to France to work at an orphanage in Paris and died there in 1914, and his wife left for France without him. Quetton died in Canada in 1896 and is buried at Temperanceville United Church in Richmond Hill.

== Legacy ==
- St. George Street in Toronto is believed to be named for him, and St. George station as well as the University of Toronto's St. George campus are named after the street.
- Lake St. George is named for his son Henri, whose estate (built in the 1850s and burned down in 1908) was located next to the kettle lake.

== See also ==
- Chouannerie
- Joseph-Geneviève de Puisaye
