= Baldwin Village =

- Neighbourhood
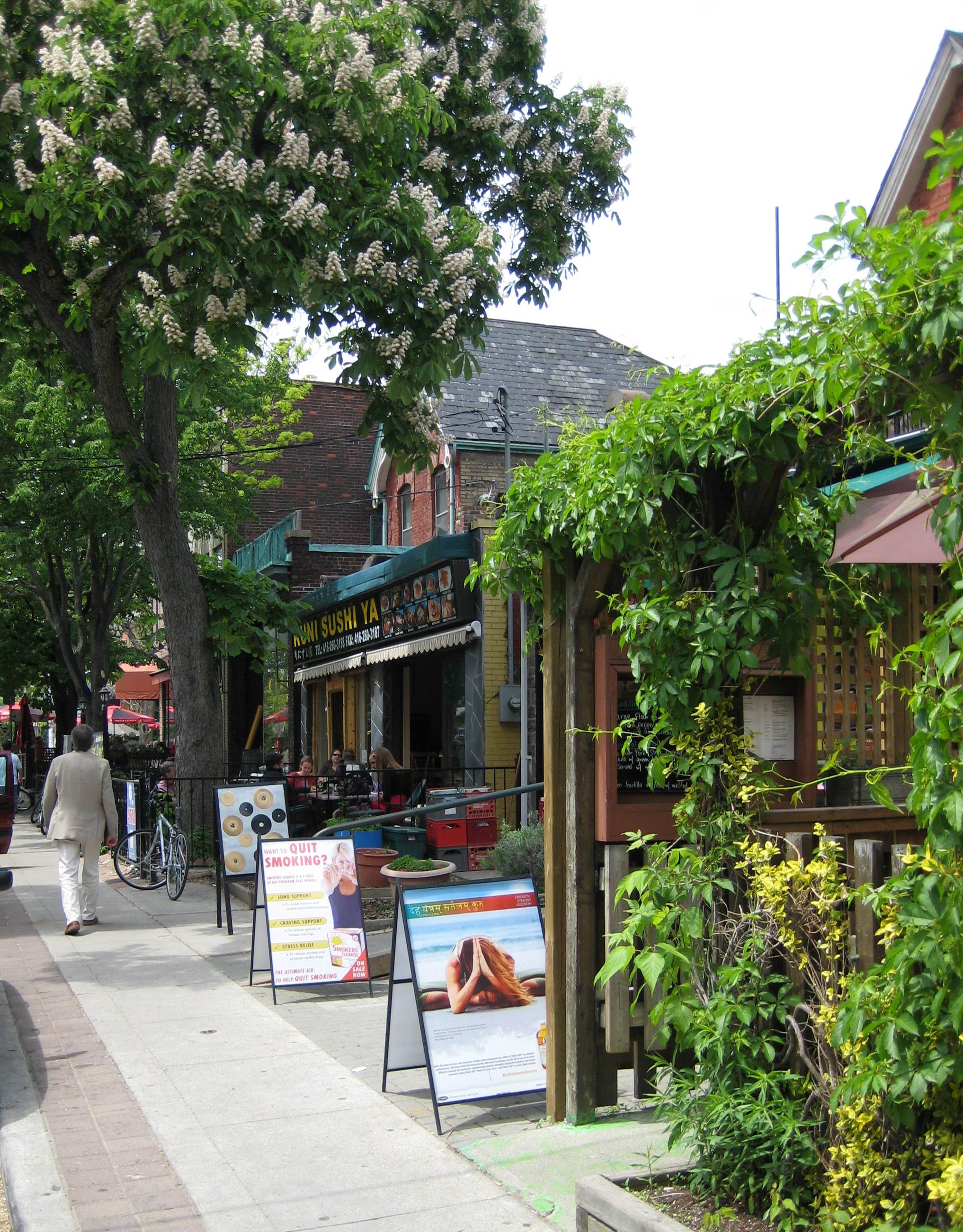
- Shops along Baldwin St

- Location within Toronto
- Coordinates: 43.656°N 79.3934°W
- Country: Canada
- Province: Ontario
- City: Toronto

Baldwin Village is a commercial enclave in Toronto, Ontario, Canada. It is located in the west of downtown Toronto, within the Grange Park neighbourhood, one block north of Dundas Street West, between Beverley and McCaul Streets. The former modestly sized homes on the street have been converted to restaurants and small shops selling arts, crafts and curios.

== History ==
The street was laid out and named after William Warren Baldwin, who owned much of the area, in the early nineteenth century. The neighbourhood developed in the early 20th century as the Jewish ghetto moved westward from its original location in The Ward towards what became the Kensington Market Jewish community, and the strip became home to a number of Jewish stores and restaurants. As the Jewish community moved north from downtown, the area's proximity to Chinatown led it to be populated by Chinese-Canadians. Also close to the University of Toronto and surrounded by the area known as the "Student Ghetto" it also became a centre for the 1960s youth movements. Most notably it was the central location for draft dodgers from the Vietnam War in Toronto. The draft dodgers converted a number of homes to shops catering to the new community. In 1978 the first cafe on the block opened, and since then the area has become one of the best known restaurant districts in Toronto. Mandel's Creamery at 29 Baldwin Street, the last remnant of the block's Jewish heritage, closed in 1995 after 90 years of operation, though the Yiddish lettering on its window has been preserved by the John's Italian Caffe, the neighbouring establishment at 27 Baldwin which expanded into the Mandel's former property. John's Italian Caffe, in turn, closed in 2014. An effort to preserve the window was launched by the Ontario Jewish Archives after the establishment was sold in 2015 to new owners who intend to open a Taiwanese style tea shop.

== Concerts ==
A series of street concerts and performances beginning with street closings in 2007, took place on July 15, August 19, and September 16th, following the Car Free Streets of Pedestrian Sundays.
