= The Grange (Toronto) =

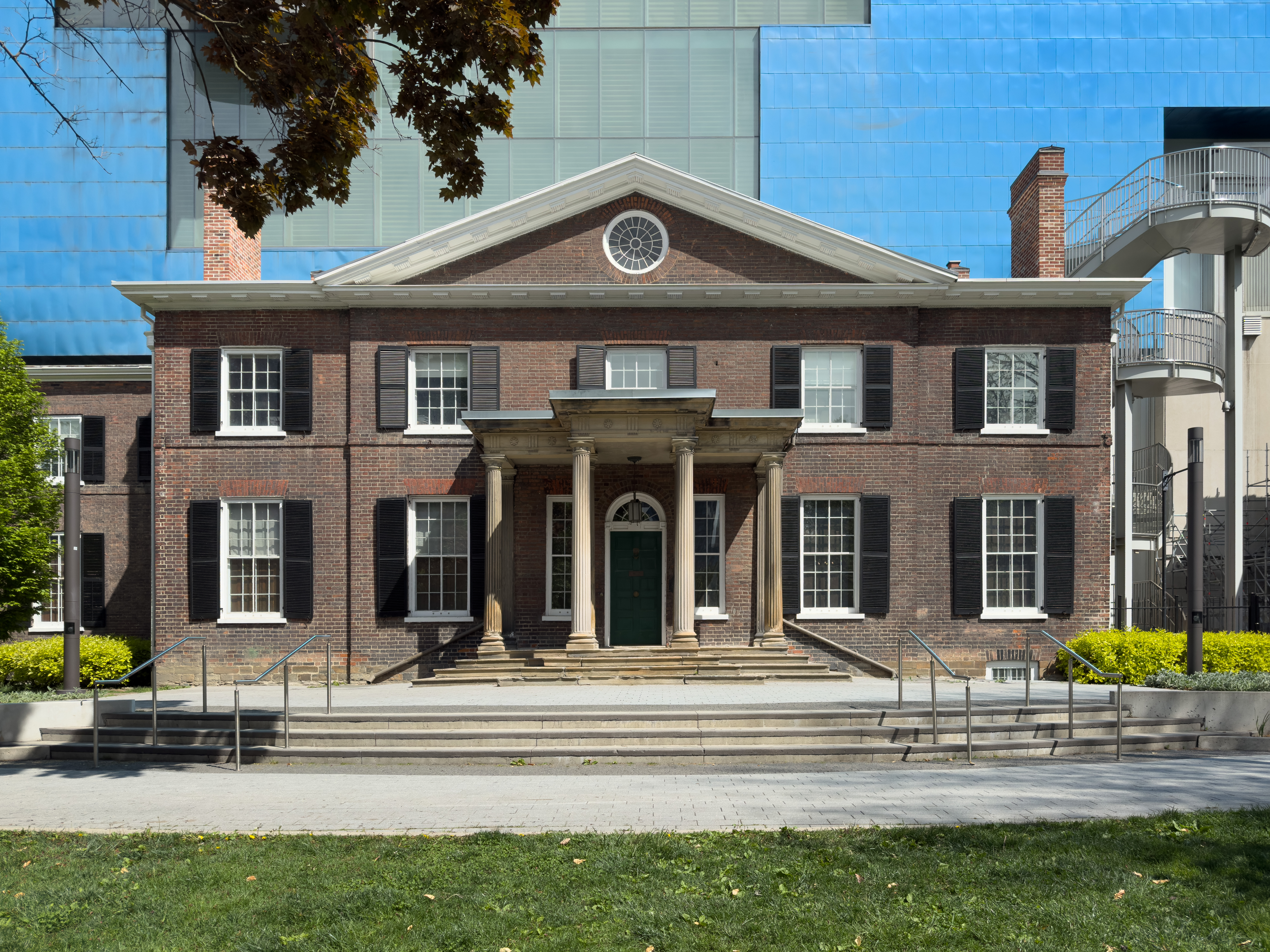
- The Grange in 2025
- Interactive map of The Grange
- 43°39′11″N 79°23′33″W
- Location: Toronto, Ontario

History
- Built: 1817
- Original use: Manor house

Site notes
- Current use: A wing of the Art Gallery of Ontario
- Governing body: Art Gallery of Ontario

National Historic Site of Canada
- Designated: 1970

The Grange is a historic Georgian manor in downtown Toronto, Ontario. It was the first home of the Art Museum of Toronto. Today, it is part of the Art Gallery of Ontario.

The structure was built in 1817, making it the 12th oldest surviving building in Toronto and the oldest remaining brick house. It was built for D'Arcy Boulton (1785–1846), a son of G. D'Arcy Boulton. He was one of the town's leading citizens and part of the powerful Boulton family, which played an important role in the Family Compact. Originally, it was considerably west of the town of York, but over time, the town grew and Boulton sold his considerable land holdings surrounding the manor for a large profit.

The house was inherited by D'Arcy's son and Toronto mayor, William Henry Boulton. When he died in 1874, the house passed to his widow, Hariette Boulton. She remarried the prominent scholar Goldwin Smith, and the couple lived in The Grange for the rest of their lives. Upon Goldwin's Smith's death in 1910, the couple bequeathed the building to the Art Museum of Toronto (now known as the Art Gallery of Ontario), and The Grange became the new home of the gallery. The building also served as the first home of the Ontario College of Art and Design, now OCAD University. Since the early 20th century, the Art Gallery of Ontario has been expanded a number of times, and the original manor makes up only a small part of the structure.

The expanse of lawn to the south of the building, what is left of the grounds, is operated by the city as Grange Park. Also on the old grounds is St. George Church, which was founded by the Boultons and which burned down in 1956. Only the tower and original Sunday school building remain.

In 1970, The Grange was designated a National Historic Site of Canada in recognition of the house's significance to the history of Toronto.

== History ==
=== Early history (1817–1910) ===
The Grange was built in 1817 as the home of D'Arcy Boulton (1785–1846; son of G. D'Arcy Boulton), his wife, Sarah Anne, and their eight children. It was located on 100 acres (40 ha) of land that extended from Queen Street in the south to Bloor Street in the north, and from Beverley Street east to McCaul Street. The north section of the property was sold to Bishop Strachan in 1828, to be used for the establishment of King's College, an Anglican university. Property to the south was donated in the 1830s and 1840s for St. George the Martyr Church and St. Patrick's Market, both still in existence.

Sarah Anne Robinson was born in Lower Canada in 1789 to a loyalist family who had previously moved north from Virginia after the American Revolution. D’Arcy Boulton, in contrast, immigrated to Canada in 1797 when he was 12 years old. The two met through Sara Anne's older brother Peter Robinson and settled at The Grange (so named for the Boulton family estate in Lincolnshire, England) in 1817.

Sarah Anne quickly established herself as a superior hostess and The Grange became a central site for the social and political happenings of early Toronto. Over the course of their lives, the Boultons had eight children. D’Arcy Boulton made his living running a dry good store and obtaining three governments posts. He died in 1846 after a rough decade of family deaths, a cholera epidemic and financial strain. When D’Arcy died, the house was left to Sarah Anne. She put the house and the land around it in trust for her daughter-in-law, Harriette, as a marriage settlement. Thus, the house was under Harriette's control and it was Harriette who bequeathed the house to the Art Museum of Toronto. The head of the household was now his eldest son, William Henry Boulton.

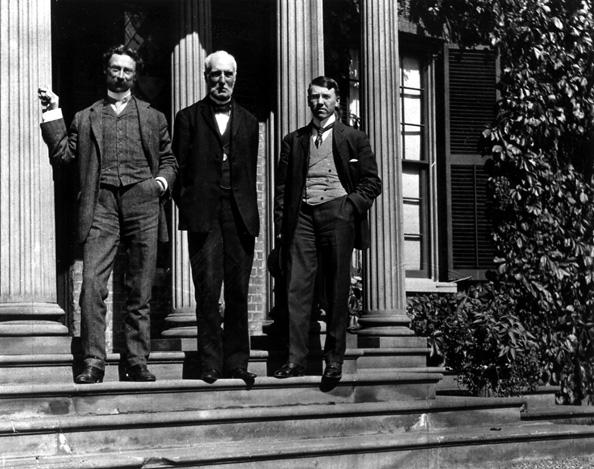
Goldwin Smith (centre foreground) at The Grange with friends. Smith lived on the property in the late 19th century

Over the course of his life William was mayor of Toronto three times in 1845, 1846, 1847 and was a member of the Legislative Assembly of the Province of Canada. In 1846, William married Harriette Mann Dixon from Boston, yet the couple never had any children. William, however, was fond of gambling and Harriette and her mother-in-law, Sarah Anne, spent much time trying to keep The Grange in Boulton hands. William died in 1874, leaving Harriette as the sole owner of The Grange.

In 1875, Harriette married Goldwin Smith, British scholar and political writer. Goldwin Smith was once regius professor of history at Oxford University and personal tutor to the Prince of Wales. However, he decided to settle in Toronto in 1871. Smith was a proud supporter of the arts in Toronto and founded journals and encouraged young artists to paint Canadian subjects. The couple lived happily in The Grange until their deaths in 1909 (Harriette) and 1910 (Goldwin).

=== Re-purposing into an art gallery (1911–present) ===
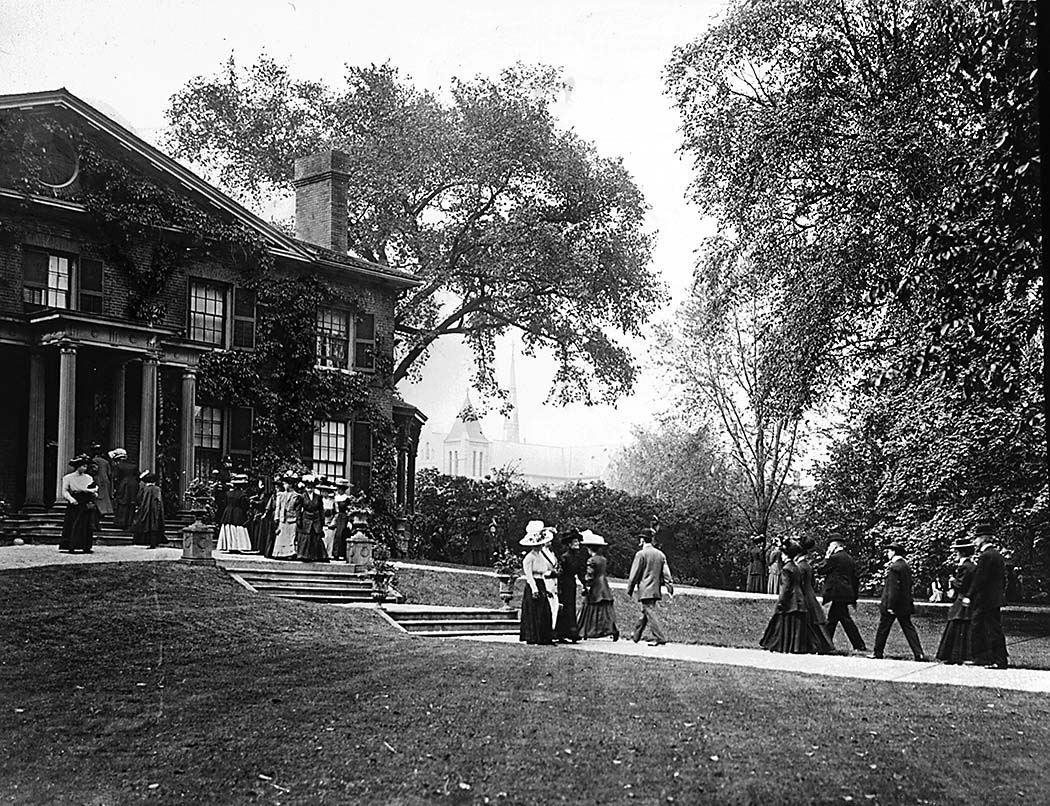
The Grange in 1910, shortly before it was transformed into an art museum

By the turn of the 20th century, it was decided that Toronto should have an art gallery, much like many other major cities at the time. By 1900, local artist George Reid was the president of the Ontario Society of Artists and was pushing for the creation of an art gallery. Between Reid and Edmund Walker (prominent banker and champion of the arts), a campaign was established to raise money for the gallery scheme. In 1902, the Smiths joined the cause and decided to bequeath The Grange as the first location of the Art Museum of Toronto. It wasn't until 1913 that the museum held its first exhibition, composed of Smith's own collection. By 1966, The Art Museum of Toronto was renamed the Art Gallery of Ontario (AGO) and The Grange now sits on the south side of the larger AGO building.

From the early days of the Art Museum of Toronto until the restoration of the 1960s, The Grange underwent a variety of changes, including electrification and the inclusion of an apartment for a live-in caretaker. In 1918 and 1926 respectively, additional gallery wings were added to the AGO and several rooms in The Grange were used as staff offices. A tea room was also established in the drawing room and breakfast parlour.

By the 1960s, the AGO was once again expanding, therefore forging a new path for The Grange. This was a time in Ontario of increased interest in heritage preservation and so the Junior Women's Committee raised $650 000 for a restoration project. This money was used to restore The Grange to how it would have looked in 1835. In 1970, The Grange was named a National Historic Site of Canada. Designated by the City of Toronto under the Ontario Heritage Act by By-law 130-91

Today, The Grange houses the Norma Ridley Members’ Lounge and exhibit spaces. While it is no longer furnished as a historic house depicting the 1830s, it retains its historic roots and architectural integrity. Visitors to the AGO are free to enjoy The Grange and explore the exhibits, take a tour, and speak to a volunteer about The Grange history.

== Architecture ==
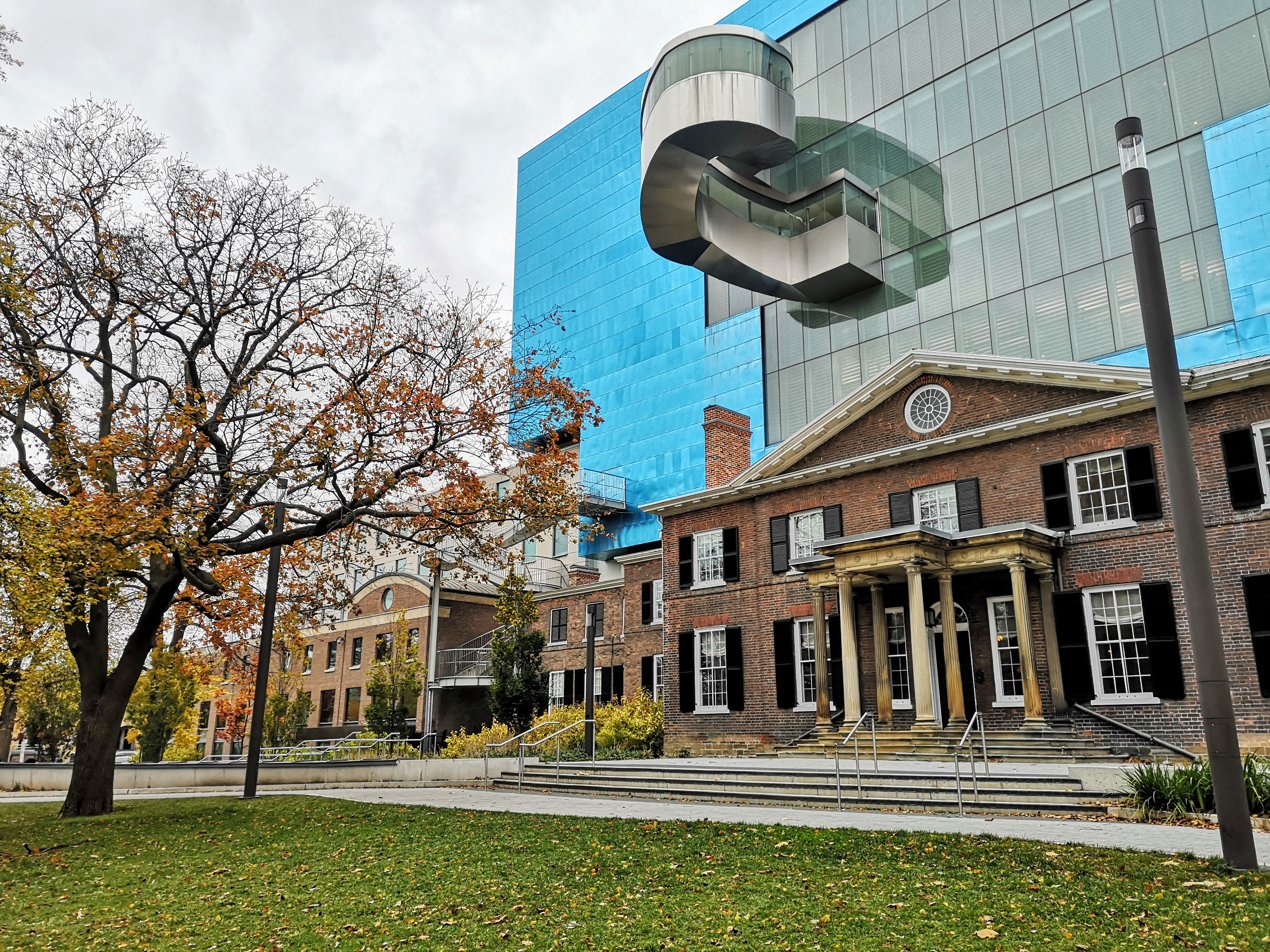
The Art Gallery of Ontario's five-storey main building situated behind The Grange, a two-storey Georgian-styled residence

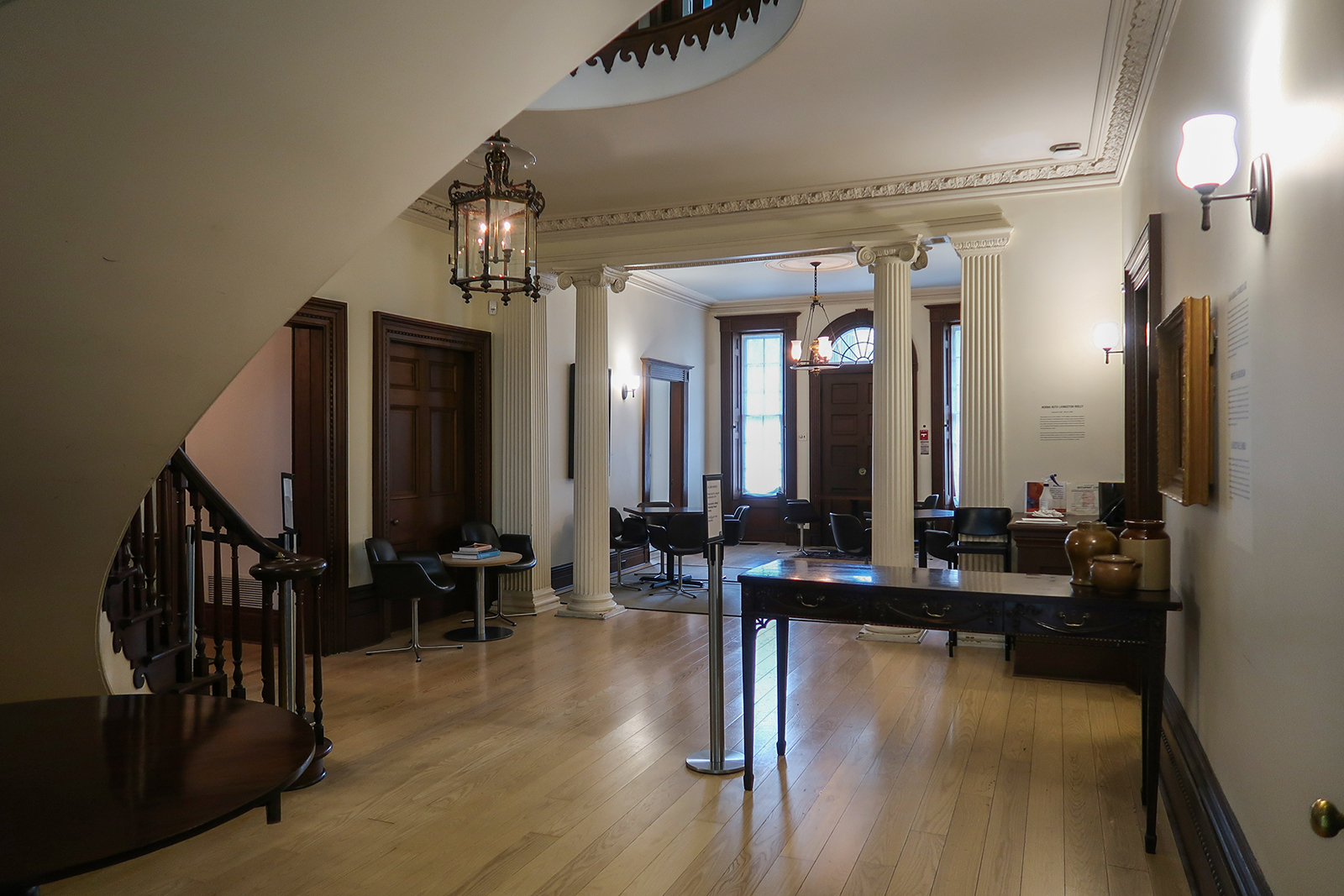
Norma Ridley Members' Lounge

The original house was two storeys high, 60 by 40 feet (18 m × 12 m) in area, with a low hipped roof containing a circular window. It is likely that the bricks were made on the property from the heavily clayed soil. Noting the absence of an architect of record, William Dendy and William Kilbourn speculated the mason in charge of bricklaying likely designed the layout in consultation with Boulton. The windows are double-hung with brick lintels and louvered wooden shutters. They are 12-over-12 sash on the main floor and 8-over-8 sash on the second. The front door has a moulded reveal and a semi-circular fanlight, with separate sidelights. Originally, the gate of the building extended to Queen Street, however the gates have been crowded back to the head of John Street. As was the custom at the time, The Grange was built in the middle of a hundred-acre park lot. It received the name "The Grange" after a family estate in England.

Reflecting a sense of Georgian balance, the front door opened onto a central hall with the dining room on the left and the drawing room on the right. At the back of the house and on the second floor were bedrooms for the family. There were also four large rooms in the attic, probably for the servants. The kitchen, food storage areas and scullery were in the basement.

The property saw two major expansions, with the first series of expansions occurring in the 1840s. Several additions were made to the house, possibly because there had been a fire (this is difficult to confirm). These changes included the enlargement of the drawing room; the elimination of three bedrooms to create a large second-floor assembly room; and an addition on the west end to house an office. William Boulton, who was mayor of Toronto four times and a Member of Parliament, might have needed such a space. The front hall was also enlarged and a new central staircase installed. The painted glass window depicting the family crest was also added. This crest is a visual play on the name Boulton, as it shows a barrel pierced by an arrow, or bolt, with a hogshead of wine or tun. The family motto — "Dux vitae ratio" ("The guide to life is reason") — rests below the crest, always reminding the Boultons of their British ancestry. William, the secretary of the Turf Club, built St. Leger Race Course to the north.

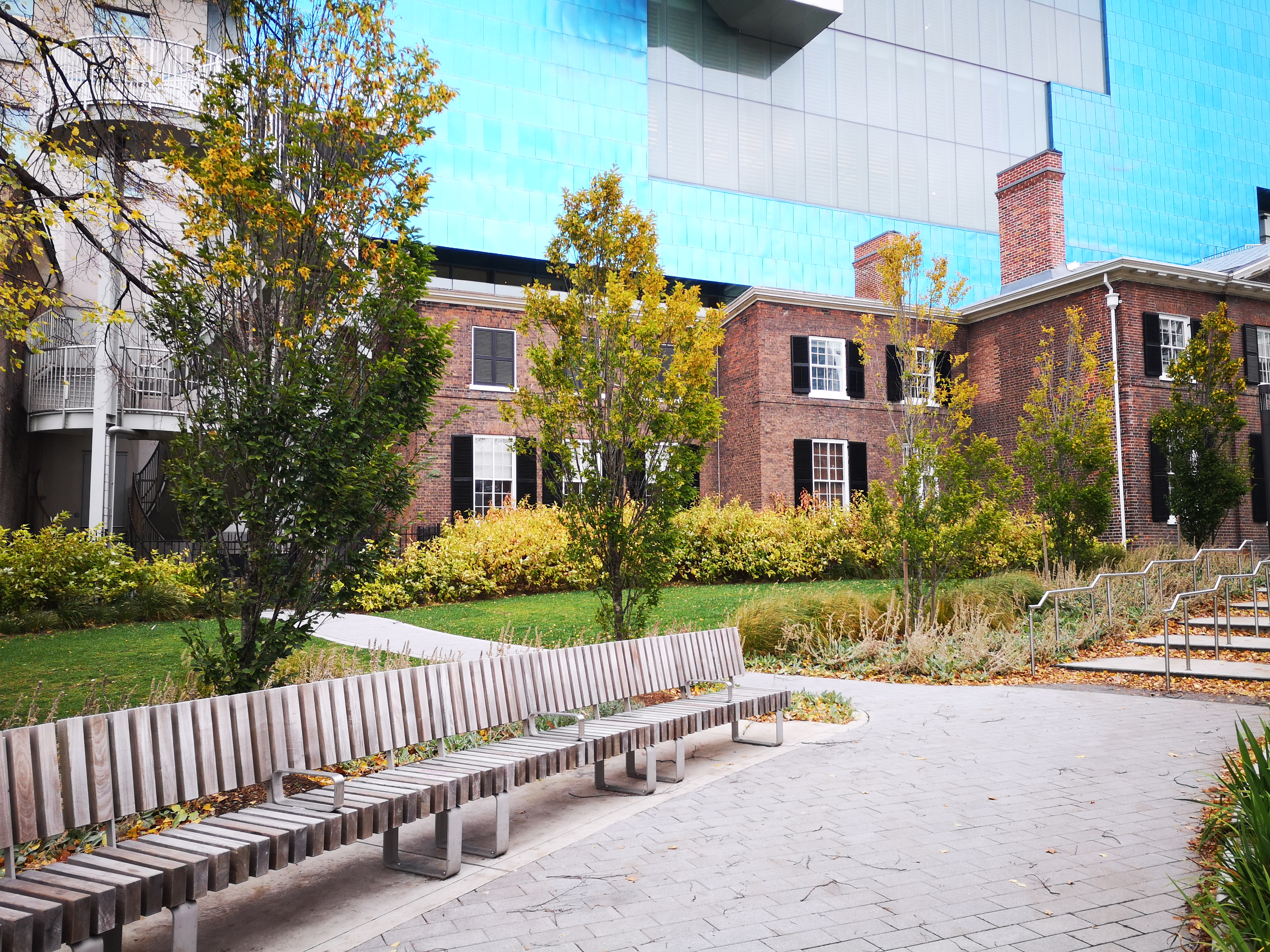
The west wings of The Grange were built in the 1840s and 1885

Following the marriage of Harriette Boulton to her second husband, Goldwin Smith, the property was expanded again. Smith was a scholar and a study was added to the west of the house in 1843. Further changes were made in 1885, overseen by Walter Strickland. the Georgian-style staircase was replaced with an angular Victorian-style oak stair that skirted the painted window. The wooden front porch was replaced with a stone version.

=== Gardens ===
Originally, there was a path running up to the front steps, with an oval drive around the front lawn. The house stood on raised ground with terraces, as it does today. Around it was a mix of open spaces, stands of trees and flower gardens. Behind the house were vegetable and fruit gardens and, farther north, an orchard. The front lawn of The Grange, now known as the Grange Park, was central to Grange activities. This was the site for many garden parties, church school picnics and even a royal visit. The Grange itself is a terminating vista for John Street to the lake and the gardens would've reflected that.

Several images of The Grange show a domed glass conservatory on the east side of the house, which would have been filled with plants readily available from catalogues. One 1827 catalogue advertised 79 varieties of apple among other fruit and ornamental trees, as well as a wide variety of shrubs, flowers and greenhouse plants. We know that there was an orchard house on the property growing peaches, nectarines and grapes. William Boulton won prizes at the 1844 Toronto Horticultural Society Show for geraniums, roses, greenhouse plants and pansies. The gardener, John Gray, named a geranium he developed Pelargonium boultonianum after the Boultons.

With the sale of the southern part of the property in the mid-19th century, a new entrance to The Grange was created, which included a lodge — home to William Chin, the butler, and his family. Other buildings included a stable, a root house, a tool house and a drive shed. Later in the century, cottages for married servants were also erected.
