= MSDS Studio =

MSDS ("make shit, design shit") Studio is a Toronto-based design studio founded by Jessica Nakanishi and Jonathan Sabine in 2011. They focus on furniture, lighting, and interior design. Nakanishi's and Sabine's collaboration comes from Nakanishi's experience in interior design, and Sabine's background in making furniture. Their style has been described as a mixture of Japanese minimalism and Scandinavian simplicity. Toronto Life called them one of "Toronto’s best architects and designers right now".

== Collaborations ==
MSDS Studio designed interiors for Toronto businesses Shopify, and SPiN Toronto. They designed housewares for Umbra Shift.

== Awards ==
They received the Juror's Choice Award at the 2013 Toronto Design Offsite Festival.

Azure named them "Canadian product designers of the year" in 2017 as well as featuring them in their "30 Canadian Product Designers Leading the Charge".

They became the first Canadian studio to be featured at the Stockholm Furniture & Light Fair in 2015. At the Stockholm Furniture Fair, MSDS presented their new range of furniture.
