= Toronto Design Week =

Events and exhibitions hosted by DESIGN TO in Toronto

Toronto Design Week is the unofficial name of the events and exhibitions hosted by DesignTO, formerly known as the Toronto Design Offsite Festival. It is a design showcase in Toronto, Ontario, Canada, where numerous design exhibitions take place over a period of approximately one week towards the end of January.

== DesignTO (formerly Toronto Design Offsite Festival) ==
Concurrently, the annual not-for-profit Toronto Design Offsite Festival (DesignTO) hosts over 100 design-related exhibitions, events, talks, and workshops at various venues across Toronto, including the TO DO Festival Symposium, the Interior Design Show, Outside the Box, Living Well, TO DO Festival Party, Gladstone Hotel's Come Up To My Room, an established annual alternative showcase for local design in its own right. Schools with design programs, including OCAD University, Ryerson University, Sheridan College, and George Brown College also organize student exhibitions during the Festival.

== Interior Design Show ==
The biggest self-produced event during the festival is the annual Interior Design Show with over 50,000 visitors, the largest consumer fair of its kind in Canada.
