= Atlason =

Atlason is a surname. Notable people with the surname include:

- Arnór Atlason (born 1984), Icelandic handball player
- Emil Atlason (born 1993), Icelandic football player
- Hlynur Atlason (born 1974), Icelandic industrial designer
- Jóhannes Atlason (born 1944), Icelandic football player and manager
