= Richard West Houses =

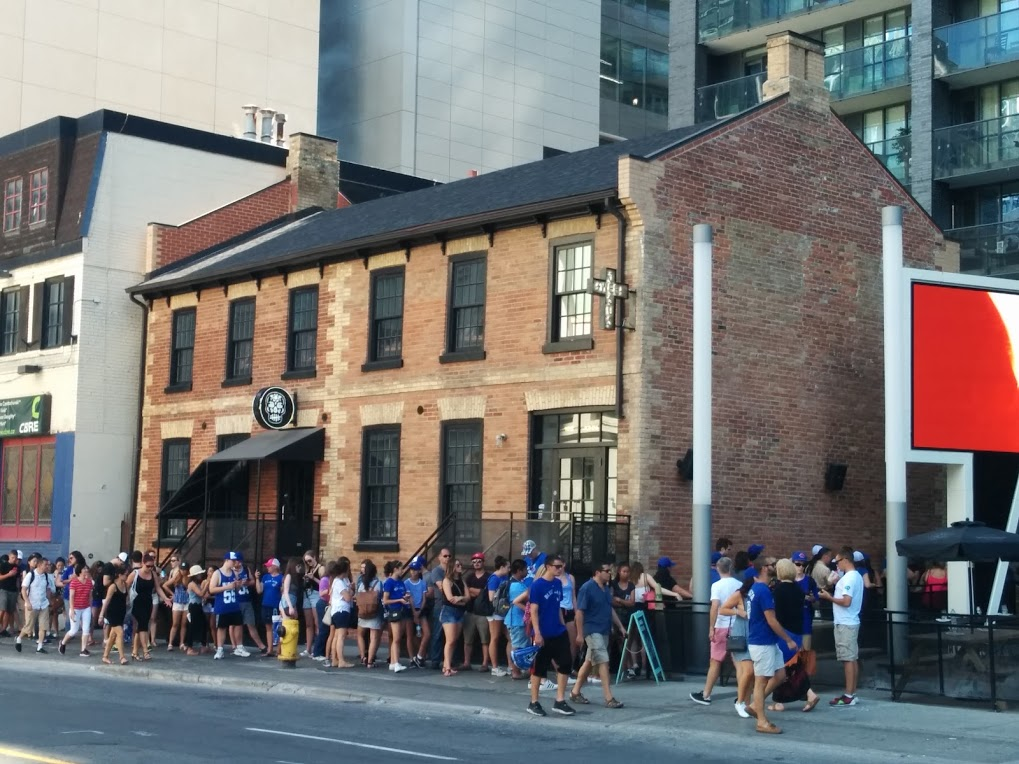
- The Richard West Houses in 2016.
- Interactive map of Richard West Houses
- Location: 104 John Street; Toronto, Ontario, Canada
- Coordinates: 43°38′49.9″N 79°23′24.5″W
- Built: 1869

Ontario Heritage Act
- Designated: May 12, 2010
- Designated by: Toronto City Council

The Richard West Houses are a group of row houses in Toronto, Ontario, Canada, located at 104 John Street in downtown Toronto. Built in 1869, the structure was included in the City of Toronto's Heritage Property Inventory in 2005 and designated a heritage building under the Ontario Heritage Act in 2010.

Among other features, the houses are noted for their dichromatic (two-colour) brickwork, a hallmark of Gothic Revival architecture. Imported from Britain and prominent in the work of English architect William Butterfield, dichromatic brickwork was common in 19th-century Canadian architecture.

The homes are named for Richard West (born 1834), who immigrated to North America from County Fermanagh, on the island of Ireland, in 1855. West spent time in New York City, Jersey City, and Long Island, before moving to Toronto around 1856. A contractor, West ultimately acquired significant property holdings in Toronto. By the 1890s, he owned 85 houses and numerous other lots.

The houses were deemed heritage properties based on the scale, form and detail work that the buildings possess. The detailing and cladding are unique for the time period. The houses are examples of buildings that were originally designated for residential use that still remain to this day. The Gothic Revival style is one that is often not used in present-day residential design.

The home and plot of land was purchased by a developer in order to redevelop the land into a high rise condominium building. In order to do so, the home was moved in August 2011 from the south-west corner of Adelaide and John Streets further south on John to accommodate the initial site excavation. The houses formerly housed "The Fox and Fiddle" pub and were repurposed into the "Sweet Jesus" cafe and ice cream shop after the move.

== See also ==
- List of oldest buildings and structures in Toronto
