= John Street (Toronto) =

Street in Toronto, Ontario, Canada

Coordinates: 43°38′52″N 79°23′25″W

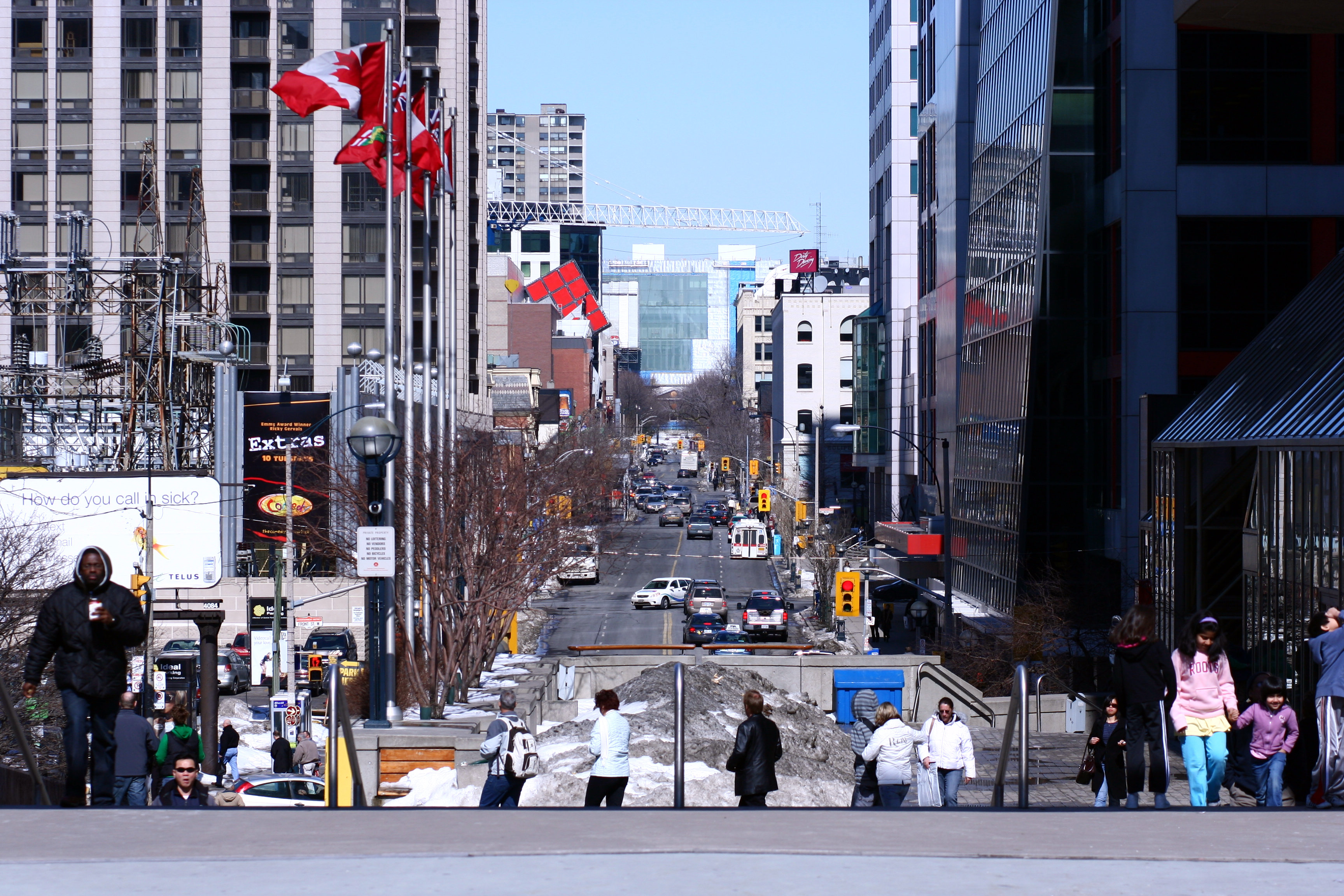
- John Street running from the Rogers Centre to the Art Gallery of Ontario
- Interactive map of John Street
- Location: Toronto
- North end: Stephanie St
- South end: Front St W

Other
Nearby arterial roads in Toronto
← Spadina Avenue	University Avenue →

John Street is a street in Downtown Toronto. It runs from Stephanie Street and Grange Park in the north to the Metro Toronto Convention Centre on Front Street in the south. It is home to a number of Toronto's cultural institutions, including buildings for the Canadian Broadcasting Corporation (CBC), CTV, and Toronto International Film Festival. The National Post has described it as "Running directly through the entertainment district, its spine connects many great cultural institutions, popular retail outlets, restaurants and soon-to-be-built condos." The City of Toronto has dubbed the street a "Cultural Corridor" and a report calls it "the centrepiece of the Entertainment District."

== History ==
John Street, and other streets in the area, were named after John Graves Simcoe, the founder of York (today Toronto) and the first Lieutenant Governor of Upper Canada.

During the typhus epidemic of 1847, 863 Irish immigrants died of typhus in fever sheds at the Toronto Hospital on the northwest corner of King Street and John Street.

== Route description ==
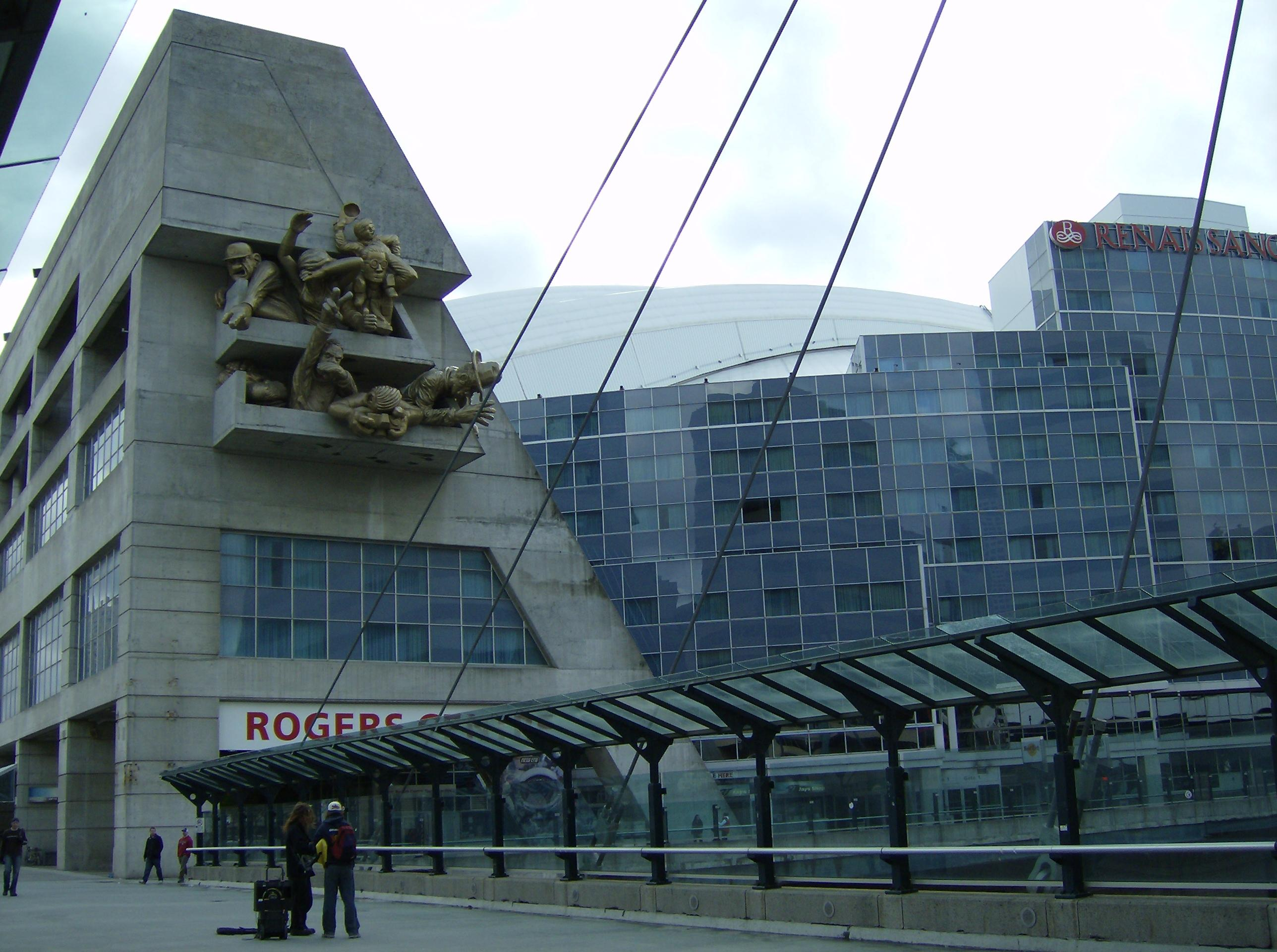
John Street Bridge, which is a pedestrian cable-stayed bridge over the railway tracks, linking the foot of the street to the Rogers Centre stadium

John Street begins at Front Street. Just to the south is the Rogers Centre and CN Tower, located on the former railway lands. John Street formerly extended further south over the railway tracks to Lake Shore Boulevard. Today, a pedestrian mall begins at the terminus of John Street, connecting it to these structures and to Bremner Boulevard via a pedestrian cable-stayed bridge over the railway tracks. South of Bremner Boulevard, what was formerly John Street has since been designated Rees Street. The John Street Roundhouse and John Street Pumping Station retain their original names, despite no longer being on John Street.

From Front Street to Queen Street West, John Street is a four-lane road. Once an industrial area, the street has since been lined by a series of office buildings and condominiums that have been built since the 1980s. In the 1990s, downtown expended westward as the first office towers were built along John. These include Canadian Broadcasting Centre—headquarters of the CBC—and Metro Hall, the former headquarters of Metro Toronto. In the 2000s, condominiums began to be built throughout the Entertainment District, and the southern part of John Street has since been lined with many condominium towers.

North of Adelaide Street, John narrows to three lanes and changes in character, becoming one of the central nodes of the entertainment district. The street in this section is mostly lined with low rise commercial buildings. These include a number of restaurants, the Scotiabank Theatre, a bowling alley, CTV Queen Street, the National Film Board of Canada Mediatheque, and the former location of the Circa nightclub, once the largest of the clubs in the entertainment district.

North of Queen Street, John Street narrows further to two lanes. The northernmost section of the street is mostly residential, lined with a series of mid-rise apartment buildings and condominiums, mostly dating from middle of the 20th century. John Street reaches its northern terminus at Grange Park, which gives its name to the Grange Park neighbourhood. A path through the park follows the Axis of John Street, leading to The Grange, a heritage manor. The manor is now attached to the Art Gallery of Ontario and OCAD University is also adjacent to the park.

== Future ==
The Globe and Mail described John Street's current character as "a largely utilitarian stretch of broken pavement, parking lots, chain restaurants and media company headquarters." Plans are underway to turn John Street into the hub of Toronto's Entertainment District by widening the sidewalks and creating a tree-lined boulevard that would serve as a central access to the neighbourhood. In places where John Street has four lanes, it will be reduced to two to make more room for sidewalks and trees. The plan was developed by the local Business Improvement Association and the City of Toronto government and is the current top planning priority for the Entertainment District.

== Landmarks ==
Landmark	Cross street	Notes	Image
Metro Toronto Convention Centre	Front Street		
Canadian Broadcasting Centre	Front Street	CBC headquarters	
Metro Hall	Wellington Street		
Princess of Wales Theatre	King Street		
Bell Lightbox	King Street	Headquarters of TIFF	
Richard West Houses	Adelaide	1869 houses	
Scotiabank Theatre Toronto	Richmond St		
CTV Queen Street	Queen St W	Former CityTV headquarters	
Umbra Concept Store; 165 John Street	Queen St W	Umbra design company flagship store	
St. George - the - Martyr Anglican Church	Stephanie St		
Grange Park	Stephanie St		

== See also ==
- Weston, Ontario, a historic community in Toronto, also has a street named John Street
