= Grange Park (Toronto) =

Park in Toronto, Ontario, Canada

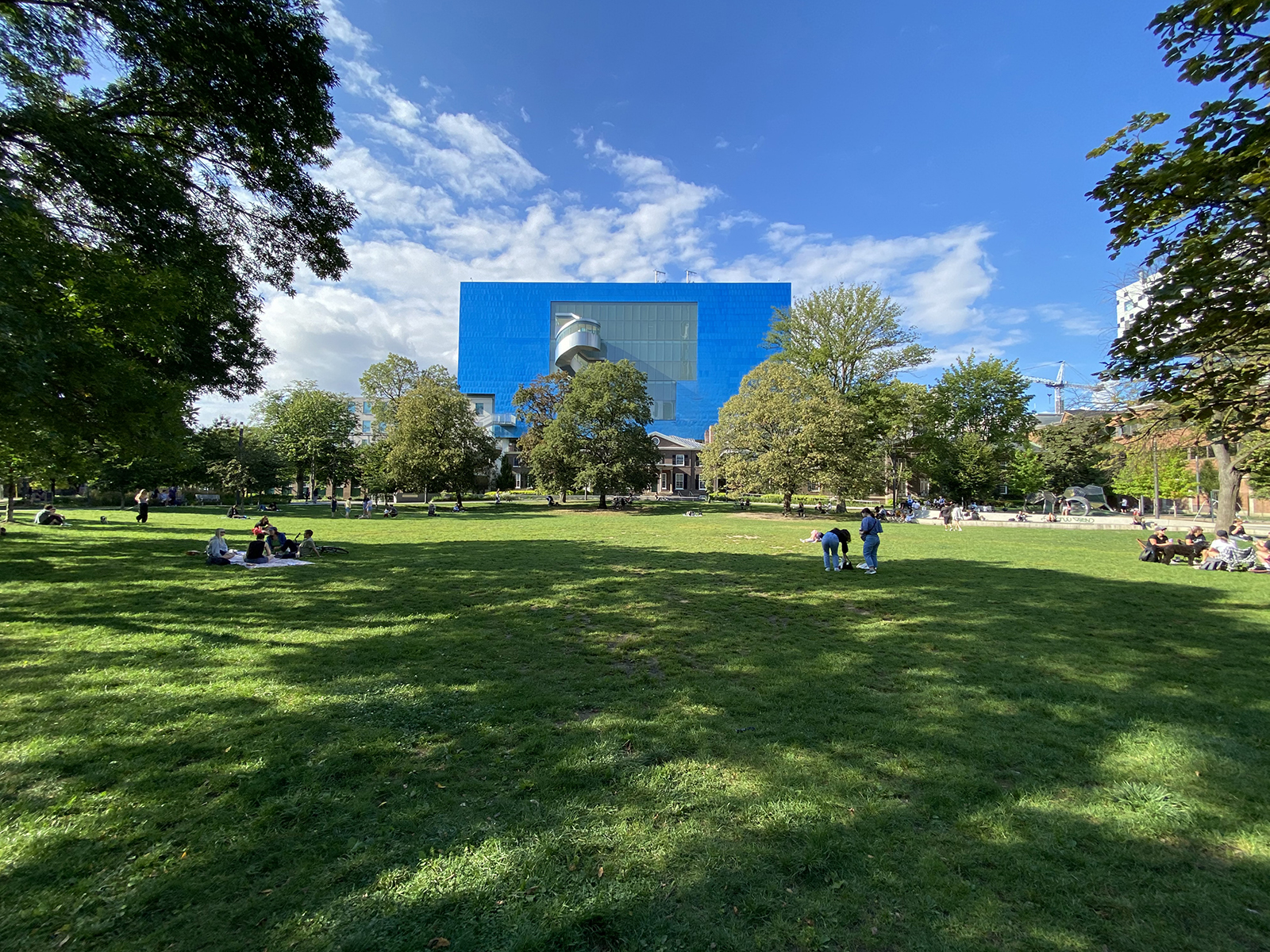
- Grange Park lawn area

- Location within Toronto
- Type: Municipal park
- Location: Toronto, Ontario, Canada
- Coordinates: 43°39′08″N 79°23′32″W
- Area: 1.8 hectare
- Created: 1911
- Owner: Art Gallery of Ontario
- Operator: Toronto Parks, Forestry and Recreation Division

Grange Park is a prominent and well-used public park in downtown Toronto, Ontario in Canada. It is located south of the Art Gallery of Ontario, next to the Ontario College of Art and Design University (OCADU) and north of University Settlement House, at the north end of John Street. The park lends its name to the Grange Park neighbourhood in the vicinity of the park. Historically, the park was the backyard of The Grange, a manor that was later expanded and became the Art Gallery of Ontario.

== Features ==
After a major renovation completed by July 2017, the park includes the following features:

- Henry Moore sculpture Large Two Forms, originally located next to the Art Gallery of Ontario at the corner of Dundas and McCaul streets.
- Weston family fountain.
- Splash pad and surrounding seating.
- Playground facilities geared to age with smaller, softer structures for younger children and taller structures for older children.
- A carriage path leading from John Street and circling the park.
- An off-leash area for dogs.
- Public washrooms.

There are a few prominently visible buildings along the borders of the park that act as a backdrop. These include:

- Art Gallery of Ontario - on the north side of the park
- The Grange - on the north side of the park
- Sharp Centre for Design, OCAD University - on the east side of the park
- Ruins of St George the Martyr Church (now St. George's Grange Park) - at the John Street entrance to the park
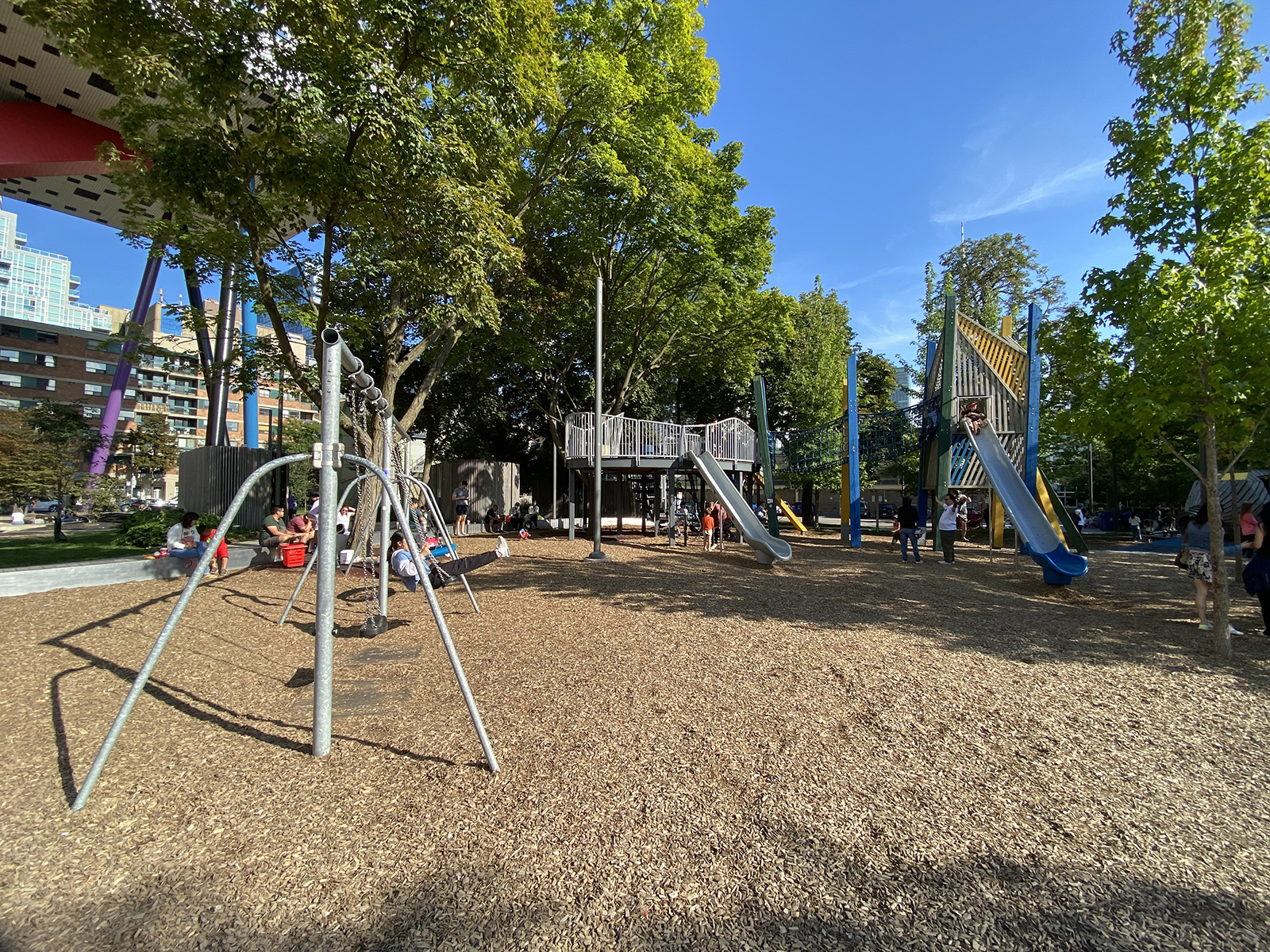
Children Playground

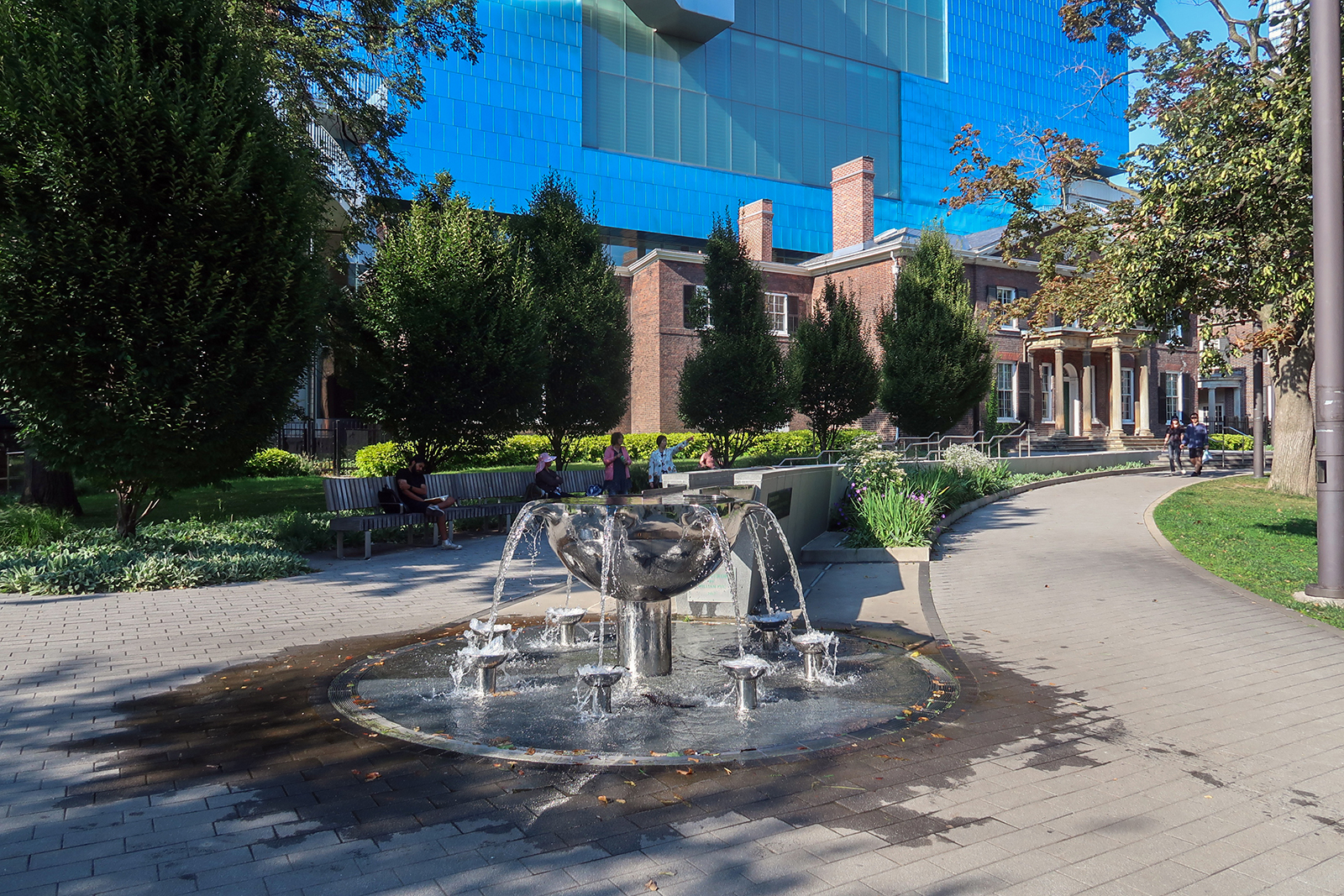
Weston family fountain

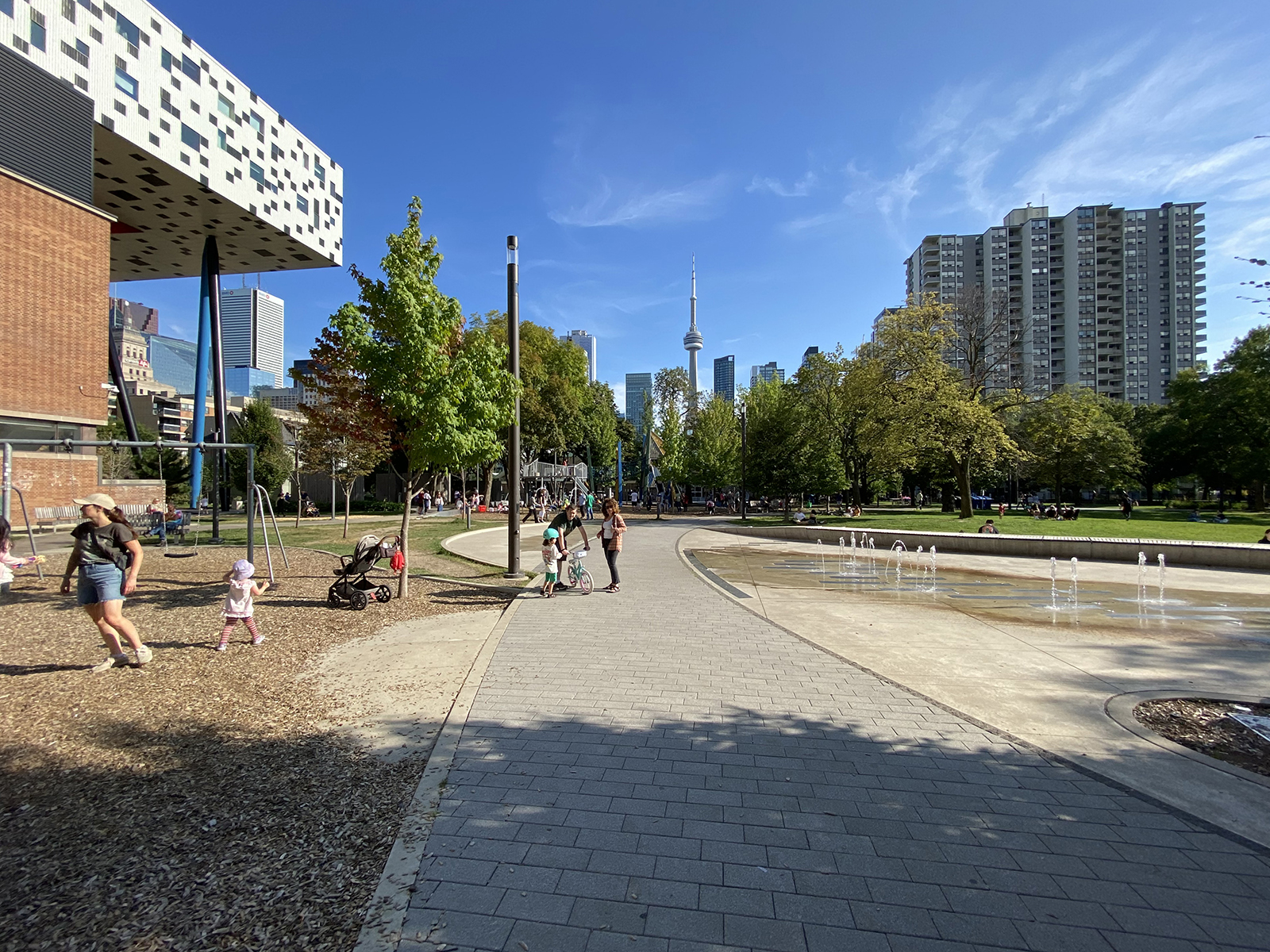
Splash Pad

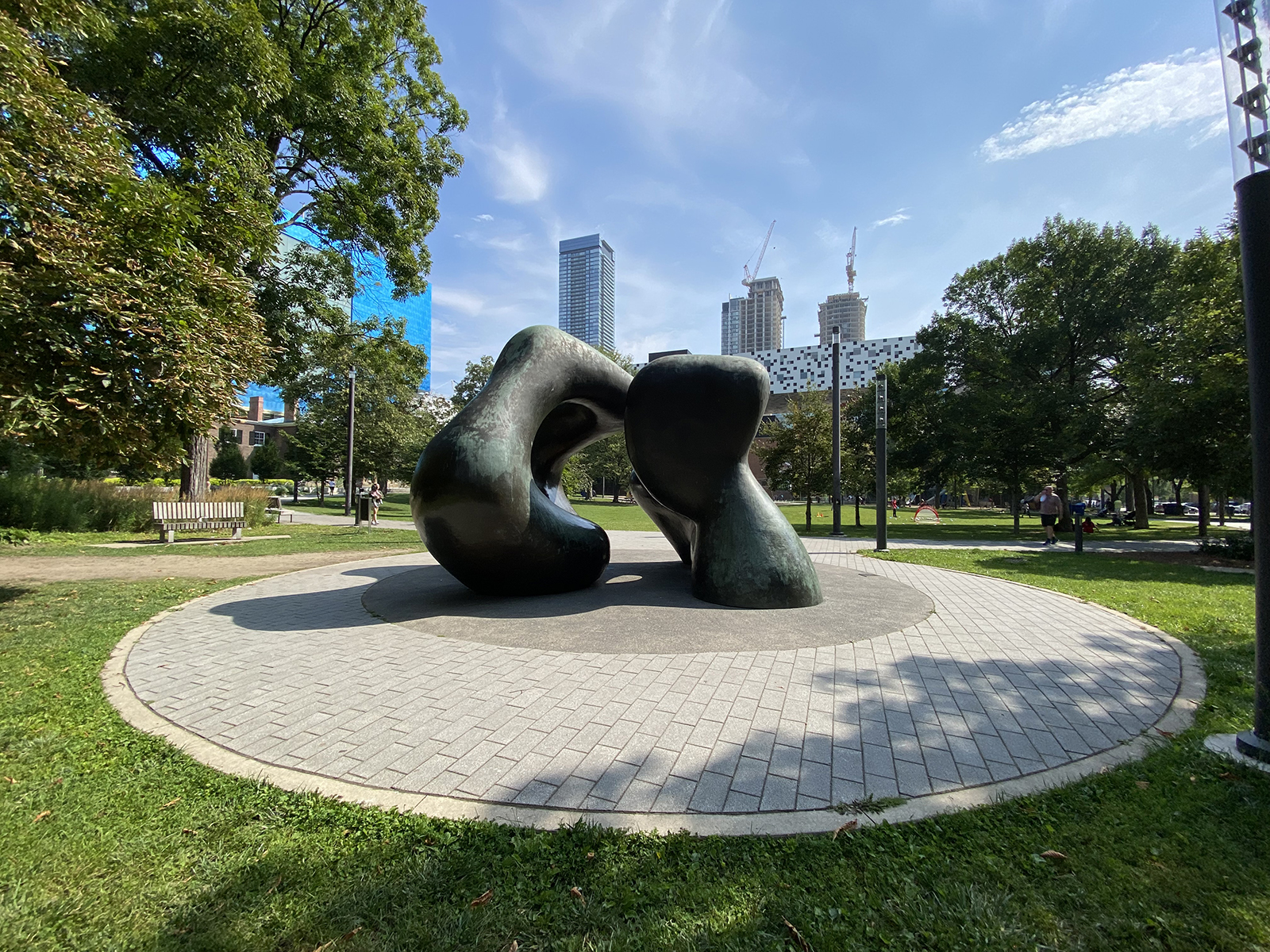
Henry Moore's Large Two Forms

== History ==
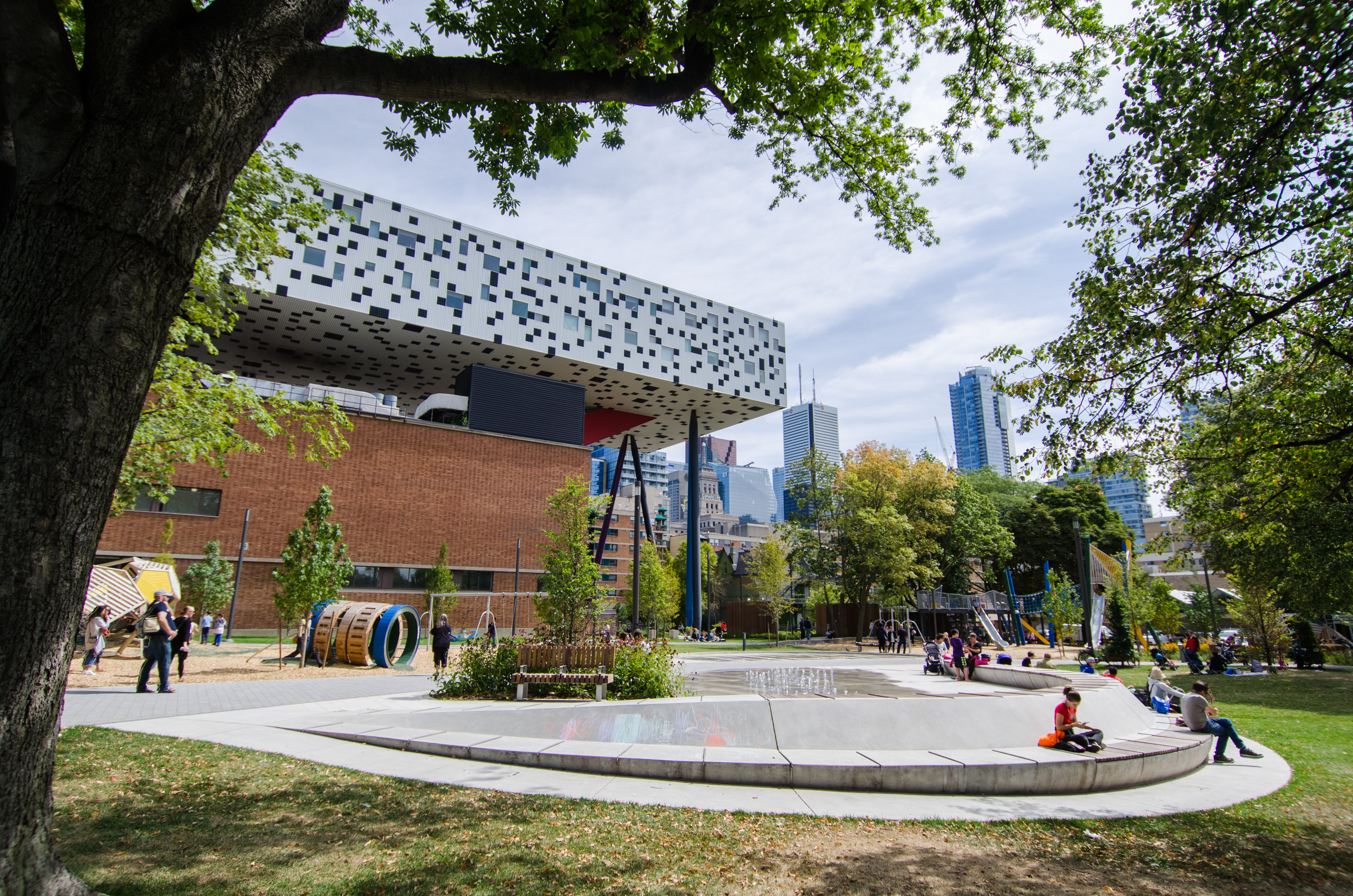
Grange Park after renovation in 2017

Grange Park was originally the front lawn and garden of the Grange, a manor house built in 1820 by the Boulton family, an influential family in 19th century Toronto. In 1910, Harriet Boulton (also known as Mrs. Goldwin Smith) bequeathed her estate to the Art Museum of Toronto (later the Art Gallery of Ontario), which included the Grange, and the surrounding property. On January 20, 1911, the Art Museum of Toronto reached an agreement with the City of Toronto, which would maintain the grounds south of The Grange as a municipal public park. The agreement continues to be in force, with the art museum remaining as the property's owner and the Toronto Parks, Forestry and Recreation Division maintaining the grounds as a municipal park.

In the mid-1970s, Grange Park was expanded to its present-day size by closing portions of two streets: Grange Road from Beverley Street to John Street and John Street between Grange Road to Stephanie Street.

In 2008, the Grange Park Advisory Committee (GPAC) was formed to join local residents, the Art Gallery of Ontario, the City of Toronto, and neighbouring organizations to start the Grange Park Revitalization Project with the goal of renovating Grange Park and restoring it to its natural beauty. By 2009, the GPAC had produced a design brief. The GPAC is a 15-person Committee whose role is to advise on the restoration and revitalization of Grange Park and on an oversight structure for the ongoing maintenance and program for Grange Park. By then, Grange Park had deteriorated because of restrictions in City funding resulting in uneven pathways, dilapidated benches and playground equipment, many areas of bare ground, and poorly maintained trees.

On July 10, 2017, after a cost of $15 million and construction lasting 15 months, a renovated Grange Park officially reopened with many improvements such as expansion of the children's play area, 80 new trees, expanded lawn area, an off-leash dog area, new public washrooms, new water features, and new seating areas. As part of the renovation, the Henry Moore sculpture Large Two Forms was moved from the corner of Dundas and McCaul Streets to become the centrepiece of the park. The park renovation was designed by PFS Studio with Thinc Design as executive architects. The AGO, the City of Toronto, the Weston Family, and various community groups jointly financed the renovation. There is also an endowment fund to support the park's long-term maintenance.

In February 2017, the Grange Community Association requested for the portion of John Street from Queen Street West to Stephanie Street to be given the ceremonial name of "Harriet Boulton Smith Way" in honour of the person who bequeathed the Grange estate to become Grange Park and the Art Gallery of Ontario. That portion of John Street had once been part of the Grange estate.
