= Umbra (housewares company) =

Toronto-based housewares company

Coordinates: 43.6505°N 79.3910°W

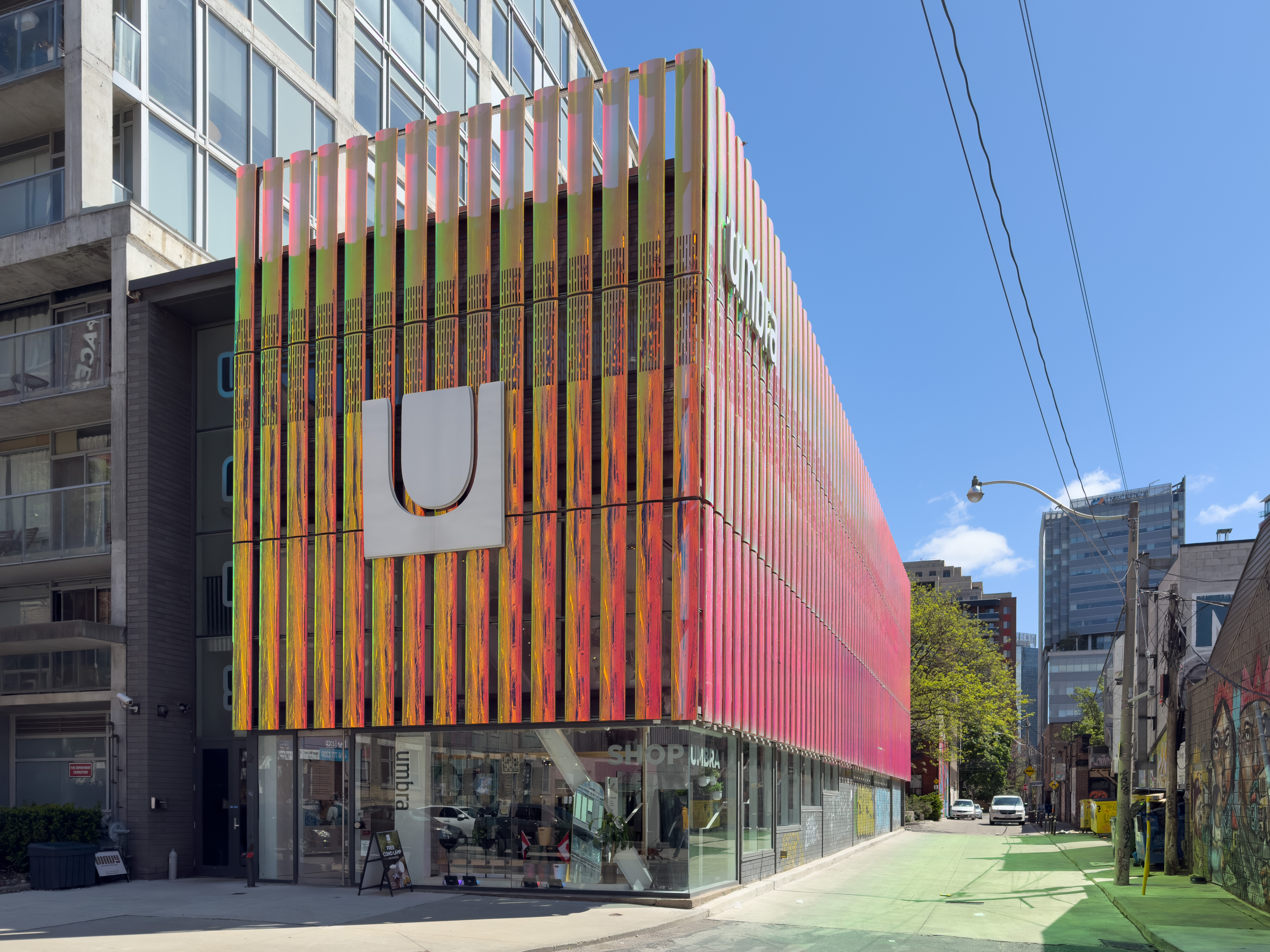
- Umbra Concept Store in downtown Toronto
- Company type: Private
- Founded: 1979
- Founder: Paul Rowan and Les Mandelbaum
- Headquarters: Toronto, Ontario, Canada
- Products: Housewares
- Website: umbra.com

Umbra is a home accessories design and manufacturing company. The company has headquarters in Toronto, Ontario, Canada and satellite offices in the Netherlands, Brazil, the United States, and China. The firm sells more than 2,000 home products through over 25,000 retailers in 120 countries.

== History ==
The firm was founded in 1978 by childhood friends Les Mandelbaum and Paul Rowan. The firm opened its first store in Toronto's Queen West District in 2007. Production is mainly done in China. It has retail stores in the United Kingdom, Luxembourg, China, Israel, Turkey, the United Arab Emirates, Mexico, Hong Kong, South Korea, Japan, the Philippines, Malaysia, and Singapore, and the Umbra and Umbra Shift e-commerce websites. Umbra products are also sold through other retailers.

== Umbra Concept Store ==
The Umbra Store is located north of Queen Street West at 165 John Street within the downtown core of Toronto, Ontario, Canada.

The building was constructed for the Umbra design company in 2007 to a design by Kohn Shnier Architects. The building has translucent bright pink vertical bands that wrap a glass structure positioned on the corner of a side street, surrounded by monotone brick construction. In comparison to the surrounding architecture the building is considerably smaller. The building is three stories tall. The overall axis of the structure is predominantly vertical with a centralized plan. The building in plan is a rectangle with a smaller rectangle offset to the middle that is positioned off center towards the main elevation.

=== Awards ===
- 2008 Retail Store Design Award by the Retail Council of Canada.

== Designs ==
Umbra has an in-house design team headed by Matt Carr, consisting of over 30 designers in Canada and abroad. Many independent designers have also collaborated with the firm. Notable ones who have made significant contributions to Umbra include Karim Rashid, Hlynur Atlason, and Harry Allen.

In 1996, Umbra teamed up with Rashid to create what would become one of the company’s most well-known products; the GARBO trash can. The wastebasket was named after actress Greta Garbo, mimicking the shape of her body. It sold more than two million units within the first two years of production and continues to sell today in a miniature version, GARBINO. It was donated to the Brooklyn Museum in 1999 and added into the permanent collection at the Museum of Modern Art in 2000. In 1997, it earned the Chicago Athenaeum Good Design Award.

Rashid also designed the OH Chair for Umbra; a "scoop" of plastic, making use of negative space, modeled into a chair. These chairs are still in the firm's catalogue today.

=== Umbra Shift ===
Umbra Shift is a brand extension of Umbra that utilizes higher end materials and different production techniques. The products are sold through the independent retailers and the Umbra Shift website.

=== Honors ===
- 1997 Good Design Award at the Chicago Athenaeum Museum – Garbino
- 1998 Best Design Strategy Award at the Design Effectiveness Awards
- 1999 IDEA Award – The Oh Chair
- 1999 Best Collection Award at the New York Accent on Design Show
- 1999 Good Design Award at the Chicago Athenaeum Museum – Juxta, Suma, Tri, Jumbo, bi, and Rim Bowls, Slip Shoe Horn
- 1999 Brooklyn Museum of Art – Garbino
- 1999 Permanent SF MOMA Objects, San Francisco – OH Chair
- 2000 Permanent Collection The Museum of Modern Art, NYC, Dept. of Architecture & Design – Garbo
- 2001 Premier’s Award for Outstanding Achievement from the colleges of Ontario – Paul Rowan
- 2003 Good Design Award at the Chicago Athenaeum Museum – Bungee Card Case
- 2006 Housewares Design Award – The Magino Stool
- 2006 Pratt Institute Winner – Conceal Shelf
- 2010 Housewares Design Award International Homewares Association – Fish Hotel
- 2010 Les Mandelbaum and Paul Rowan inducted into the Canadian Marketing Hall of Legends as Visionaries
- 2011 International Forum Product Design Award – Penguin Soap Pump
- 2014 ICFF Editors Award for Best Accessories – Umbra Shift
- 2014 Paul Rowan appointed to the Board of the International Housewares Association
- 2016 Les Mandelbaum awarded EY's 'Entrepreneur of the Year' Consumer Products Category

== Sources ==
- Stanwick, Sean; Flores, Jennifer (2007), Design city Toronto, Interior angles, Chichester, pp. 211–219, ISBN 0-470-03316-9
- Goodfellow, Margaret; Goodfellow, Phil (2010), A guidebook to contemporary architecture in Toronto, Vancouver, pp. 45–48, 103–104, ISBN 1-55365-444-7
- Umbra Inc. U + Studio Collection 2001. vo. 1. Toronto, On: Umbra, 2001. 83 – 96.
