= Gladstone Hotel (Toronto) =

Hotel in Toronto, Ontario

Gladstone House
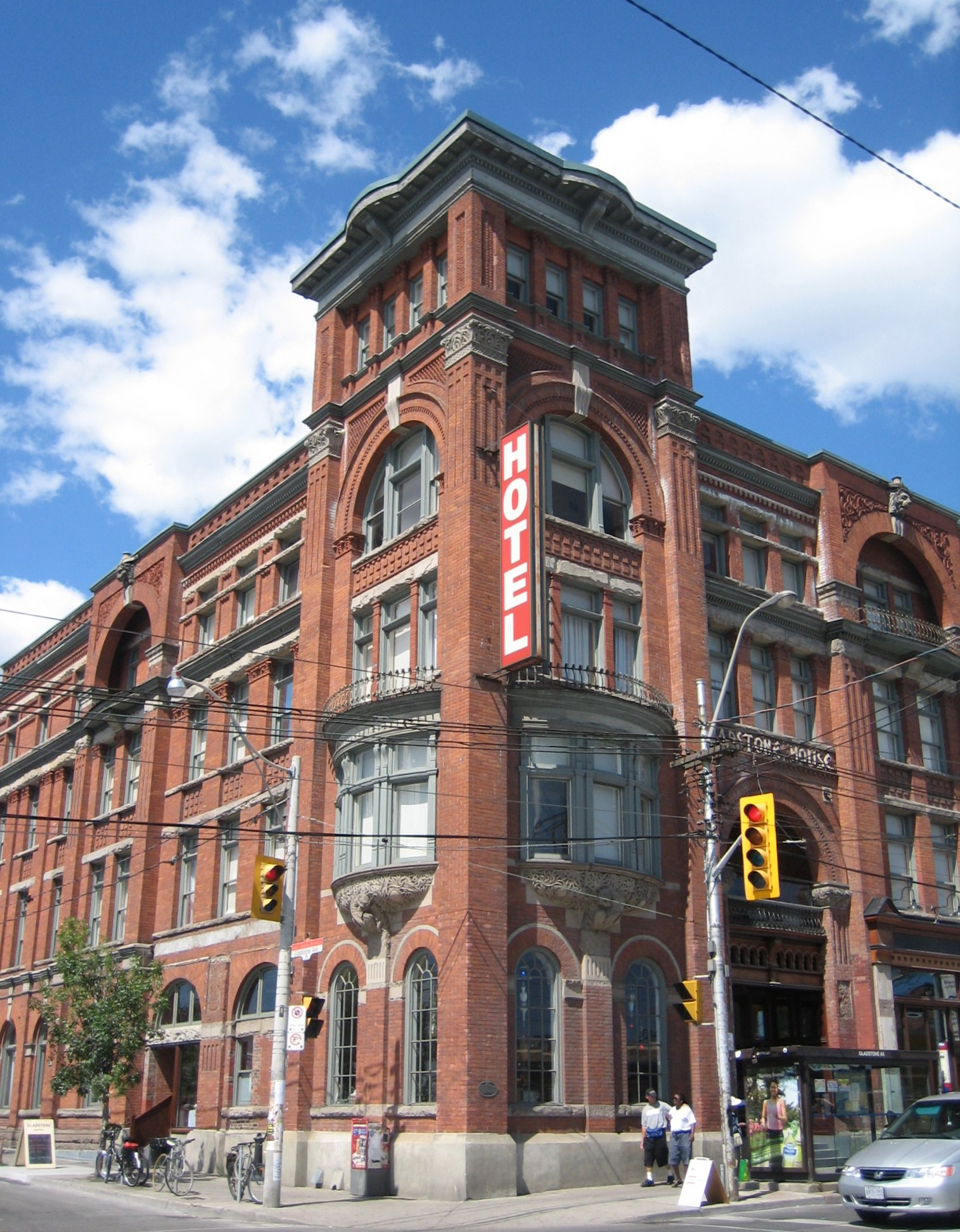
- Former names: Gladstone Hotel

General information
- Type: Hotel
- Architectural style: Richardsonian Romanesque
- Location: 1214 Queen Street West, Toronto, Ontario, Canada
- Coordinates: 43.642683°N 79.427°W
- Named for: Gladstone Avenue
- Year built: 1889
- Cost: CA$30,000

Height
- Height: 16.70 metres (54.8 ft)

Technical details
- Floor count: 5

Design and construction
- Architect: George Martell Miller

Renovating team
- Architect: Eberhard Zeidler
- Renovating firm: Zeidler Partnership

Other information
- Number of rooms: 55
- Number of restaurants: 1
- Number of bars: 1

Website
- gladstonehouse.ca

Gladstone House (formerly the Gladstone Hotel) is a boutique hotel at 1214 Queen Street West in the southern end of the Little Portugal area of Toronto, Ontario, Canada. Since renovations in the early 2000s, the hotel has become an arts hub in the West Queen West neighbourhood of Toronto. The hotel's restaurant and bar is located on the main floor and is known as Gladstone House Bistro + Bar.

The historic building was originally designed by local architect George Martell Miller in the Richardsonian Romanesque style, and it is one of the oldest hotel buildings still operating as a hotel in Toronto. It was built in 1889 and named for Gladstone Avenue, which is beside the hotel. In June 1973, the City of Toronto assigned a Part IV historical designation to the property.

== Architecture ==
The architect of the hotel was George Martell Miller, who designed the Lillian Massey Building of the University of Toronto, many other public buildings in the city, and a large number of grand residential buildings in the Parkdale neighbourhood. The building permit was issued in September 1889 for a value of CA$30,000.

The hotel was designed in the Richardsonian Romanesque style, a popular style at that time for public buildings such as train depots, churches and libraries. The architecture of the Gladstone is characterized by the rough-cut stone and brick, as well as by the dramatic arches over the windows and porch entrances. The hotel's corner tower is also characteristic of the style. The cupola was removed during the 1940s due to disrepair.

The Gladstone retains its original plaster mouldings in the grand hallways. In the hotel's Melody Bar, the two restored pillars' faux marble finish was rendered in true European fresco technique. No other architectural pillars such as these exist in Toronto. The meticulously restored elevator from 1903 is one of the last hand-operated elevators in Toronto. Zeidler Partnership and Eb Zeidler were the architects for the restoration of the hotel.

== History ==
The hotel was built in 1889 across Queen Street from the then-existing Parkdale railroad station, which serviced the Grand Trunk, the Canadian Pacific Railway (CPR) and the Canadian National Railway (CNR) companies. In addition to serving the three major railway companies, it also provided visitors attending the Canadian National Exhibition (CNE) with a place to stay. The original owner, Susanna Robinson, was a widow who operated and lived at the hotel with her 13 children. Her husband, Nixon Robinson, a brewer, died during the construction of the hotel.

The hotel was named for Gladstone Avenue, which got its name from British prime minister William Ewart Gladstone. The hotel's monthly newsletter, the Gladstone Bag, is named for the suitcase style, which was also named for William Gladstone. The hotel was one of the first ten hotels in Ontario to receive permission to allow patrons to drink and play shuffleboard in a licensed alcoholic area. At one time, it was the last place to obtain hard liquor before reaching Hamilton.

A report appeared in the Toronto Star on October 3, 1911, indicating that the Gladstone was soon to become the property of an incorporated company. The owner at that time was Victor E. Gianelli. Interviewed by the Star, Gianelli stated that the deal had not yet been closed, but the plan was to increase the size of the hotel and improve its facilities. In 1912, the Gladstone Hotel Company, of which Thomas Slattery was the manager, purchased the Gladstone Hotel property from Gianelli for $110,000. Slattery had earlier purchased the license for $60,000. It was reported that extensive alterations were to be made to the property.

Over time, the hotel passed from owner to owner, and it gradually deteriorated in status. During the 1950s, the hotel was updated with metal sheathing and glass block. The hotel was purchased by the Appelby family in 1964, and the family restored the exterior in 1989. The hotel's bar was named Bronco's and was a venue for live country and western music. In 1992, artist Walt Rushton, who lived in the hotel, painted a mural of historic methods of transportation in Canada as a Toronto 200-year anniversary project on the Gladstone Avenue windows of the hotel. The son of boxer George Chuvalo was found dead at the hotel in the mid-1990s of a heroin overdose.

In 2000, the Tippin and Zeidler families purchased the 60-room hotel for CA$2.25 million. Bronco's became the Art Bar jazz venue. In December 2001, the hotel was put up for sale for $3.3 million. On February 20, 2002, co-owner Michael Tippin served immediate eviction notices on the tenants, citing a lack of insurance on the building, but a last-minute reprieve by Margaret Zeidler let the tenants stay after the hotel closed. The next day, the Zeidlers announced that they had found insurance for the hotel, allowing it to remain open. The Zeidlers became sole owners of the hotel in 2003 and the venue began to host art shows, openings and community meetings, as well as live music.

In 2004, the Zeidlers began a restoration of the hotel, which was completed in 2005. Eberhard Zeidler was the architect involved and two of his daughters, Margie and Christina, oversaw operations and management. Margaret Zeidler, who was involved in the restoration of 401 Richmond Street West, had originally bought the hotel and made arrangements to have her sister manage it. The owners invited local artists to compete in a competition for new designs for hotel rooms, each with a main concept or idea. The renovation reduced the number of rooms to 37, each one-of-a-kind, from the winning proposals. The Gladstone kept its bar and event venue spaces open and operating throughout the restoration process.

The long-term tenants were moved out of the hotel in June 2004, when it became clear that the hotel needed extensive refurbishing, and the hotel's third and fourth floors (the hotel room floors) required three months of closure. The Zeidlers helped the tenants find new homes in the community prior to beginning the restoration project. The family provided financial support, and the employees at the hotel worked to find homes for the most elderly and at-risk. Some of the former residents moved to the Parkview Arms Hotel, down Queen Street beside Trinity Bellwoods Park. The story of the tenants' leaving is documented in the Last Call at the Gladstone Hotel documentary.

In 2004, the Gladstone began hosting Come Up To My Room, an alternative design exhibition showcasing new and established local art/design talent, co-founded and co-curated by Christina Zeidler and Pamila Matharu. It is run annually as part of the Toronto Design Offsite Festival, during Toronto Design Week.

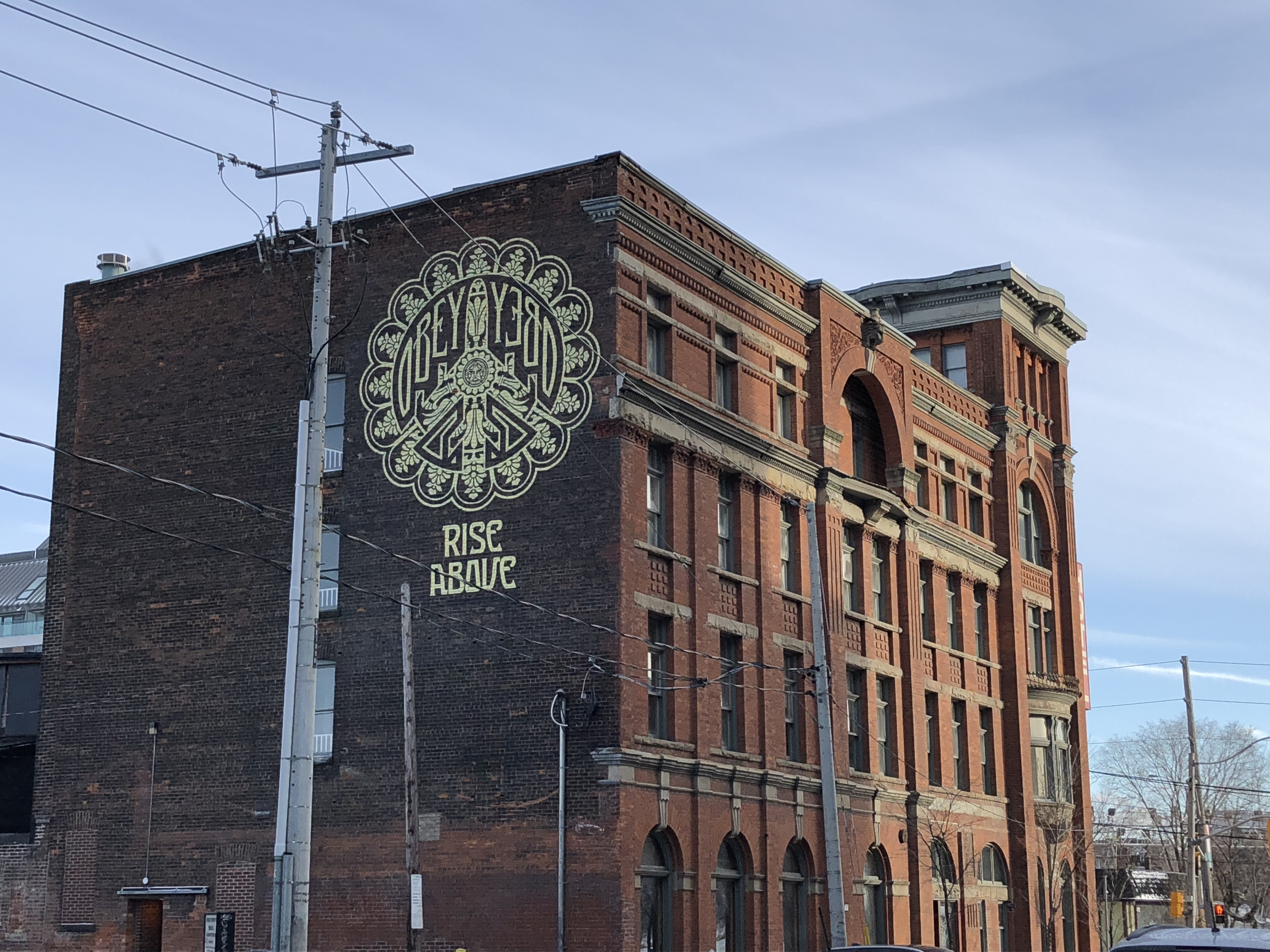
Queen West, Parkdale, Toronto

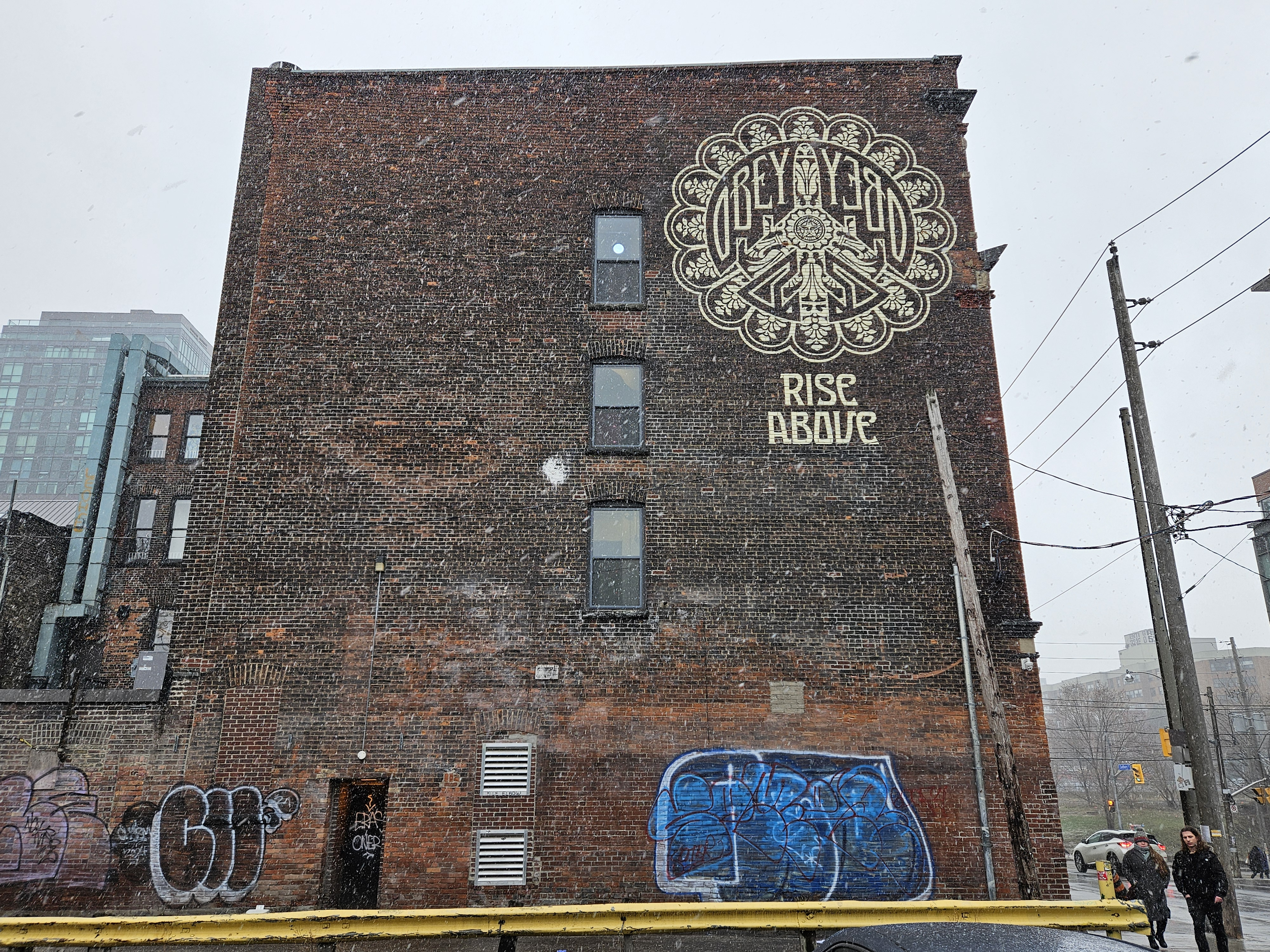
Back of Gladstone hotel

== Last Call at the Gladstone Hotel ==
A documentary film, Last Call at the Gladstone Hotel, was created by Last Call Productions as a portrait of the effects of urban renewal on the poor, as the Gladstone was being converted from a skid row flophouse to an arts and music hotspot. It was filmed over a span of five years, showing that the developers' plan for a gradual restoration with staff and residents remaining upstairs – while the bar served designer drinks to a new, affluent clientele downstairs – didn't work. City inspectors demanded a complete rewiring, the boiler blew up leaving the hotel without heat, ceilings leaked, walls crumbled and management had to cope with this reality.

== Sale to developers ==
In early March 2020, an announcement was made that the property had been sold to developers Streetcar Developments and Dream Unlimited, who have experience with "character projects". The buyers issued statements indicating that the building would be restored. The hotel has had a heritage designation from the City of Toronto since June 1973.

== See also ==
- Drake Hotel (Toronto)
