= Large Two Forms =

Sculpture by Henry Moore

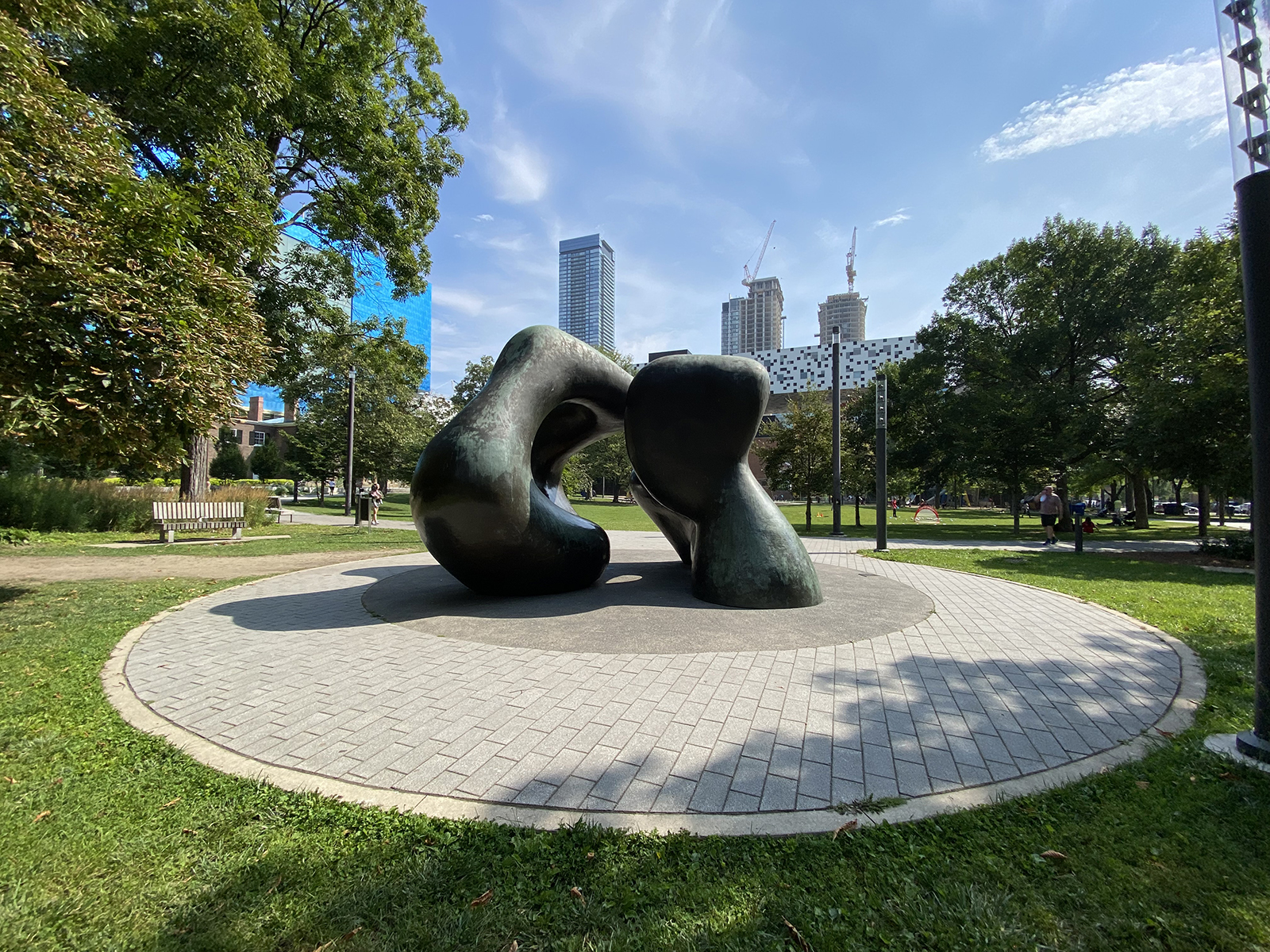
- The cast in Grange Park, 2023
- Artist: Henry Moore

Large Two Forms (LH 566) is a 1966–1969 sculpture by Henry Moore. The monumental sculpture measures 365 cm × 610 cm × 400 cm (144 in × 240 in × 157 in). It comprises two large curving elements that almost meet. The organic shapes, each with oval openings, resemble two human pelvis bones, positioned as if copulating. The work may have a distant relationship to his 1934 sculpture Two Forms (LH 153) in pynkado wood, now held by the Museum of Modern Art in New York.

Moore made a small 16.5 cm (6.5 in) plaster maquette of the work that became Large Two Forms in 1966. This maquette (LH 554a) was cast in bronze (LH 554b) in 1976, in an edition of 9+1 (nine plus an artist's cast). Moore carved a single 97 cm (38 in) stone version (LH 555) in red travertine in 1966.

The plaster maquette was scaled up into a full-sized version using polystyrene blocks, and was cast in bronze by Hermann Noack's foundry in Berlin, in an edition 4+1 (four made in 1969, plus an artist's cast made posthumously in 1992). The two elements weigh about 3.5 tonnes each. There were also unique versions in plaster and fibreglass, the latter created to be more mobile for exhibition, for example in 1971 at the Belvedere in Florence and the Tuileries Garden in Paris.

Four of the five bronze casts are displayed at the Yorkshire Sculpture Park, the Art Gallery of Ontario in Toronto, the Neuberger Museum of Art at the State University of New York at Purchase, and outside the former Federal Chancellery building in Bonn.

== Toronto cast ==
Cast number 1 was installed in Toronto, Ontario, Canada, in 1973. Originally located next to the Art Gallery of Ontario at the corner of Dundas and McCaul streets, the artwork was moved in 2017 and is now installed in Grange Park.

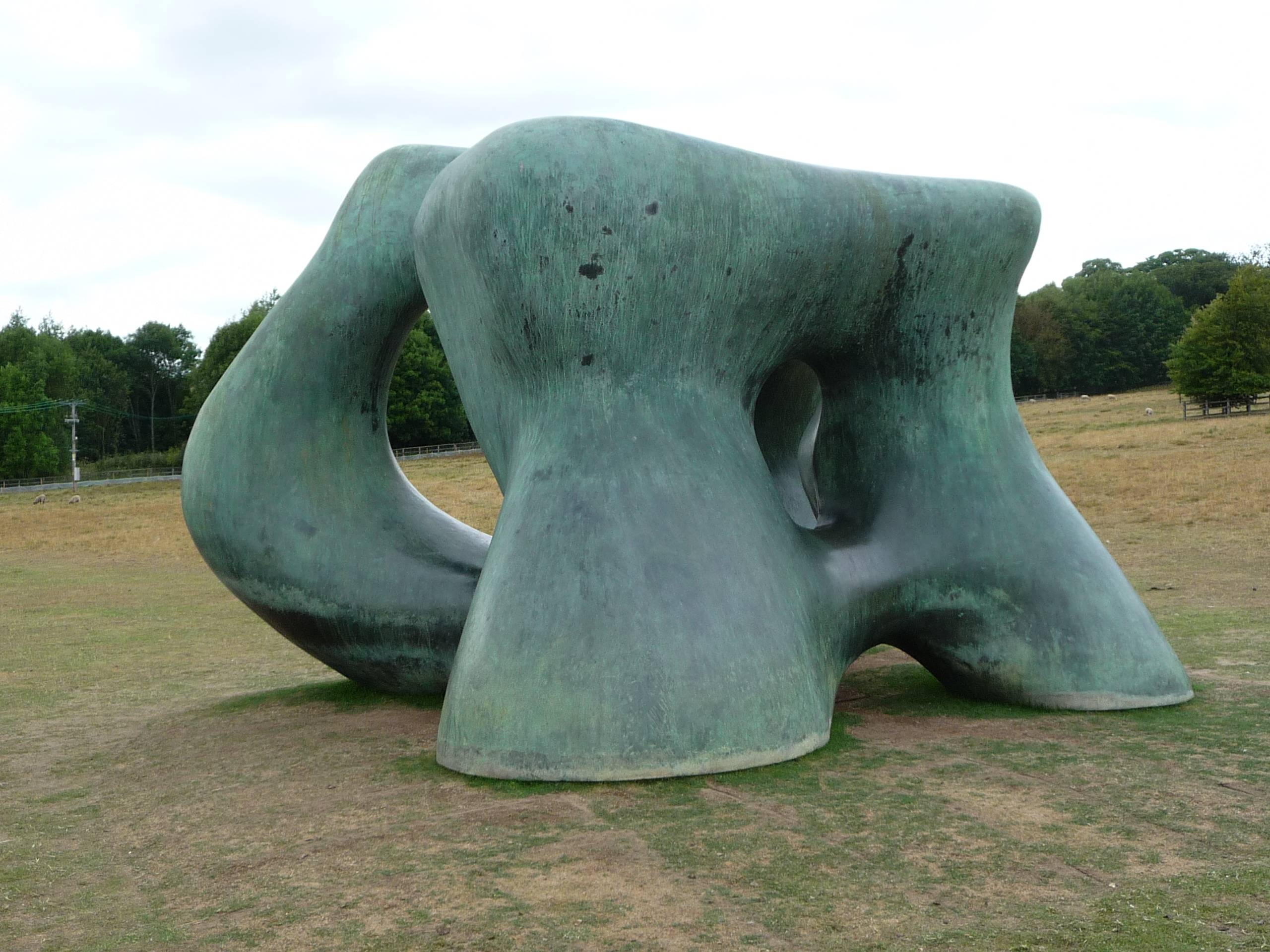
Yorkshire

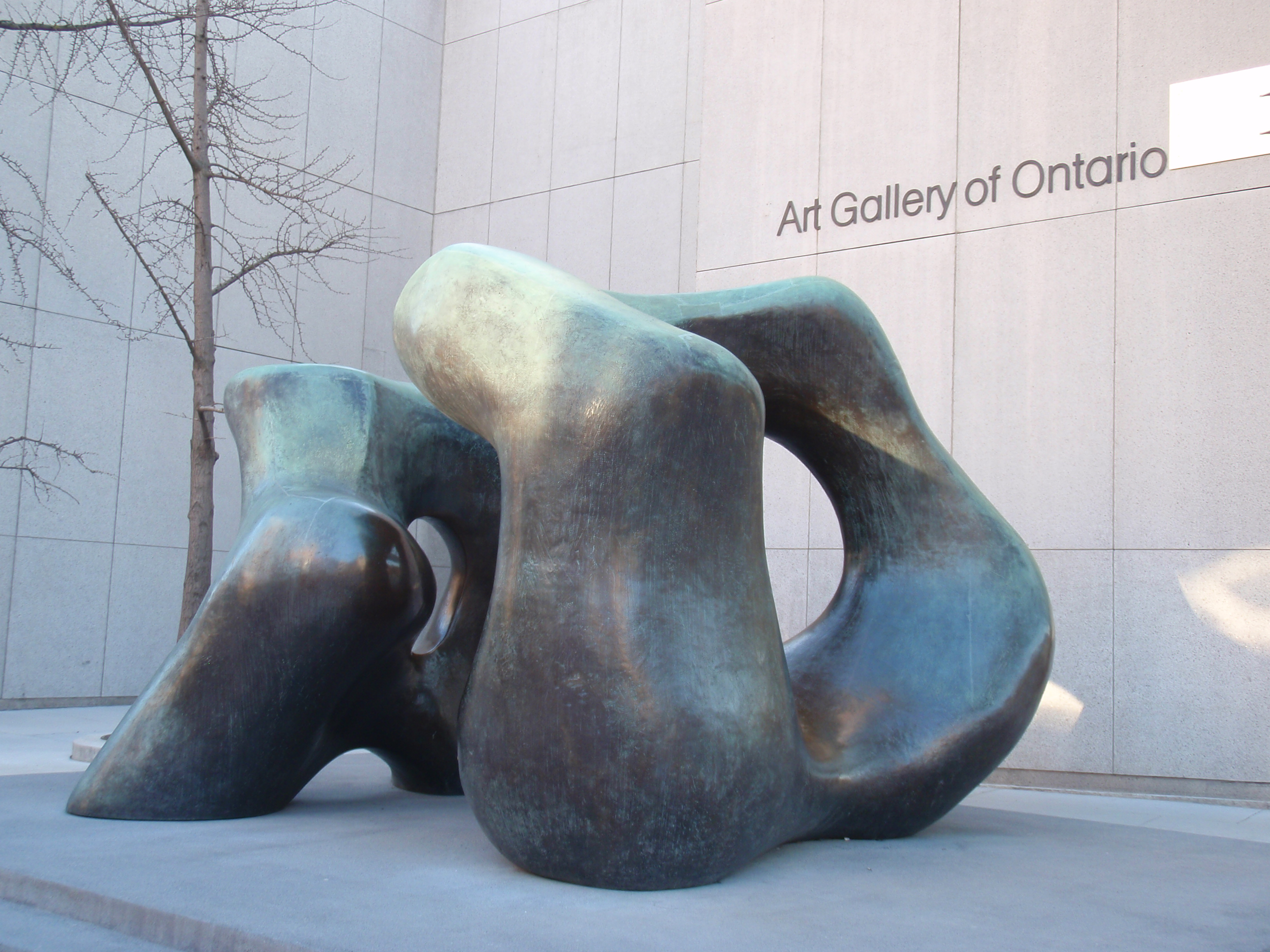
Toronto, before 2017

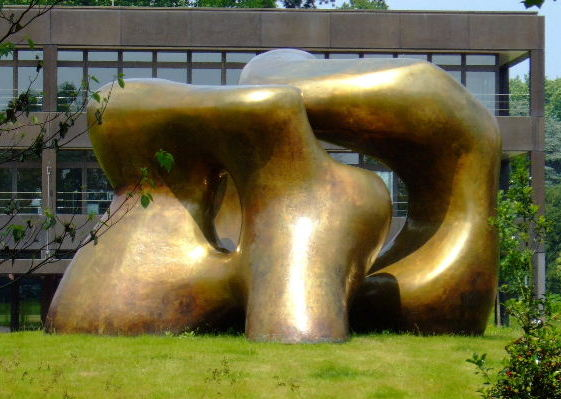
Bonn

== See also ==
- List of sculptures by Henry Moore
