= DesignTO =

DesignTO (known as the Toronto Design Offsite Festival until 2019) is a nonprofit arts organization that is most well known for the DesignTO Festival, a design week showcasing Canadian designers held in Toronto, Ontario, Canada. Each year, the DesignTO Festival features over 100 free exhibitions and events.

In 2015, the festival added an annual self-produced exhibition component entitled White Out, TO DO Talks, located at various locations around the city, and Outside the Box, an exhibition where correspondents across the Americas curate original works and then ship them to Toronto for exhibition. Outside the Box was also exhibited in New York City for Wanted Design NYC in May 2015. The alternative design exhibition, Come Up To My Room, is one of the events under the TO DO umbrella.

In 2013, the festival added an awards component, the TO DO Awards, presented by Herman Miller, with jury and people's choice categories, and the TO DO Festival opening party, a celebration of the launch of festival week. The juror's choice for "Best in Festival" that year went to Mason Studio for "Cloud Sourcing", a design installation that consisted of cloud-like objects made from tissue paper.
