= Hlynur Atlason =

Icelandic industrial designer (born 1974)

- Born: April 19, 1974; Reykjavík, Iceland
- Education: Parsons The New School for Design
- Occupation: Industrial Designer
- Children: 2
- Website: www.atlason.com

Hlynur Atlason (born April 19, 1974) is an Icelandic industrial designer based in New York City.

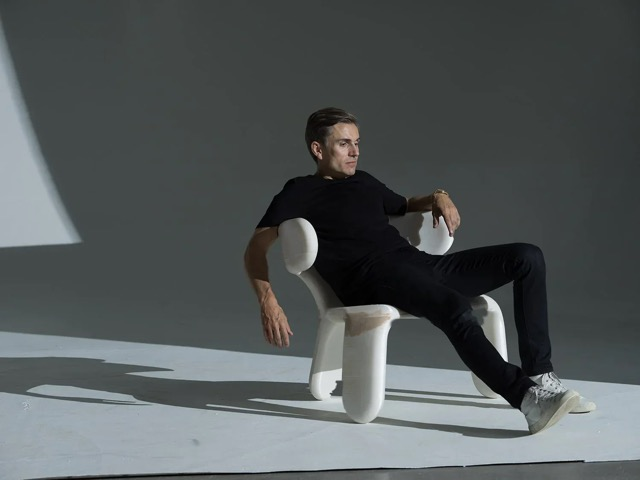
Hlynur Atlason

== Education and Career ==
Atlason's career as a designer started at ten years old winning an essay competition for the Icelandic Ministry of Welfare, which resulted in an ad campaign and a slogan “Your teeth, Your choice”. This ad campaign which was featured on buses all over Reykjavík and was used as an example in parliamentary discussions about healthcare in Iceland.

After living for some time in Copenhagen and two years in Paris studying at the Sorbonne and Parsons Paris, he moved to New York City to pursue a degree in Industrial Design at Parsons the New School for Design completing his degree in 2001. Shortly before graduating from Parsons, Ikea produced his "Tuno" clock for their 2002 PS Collection.

Since setting up a design studio, Atlason, in 2004, his professional projects include furniture for Design Within Reach and Ercol, a female body razor for Billie, a condiment holder for the Museum of Modern Art, lighting for Artecnica and Hennepin Made and packing for Xbox and Stella Artois.

Atlason has been an adjunct lecturer at Parsons the New School for Design since 2014 and the School of Visual Arts in 2017. As of 2023, he was an MFA Products of Design faculty member.

His work has been published in books and periodicals, including The Design Encyclopedia, published by the Museum of Modern Art, The International Design Year Book 18 edited by designer Karim Rashid, and On the Cutting Edge: Design in Iceland, edited by German design and art historian and curator Klaus Klemp. Several publications have also featured his work, among them Metropolis, I.D., Core77, Design Milk, Dwell, Wallpaper, Blueprint, The New York Times, Azure, and CBN weekly.

== Awards ==
- 2019 — Allure Best of Beauty, Billie razor
- 2023 — Cooper Hewitt, Smithsonian National Design Museum, National Design Award — Winner in Industrial Design.
- 2023 — Interior Design Magazine HiP Award — Winner, Outdoor Seating (Limbo for Heller)
- 2023 — MetropolisLikes NeoCon Award — Winner (Limbo for Heller)
- 2023 — Interior Design Magazine Best of Year Award — Winner, Outdoor Seating (Limbo for Heller)
- 2023 — Architectural Record Best Outdoor Products of 2023 (Limbo and Bluff for Heller)
- 2025 — iF Design Award (NEXT Modular Sensor System for Vicon)

== Exhibitions ==
- 2001 Public life, Private Realm, Parsons School of Design
- 2001 and 2002 In Transit 1 & 2, Terminal Store, New York
- 2002 Make Room, Salone Satellite, Salone del Mobile, Milan.
- 2013 Artecnica, ICFF, New York
- 2014 Umbra Shift, ICFF, New York
- 2018 Von Collection for Ercol, Salone del Mobile, Milan.
- 2023 — Next Generation of Modern, Heller Gallery, New York.

== Books ==
Work featured in the following:

- 2003 - International Design Yearbook 18 by Karim Rashid 2003 ISBN 0789207885
- 2004 - Product Design 3 by B. Martin Pederson 2004 ISBN 1931241317
- 2004 - The Design Encyclopedia: Museum of Modern Art by Mel Byars 2004 ISBN 087070012X
- 2004 - New Scandinavian Design by Katherine Nelson, Raul Cabra 2004 ISBN 0811840409
- 2011 - On the Cutting Edge: Design in Iceland by Klaus Klemp, Mathias Wagner 2011 ISBN 389955390X
- 2024 - Phaidon's Designed for Life: The World's Best Product Designers ISBN 978-1838667696
