= Jeremias Schultz =

Dutch painter (1723–1800)

- Born: before 11 October 1723; Berlin
- Died: 11 October 1800 (aged 77); Amsterdam
- Resting place: Heiligewegs- en Leidsche Kerkhof
- Notable work: Portrait of Eleonora Susette
- Relatives: J.C. Schultsz (cousin)

Signature
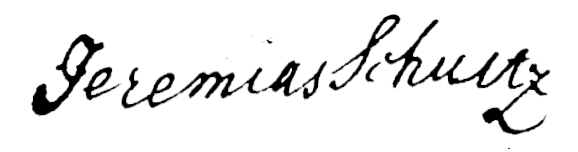

Jeremias Schultz (before 11 October 1723, Berlin – 11 October 1800, Amsterdam) was a Dutch painter, illustrator, and etcher.

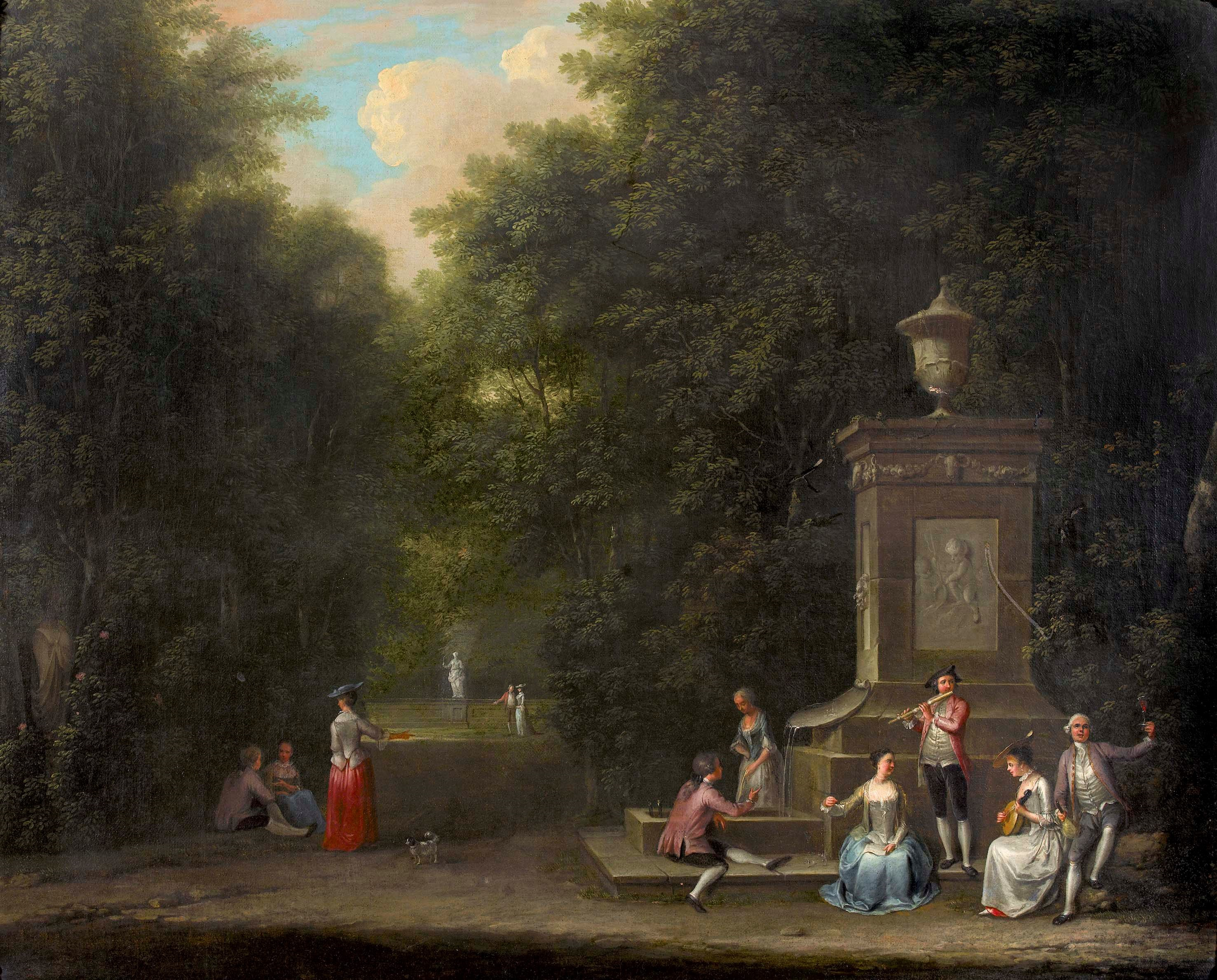
Elegant company in a park (first half 18th century)

== Biography ==
Jeremias Schultz (also spelt as Schultsz, Schulz, and Schultze) was born in Berlin, Germany, in 1723 as the son of shoemaker Christoph and Elisabeth Schultz. He was baptised on 11 October 1723, in the parish of St. Nicholas in Berlin. Around 1743, he and his brother, Johann Georg, moved to Amsterdam, the Netherlands.

In Amsterdam, he worked as a wall painting artist in the factory of Jan Hendrik Troost van Groenendoelen. In 1749, he temporarily becomes a member of the Stadstekenacademie, where he meets artists Jacob de Wit and Frans van der Mijn. In 1750, he collaborated with Jacob de Wit on an art cabinet, which later came into the possession of family de Bosch and can be seen in a work by Tibout Regters.

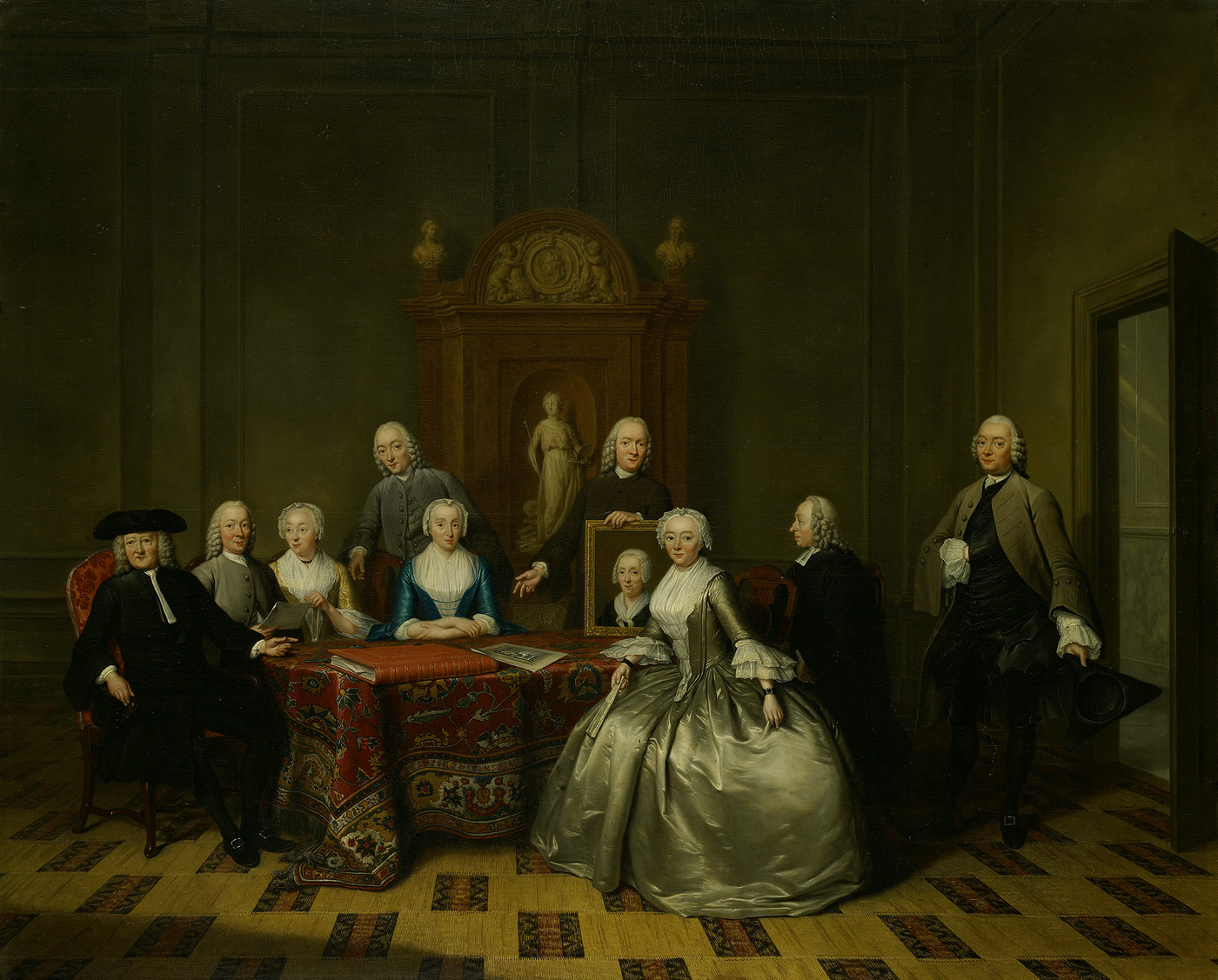
Portrait family de Bosch, by Tibout Regters (1750). With in the background a part of the art cabinet by Jeremias Schultz and Jacob de Wit

Between 1750 and 1781, he paints several portraits. In addition, he is a teacher in the apprenticeship of his cousin, Johan Christoffel Schultsz, and artists P.J. Rink, Arend Alans, and Isaac Cordes Jansz.

In 1766, he became a member of the Guild of Saint Luke, together with his cousin. In 1797, he becomes board member of the Guild, and in 1800 the president.

In January 1751, he marries Anna Helena van der Mijn, daughter of painter Herman van der Mijn, and sister of painters Cornelia, Frans and George van der Mijn. In 1759, after the death of his first wife, he remarries Jacoba Catarina Smidt, daughter of tapestry painter Johannes Smit de Jonge. From these marriages, he had three daughters.

Jeremias Schultz passed away on 11 October 1800 in Amsterdam, and was buried on 13 October at the Heiligewegs- en Leidsche Kerkhof, Amsterdam.

== Art work ==
Schultz's work mainly contains portraits of people from Amsterdam, Deventer, and Kampen. The portraits of the Schultz–de la Sablonière Family were commissioned by his cousin, Beata Louisa Schultz–de la Sablonière. She was through her father, Ephraïm Schultz, a relative of the painter Jeremias (her cousin (Note: Their fathers are full brothers (from Berlin).)).

The Portrait of Eleonora Susette is on display in the Art Gallery of Ontario. The portrait of Michiel is in unknown private possession. The portraits of Stephen Hendrik de la Sablonière, his wife Beata "Bartje" Louisa Schultz, and their son Jacobus "Cootje" Johannes Christoffel are in the possession of their descendants, the Family van den Hoek–Veldjesgraaf from Kampen.

Several of his portraits and other works are part of museum collections worldwide. A portrait of an Armenian merchant in Amsterdam is on display in the San Lazzaro degli Armeni. The works of minister Christiaan Slichtenbree and his wife are part of the collection of Museum de Waag in Deventer.

Other works by Schultz are in the possession of private collectors. More of his works are listed in auction catalogues; however, their current state and whereabouts are unknown. It contains portraits, landscapes, painted wall art, and reproductions of other works in several art forms.

== Art catalogue (selection) ==
Portrait of Margaretha Hoepeling (ca. 1750)

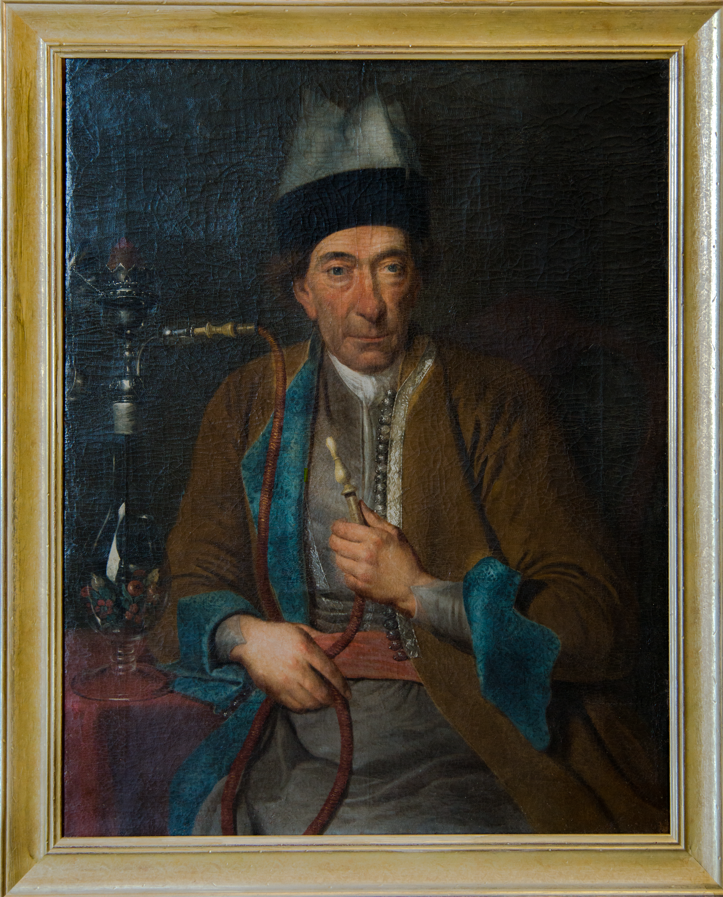
Portrait of an Armenian merchant (1769)

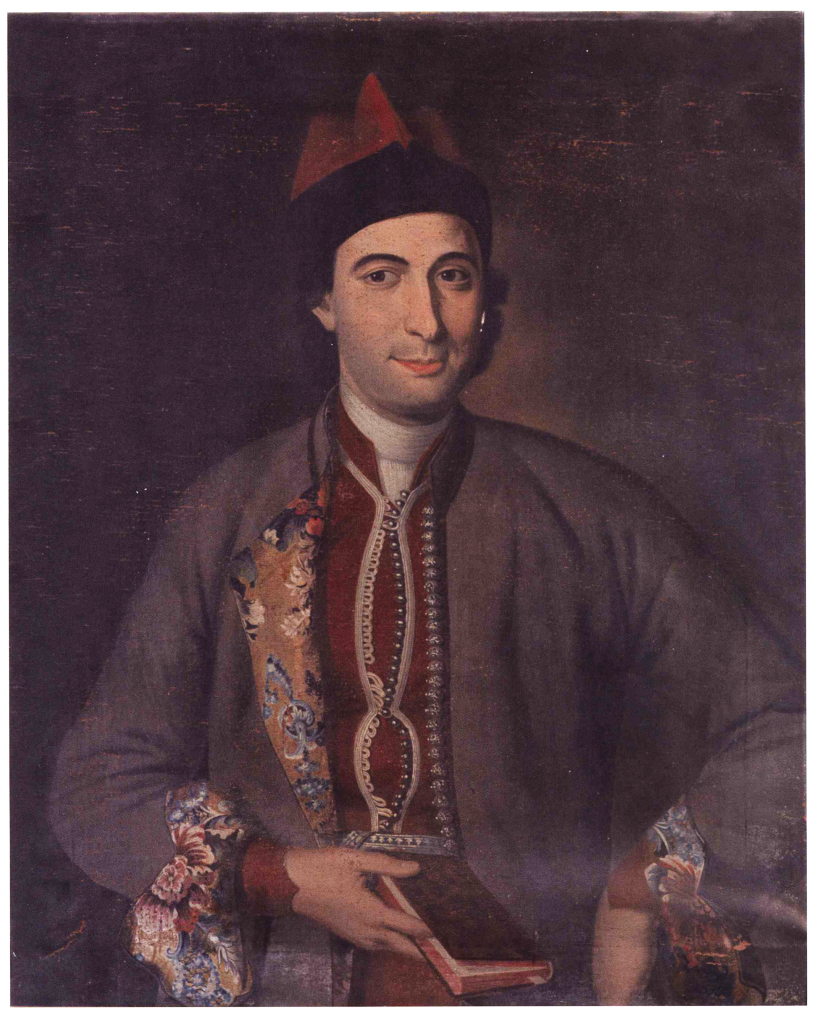
Portrait of an Armenian merchant (1769)
Portraits of 1781

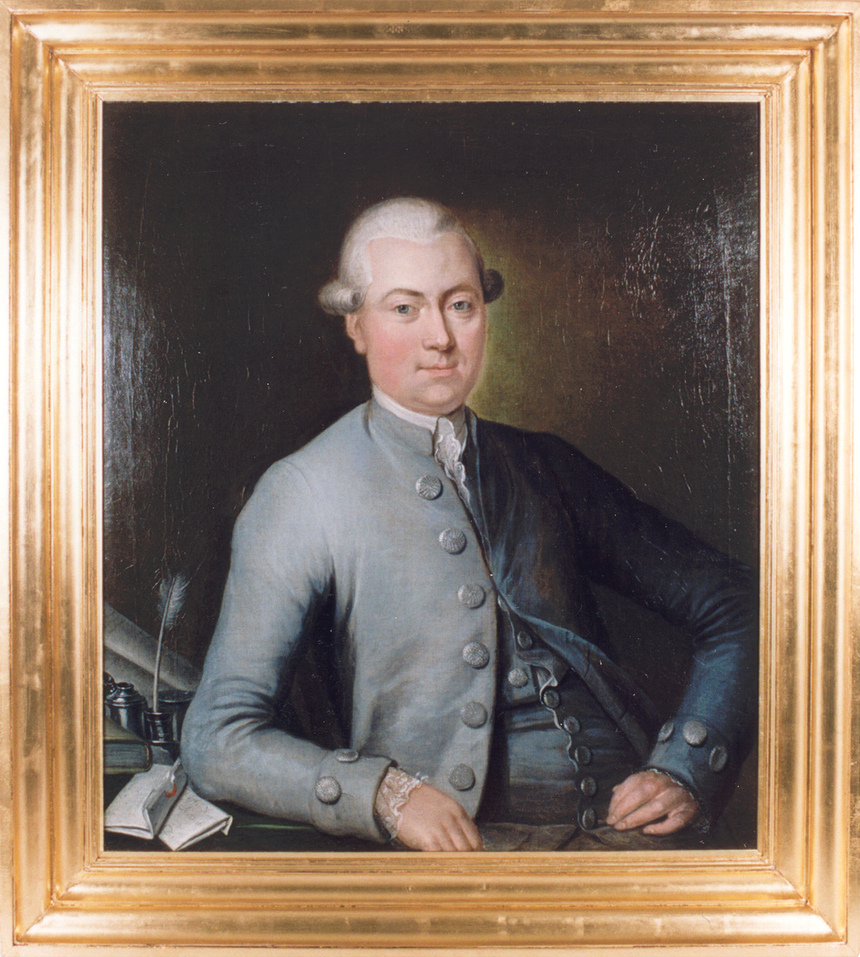
Portrait of Christiaan Slichtenbree
[oil on canvas, 82 × 72 cm]

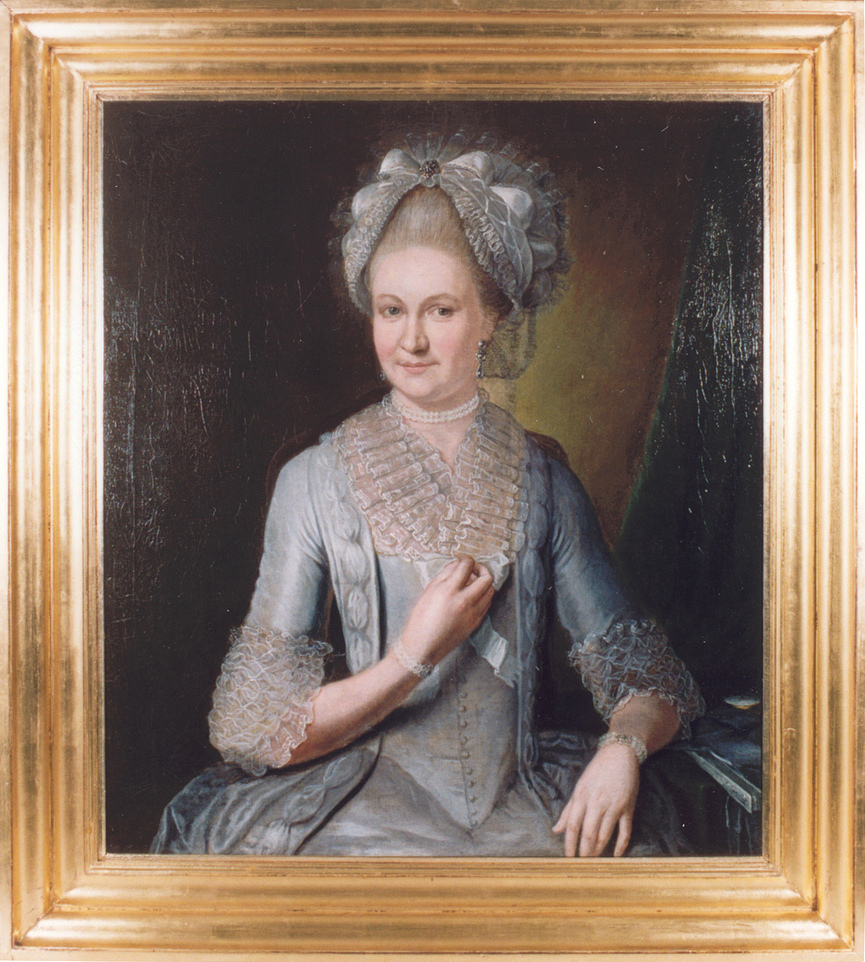
Portrait of Anna Helena Zegerius
[oil on canvas, 83 × 75 cm]

=== Portraits commissioned by the Schultz–de la Sablonière Family ===
Portraits of 1768

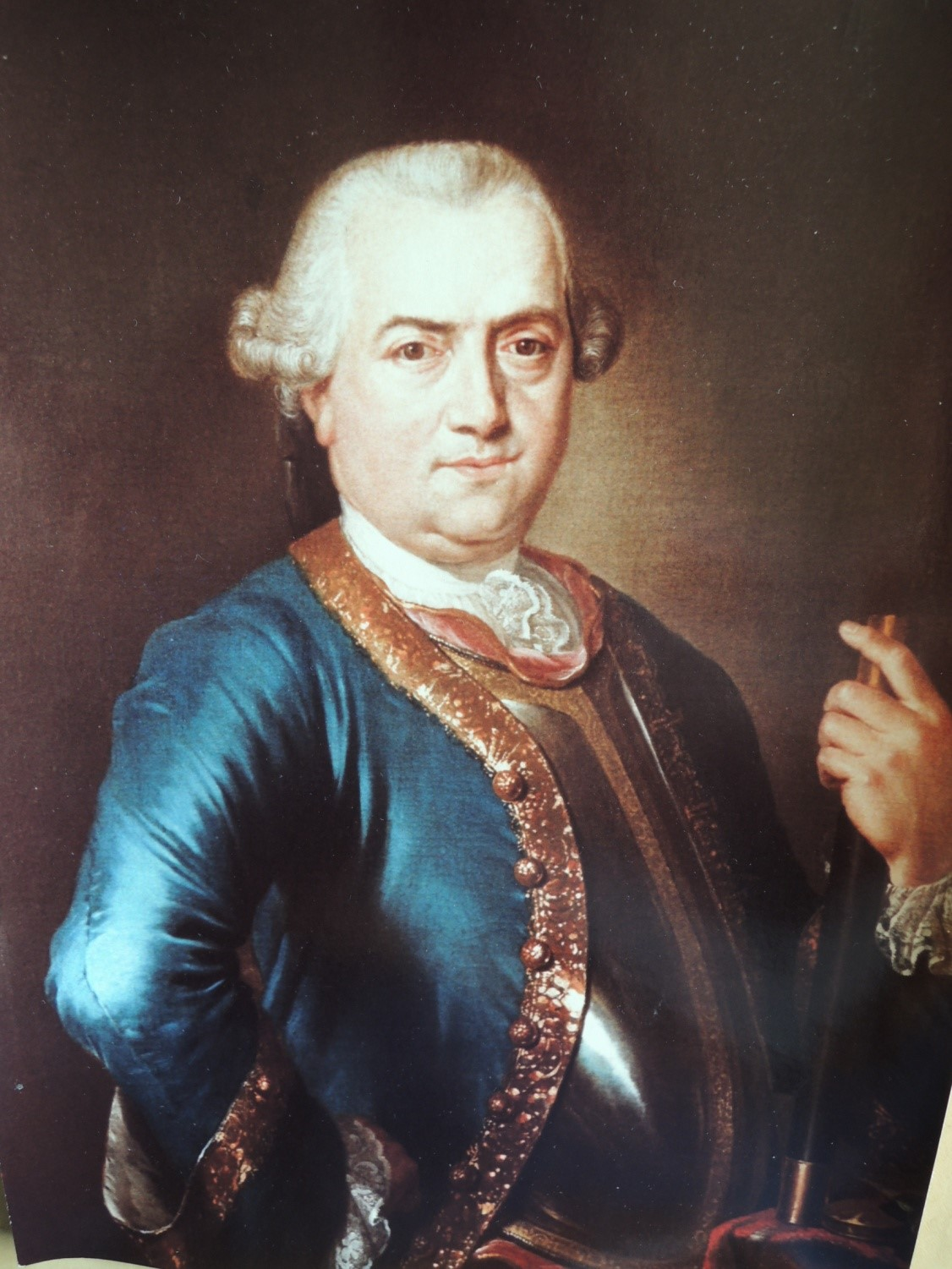
Portrait of Stephen Hendrik de la Sablonière

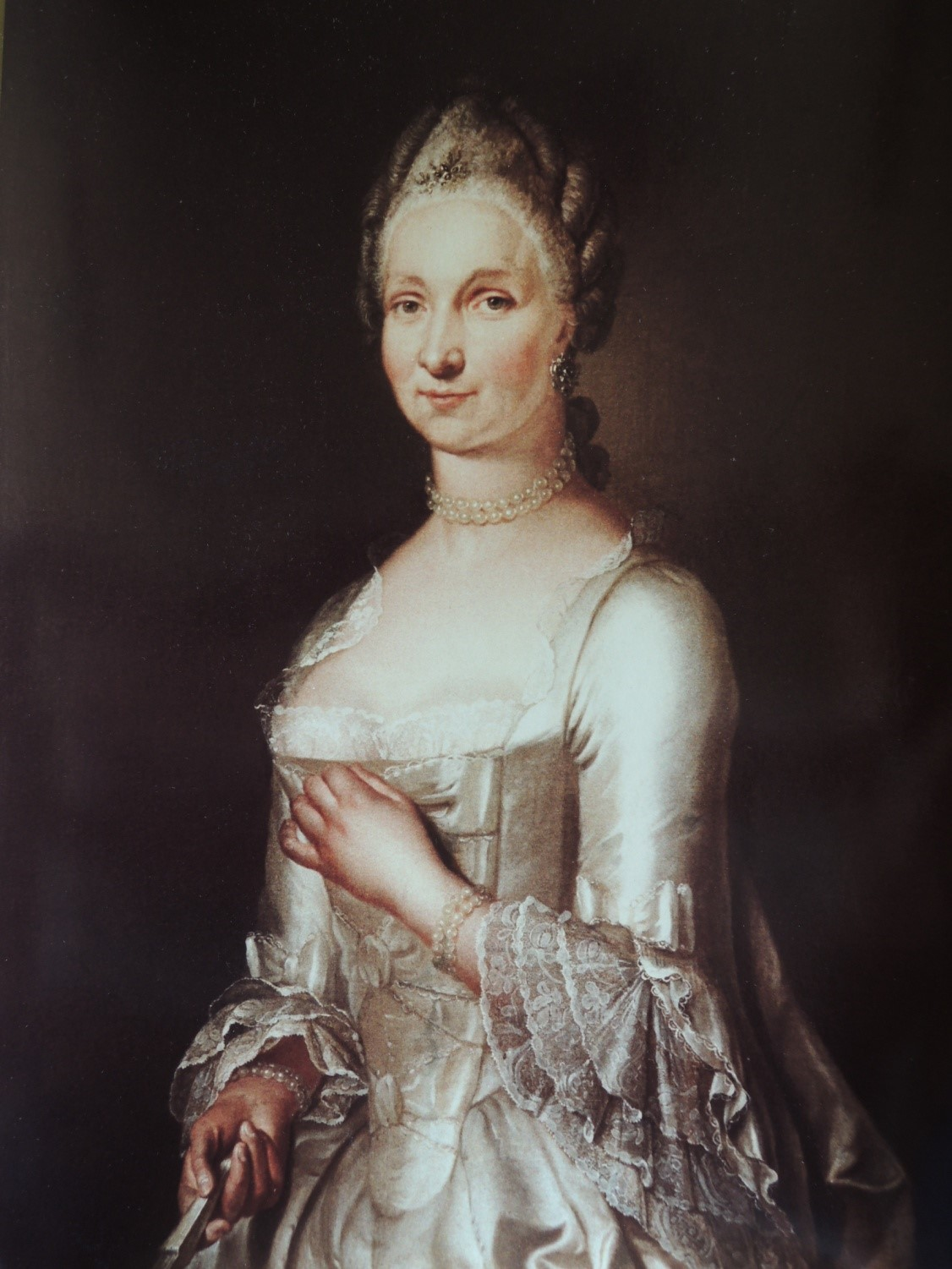
Portrait of Beata Louise Schultz
Portraits ca. 1774/'75

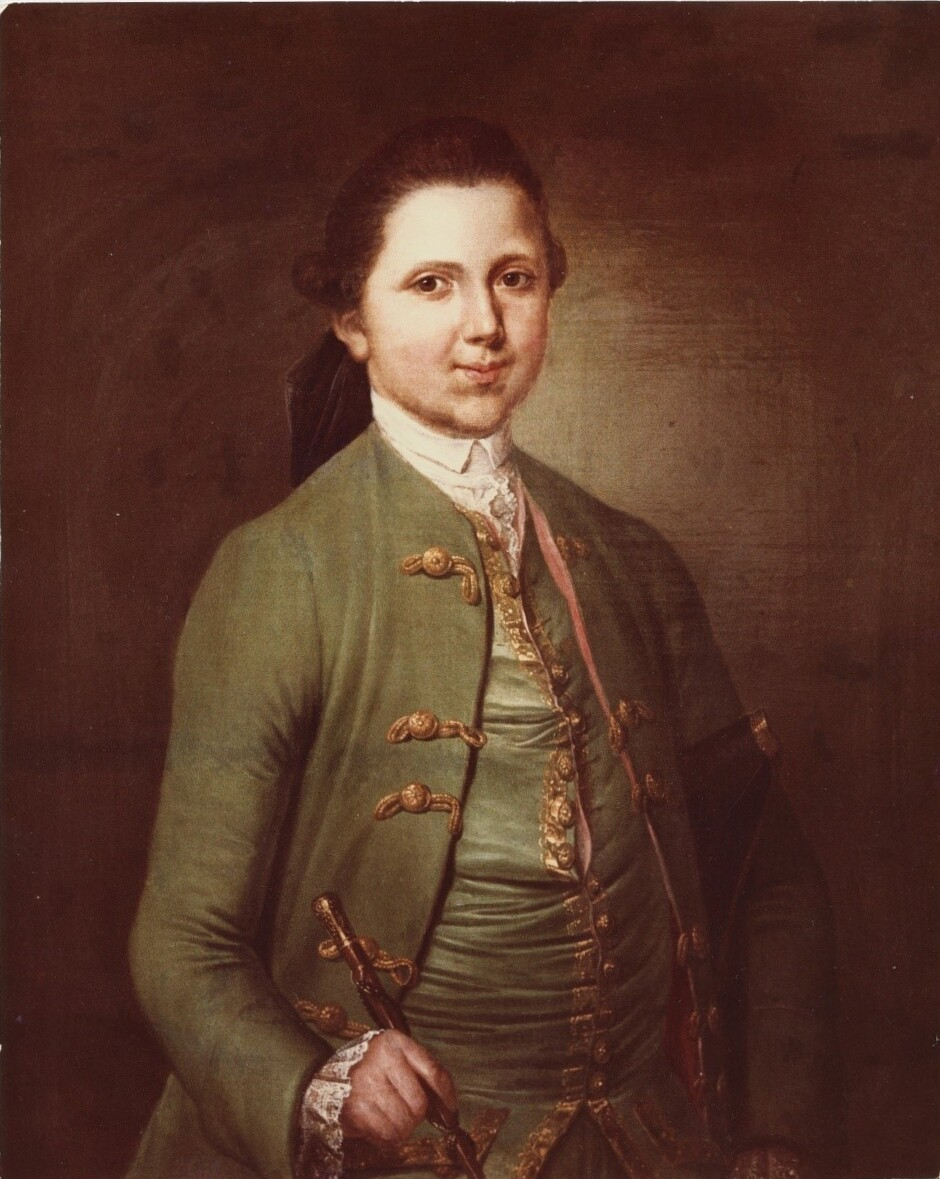
Portrait of Jacobus "Cootje" Johannes Christoffel de la Sablonière

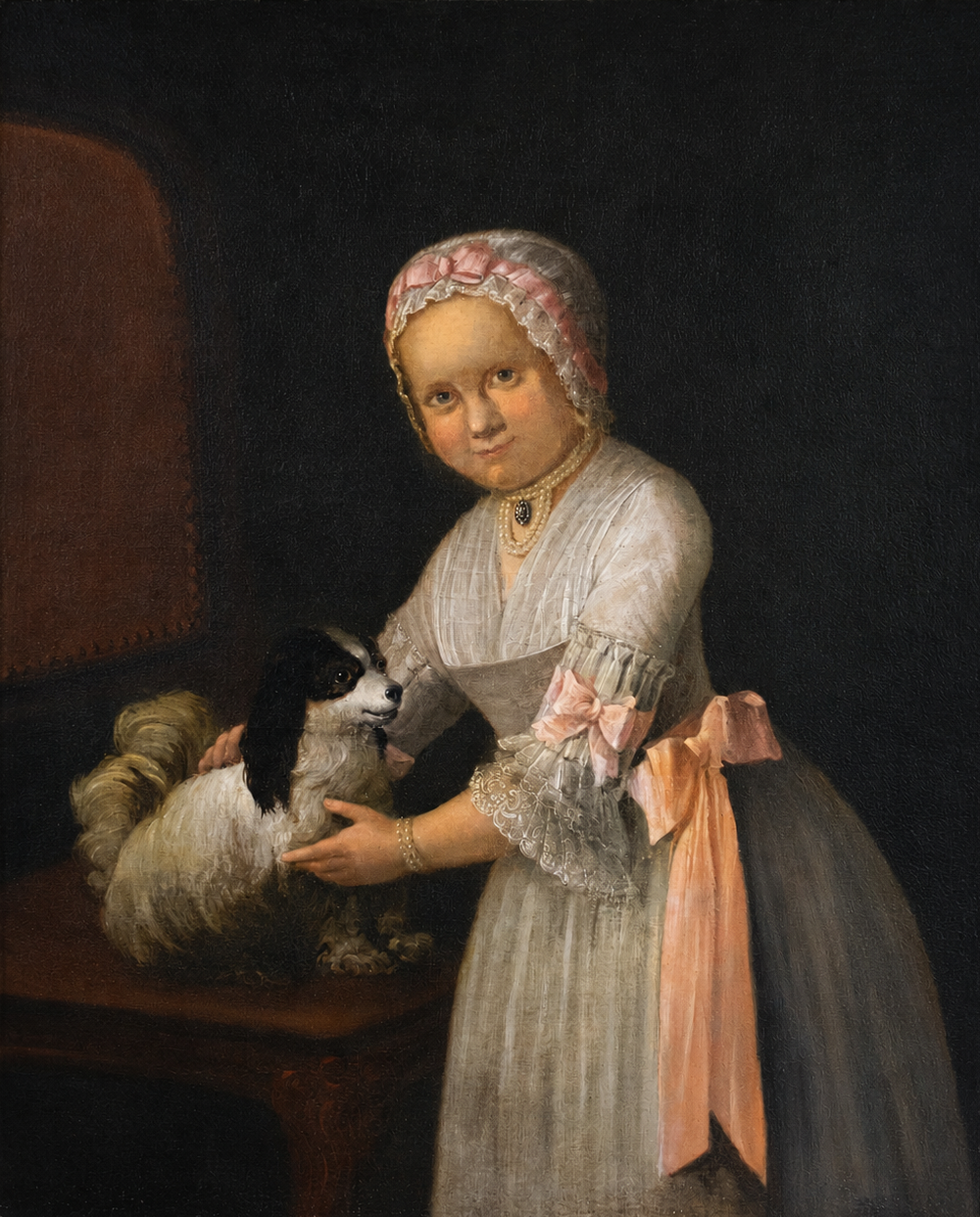
Portrait of Ephraïma "Eefje" Bartha Johanna de la Sablonière

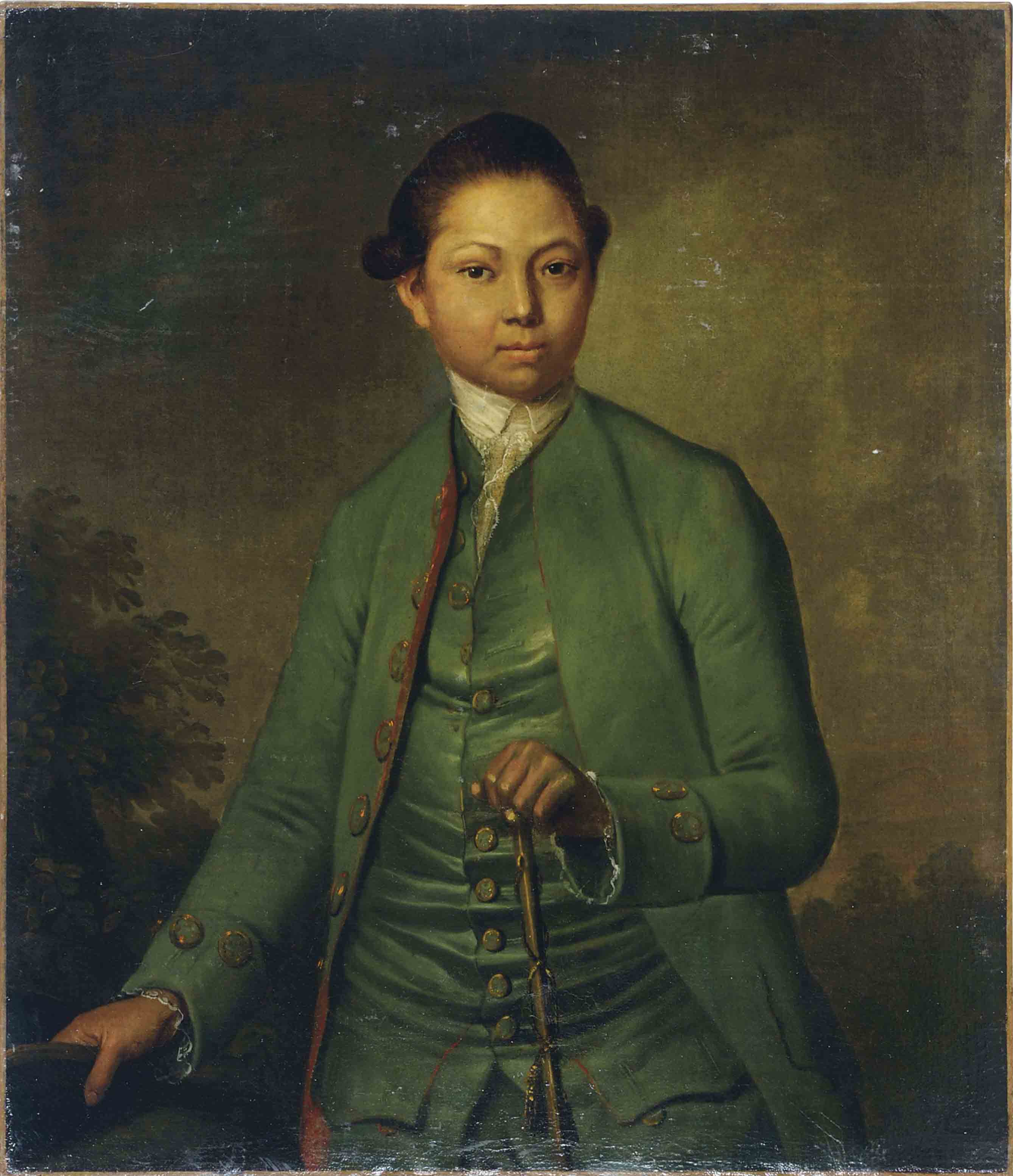
Portrait of Michiel
[oil on canvas, 80 × 68,6 cm]

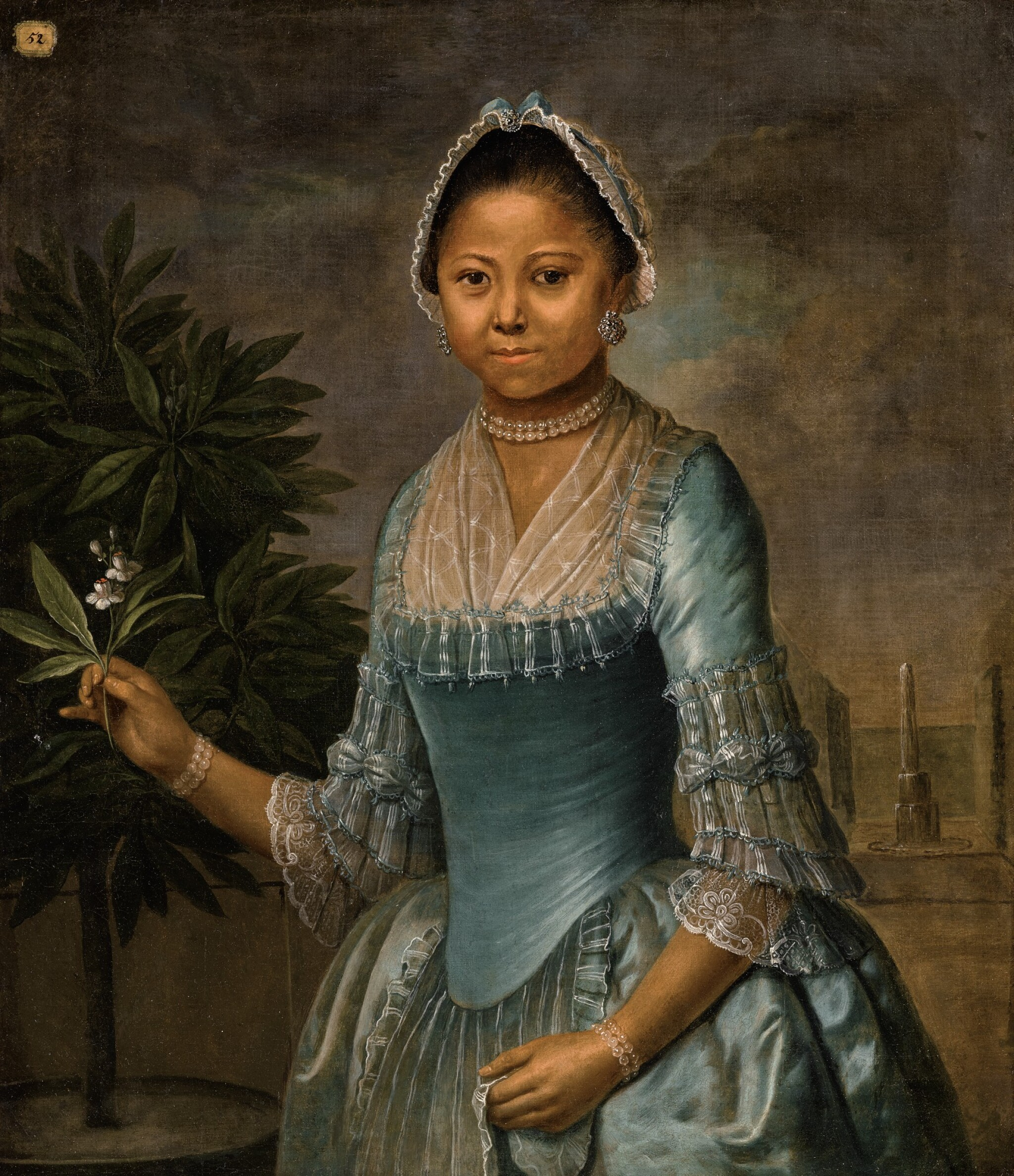
Portrait of Eleonora Susette (1775)
[oil on canvas, 80 × 69,2 cm]
