= Portrait of Eleonora Susette =

Painting by Jeremias Schultz (1775)

- Portrait of a Lady Holding an Orange Blossom
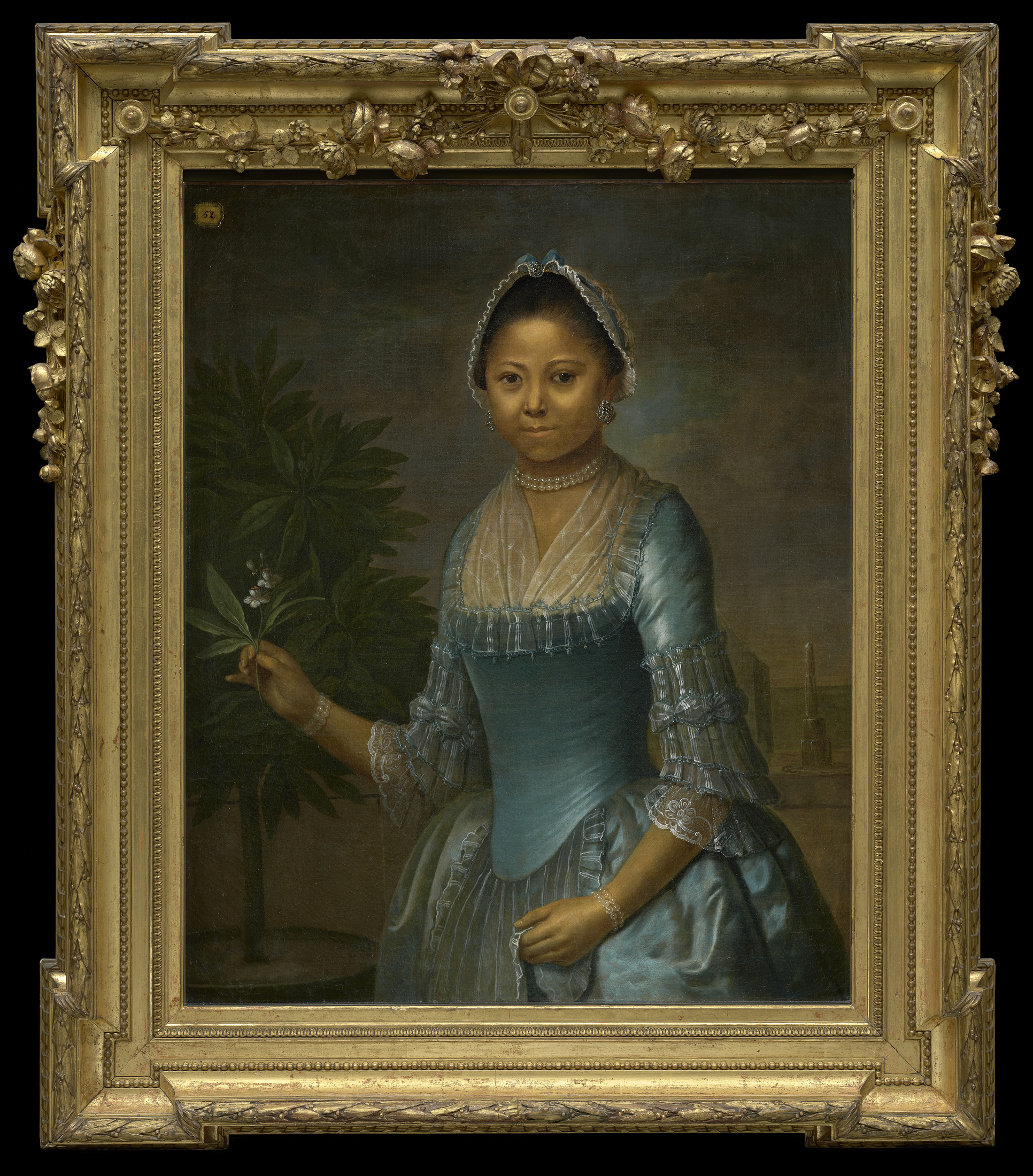
- Artist: Jeremias Schultz
- Year: 1775
- Catalogue: 2019/2437
- Medium: oil on canvas
- Movement: Dutch Golden Age
- Subject: Eleonora Susette, portrait painting
- Dimensions: 80 × 69,2 cm
- Location: Art Gallery of Ontario, Amsterdam, Dutch Republic, Toronto, Canada
- Commissioner: Beata Louise Schultz–de la Sablonière
- Accession: 2019/2437

Portrait of Eleonora Susette is a portrait painting by the Dutch painter Jeremias Schultz (1723–1800), created in 1775. Initially, little was known about the painting when it was acquired by the Art Gallery of Ontario (AGO) in 2020. Both the identity of the sitter and the artist had been lost to time, and the painting bore the general title Portrait of a Lady Holding an Orange Blossom. Following years of research, the sitter was identified as Eleonora Susette, an enslaved woman from the former Dutch colony of Berbice (present-day Guyana).

== Artist ==
Jeremias Schultz (Note: Also spelt as Schultsz, Schulz, and Schultze) (1723–1800) was a Dutch painter, illustrator, and etcher. He was born in Berlin, Germany, in 1723, and around 1743, he moved to Amsterdam, the Netherlands, where he started his painting career. In addition, he was a teacher in the apprenticeship of his cousin, Johan Christoffel Schultsz, and artists P.J. Rink, Arend Alans, and Isaac Cordes Jansz. Schultz's work primarily contained portraits of people from Amsterdam, Deventer, and Kampen. Between 1750 and 1781, he painted several portraits, which can be found with his other works in museum collections worldwide. A portrait of an Armenian merchant in Amsterdam is on display in the San Lazzaro degli Armeni. The works of minister Christiaan Slichtenbree and his wife are part of the collection of Museum De Waag in Deventer.

Other works by Schultz are in the possession of private collectors. More of his works are listed in auction catalogues; however, their current state and whereabouts are unknown. It contains portraits, landscapes, painted wall art, and reproductions of other works in several art forms.

== Research ==
In 2020, the Art Gallery of Ontario (AGO) acquired the portrait of a young woman with funds of the European Curatorial Committee. At that time, the identity of the portrayed woman and the artist were unknown (apart from the barely readable signature "J.Schul...fec" (Note: The same signature "J.Schultz fecit [year]" can also be found on other paintings of Schultz; e.g. Michiel, Christiaan Slichtenbree, Anna Zegerius, Arachiel di Paolo)). Over a number of years, researchers commissioned by the AGO studied the painting in depth, conducting source research and seeking advice from experts in 18th-century European colonial and fashion history, and botany. A major breakthrough came with the rediscovery in an old auction catalogue of a companion portrait of a young man in a rich green suit with a lace cravat (then-known as Portrait of a young man wearing a green jacket holding a cane). The sitter was later identified as Michiel. Progress was shared with the public via the AGO podcast A Portrait of Possibilities, which enabled the museum to gain the attention of the Dutch descendants of the commissioner and helped all the pieces of the puzzle fall into place.

The research revealed that the portrayed sitter was an enslaved woman, with the name Eleonora Susette (sometimes referred to as Johanna). She was born into slavery in 1756 in the then-Dutch colony of Berbice (present-day Guyana). (Note: The colony of Berbice (present-day Guyana) was part of the region Dutch Guiana under the Dutch West India Company (WIC) and the Society of Berbice of Amsterdam, during the Dutch Republic.) Similar to her mother, Lucia Afiba, she was a servant in the Dutch colonial Fort Nassau of Berbice.

== Background ==
In the second half of the 18th century, Eleonora Susette was a servant of the Family Schultz–de la Sablonière, the Dutch governor to Berbice. The family from Kampen departed by ship for Berbice on 20 October 1768, and consisted of governor Stephen Hendrik de la Sablonière (1714–1773), his wife Beata "Bartje" Louise Schultz (1724–1779), (Note: Also spelt as Louisa) and their four children (two sons and two daughters), including son Jacobus "Cootje" Johannes Christoffel. It was highly unusual for European women to travel to the colonies in the West Indies. Beata Louise was descended from a family of Kampen mayors, Schultz–Bruinier, (Note: Also spelt as Brunnier) and is through her father, Ephraïm Schultz, family of painter Jeremias Schultz (her cousin (Note: Their fathers are full brothers (from Berlin))).

Portraits of 1768 commissioned by Schultz–de la Sablonière

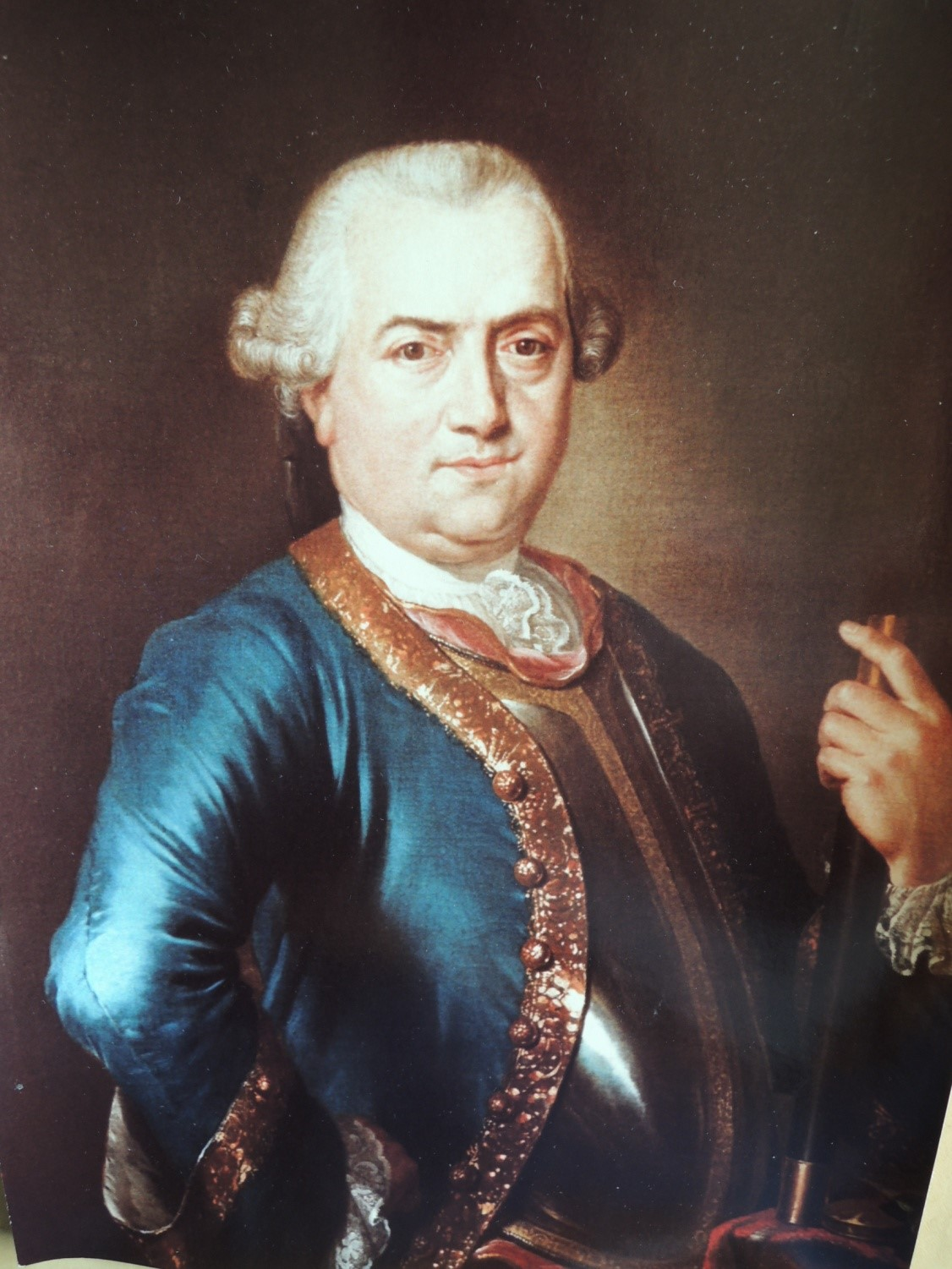
Portrait of Stephen Hendrik de la Sablonière

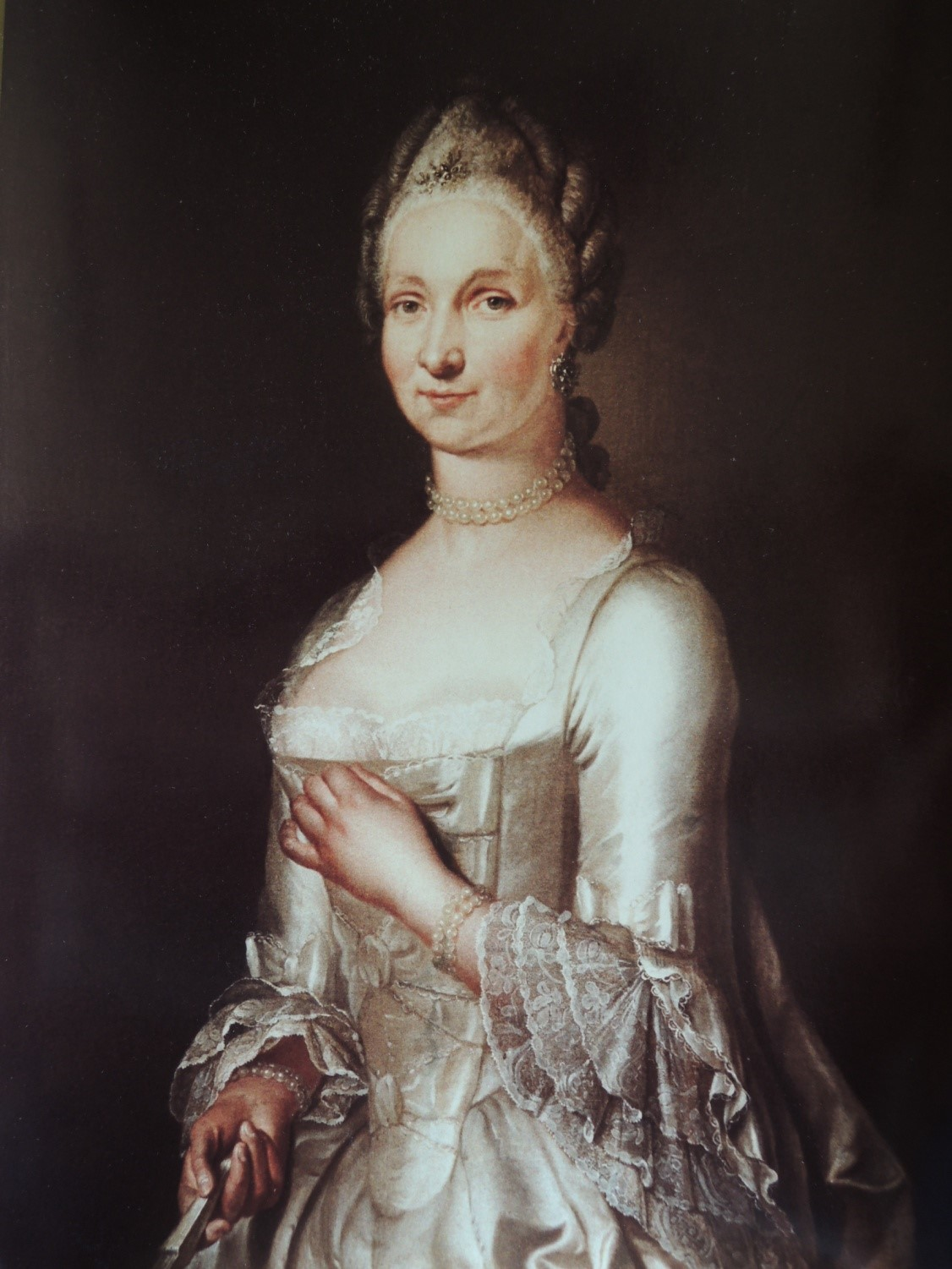
Portrait of Beata Louise Schultz

At that time, Berbice was emerging from a period of unrest. In 1763–64, it was the scene of a large-scale slave rebellion, with a year of occupation and destruction of the plantations. Most plantation owners fled the colony, and only the coastal strip remained in the hands of the colonists. After a split and treason in the rebellion group, and the arrival of military European backup, the uprising was suppressed in a bloody manner, and the colony was reconquered by the colonists. During these events, a total of around 40 of the 346 European colonists and 1,800 of the 3,833 enslaved people of African descent lost their lives in Berbice.

Stephen Hendrik was from 19 March 1768 until his death on 17 July 1773 the governor of Berbice. The oldest son passes away in 1770, and in 1771 daughter Ephraïma "Eefje" Bertha Johanna was born. Son "Cootje" returns in 1772 to back to Kampen for his education. After the death of father Stephen Hendrik and their second oldest daughter in 1773, Beata Louise decides to return with her young daughter to the Netherlands in September 1774. She brings two servants with her; Eleonora Susette and Michiel. She requested permission from the Dutch government for their stay before arrival.

After arriving in Amsterdam, she commissions her cousin Jeremias to portray the two servants, her daughter "Eefje", and son "Cootje" around 1774/'75. The two servants return to Berbice after eight months in April 1775, because within the Netherlands, slavery was illegal, and an enslaved person could free themselves in Dutch court (manumission). This law did not apply to the colonies of the Netherlands, where slavery was legal.

Portraits ca. 1774/'75 commissioned by Schultz–de la Sablonière

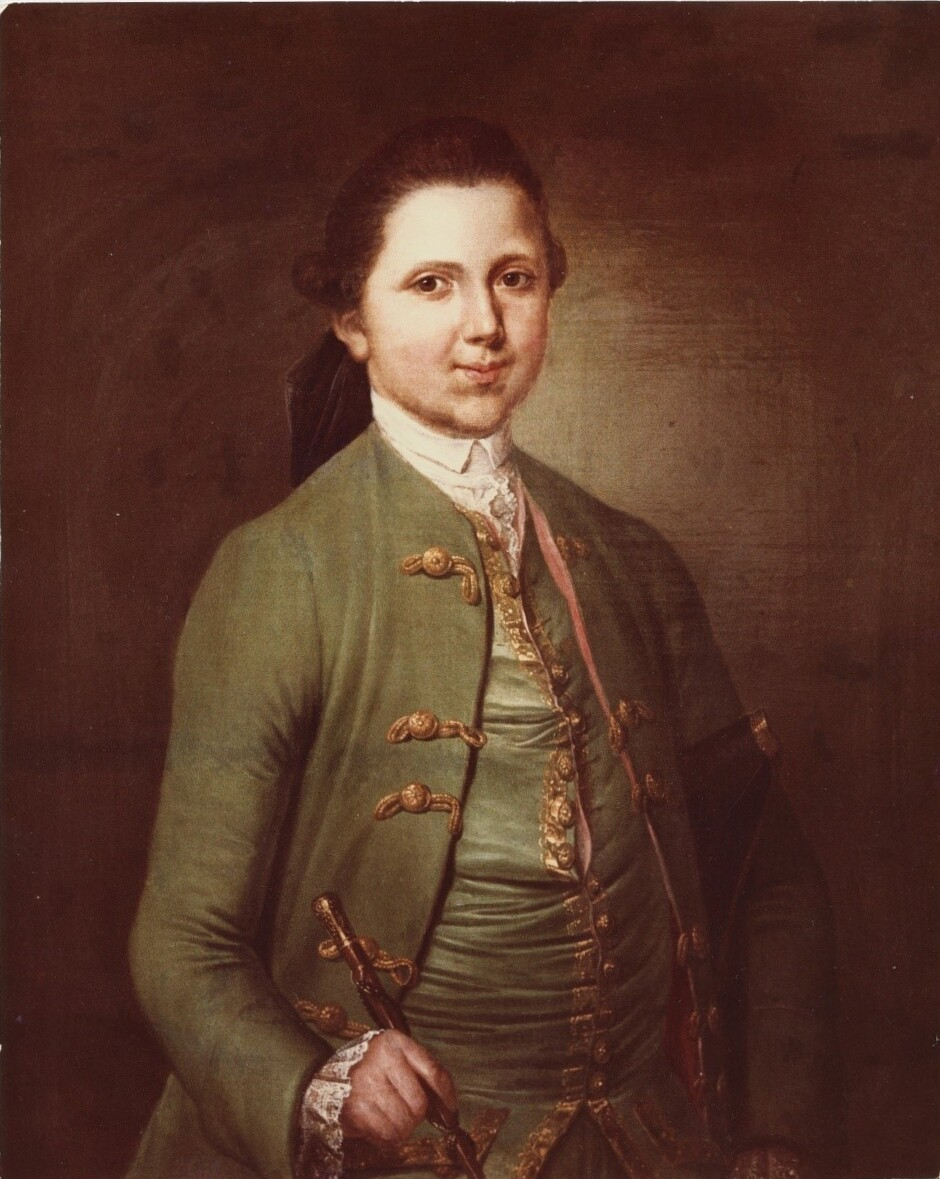
Portrait of Jacobus "Cootje" Johannes Christoffel de la Sablonière

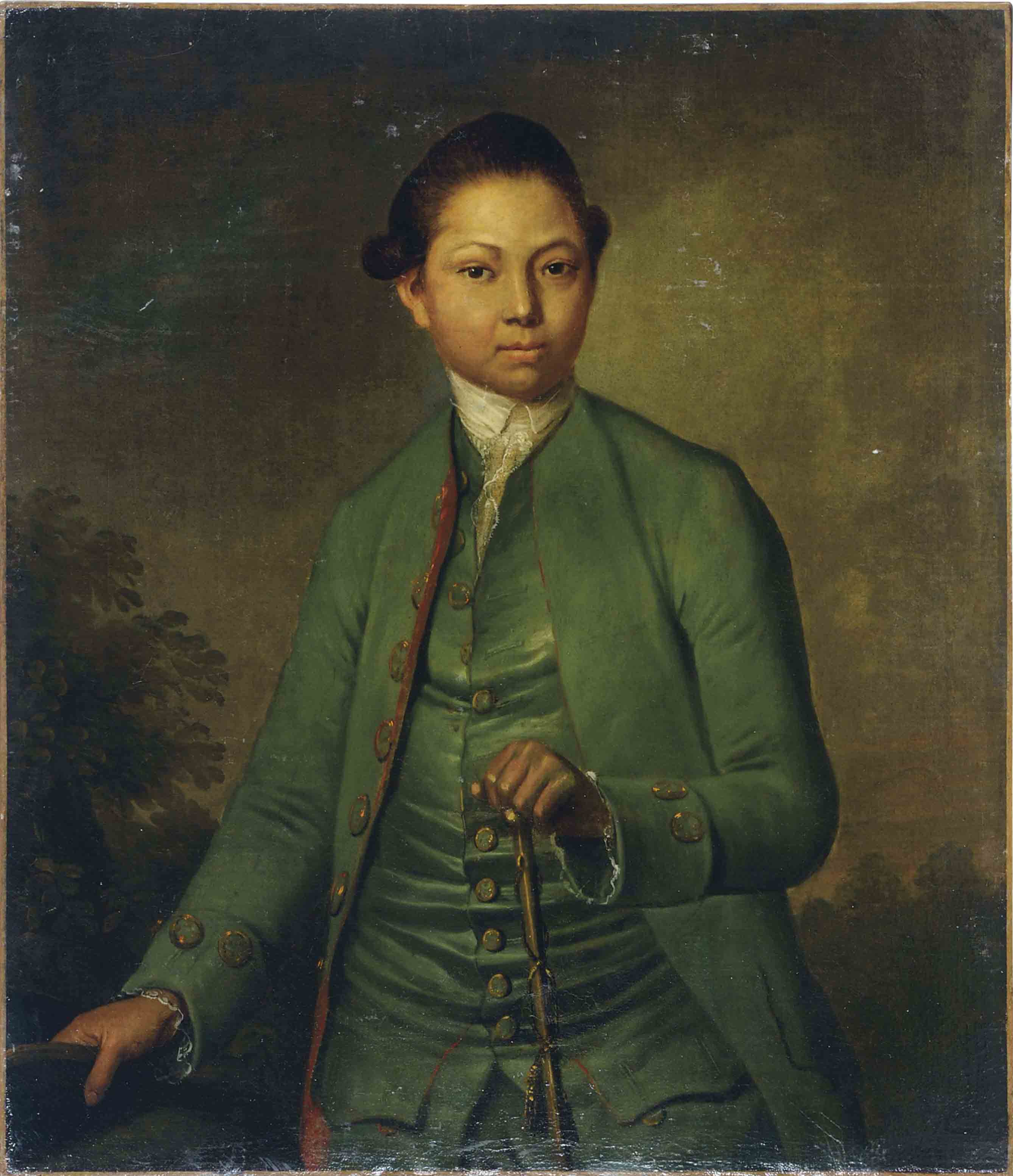
Portrait of Michiel
[oil on canvas, 80 × 68,6 cm]

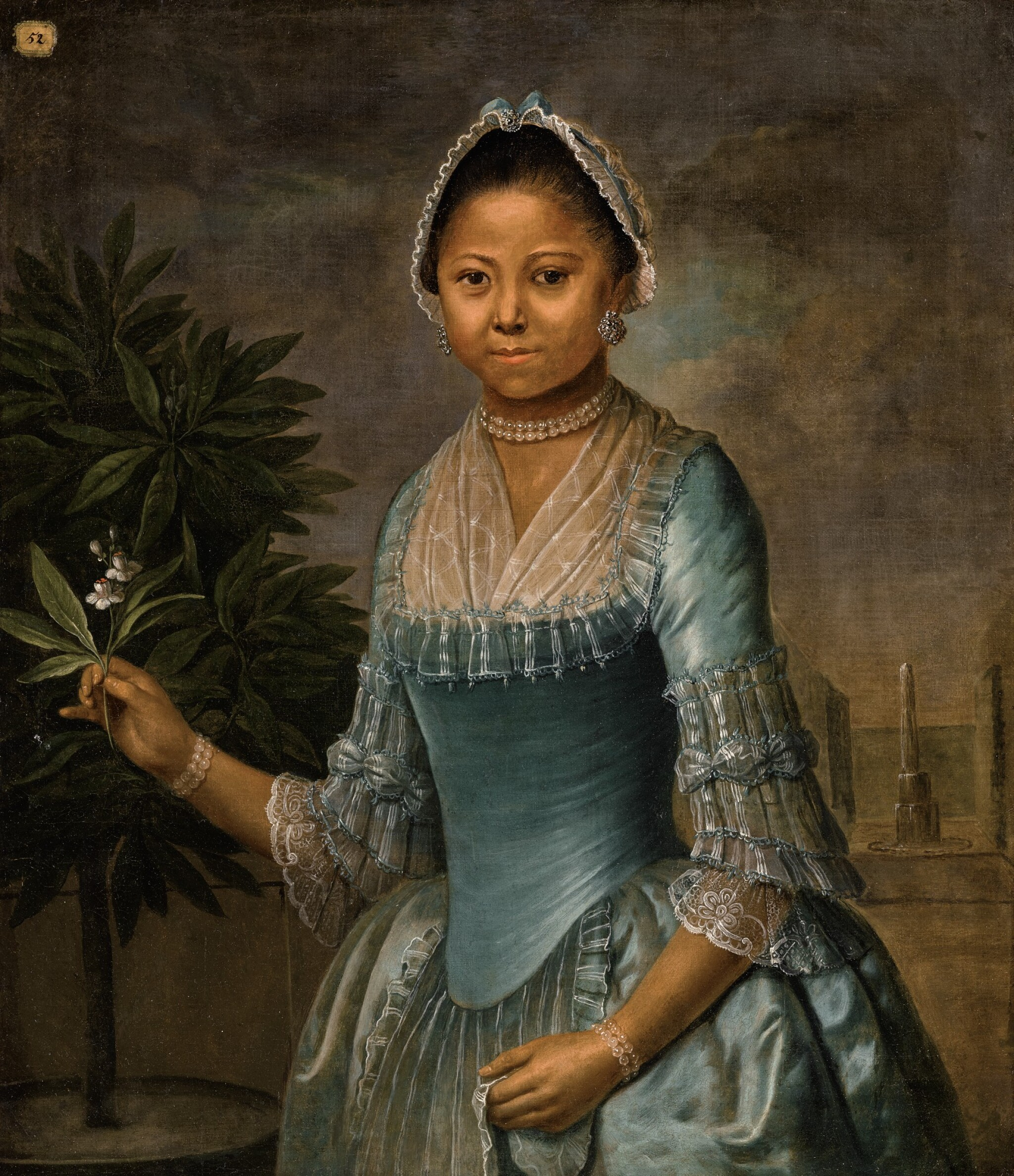
Portrait of Eleonora Susette (1775)
[oil on canvas, 80 × 69,2 cm]

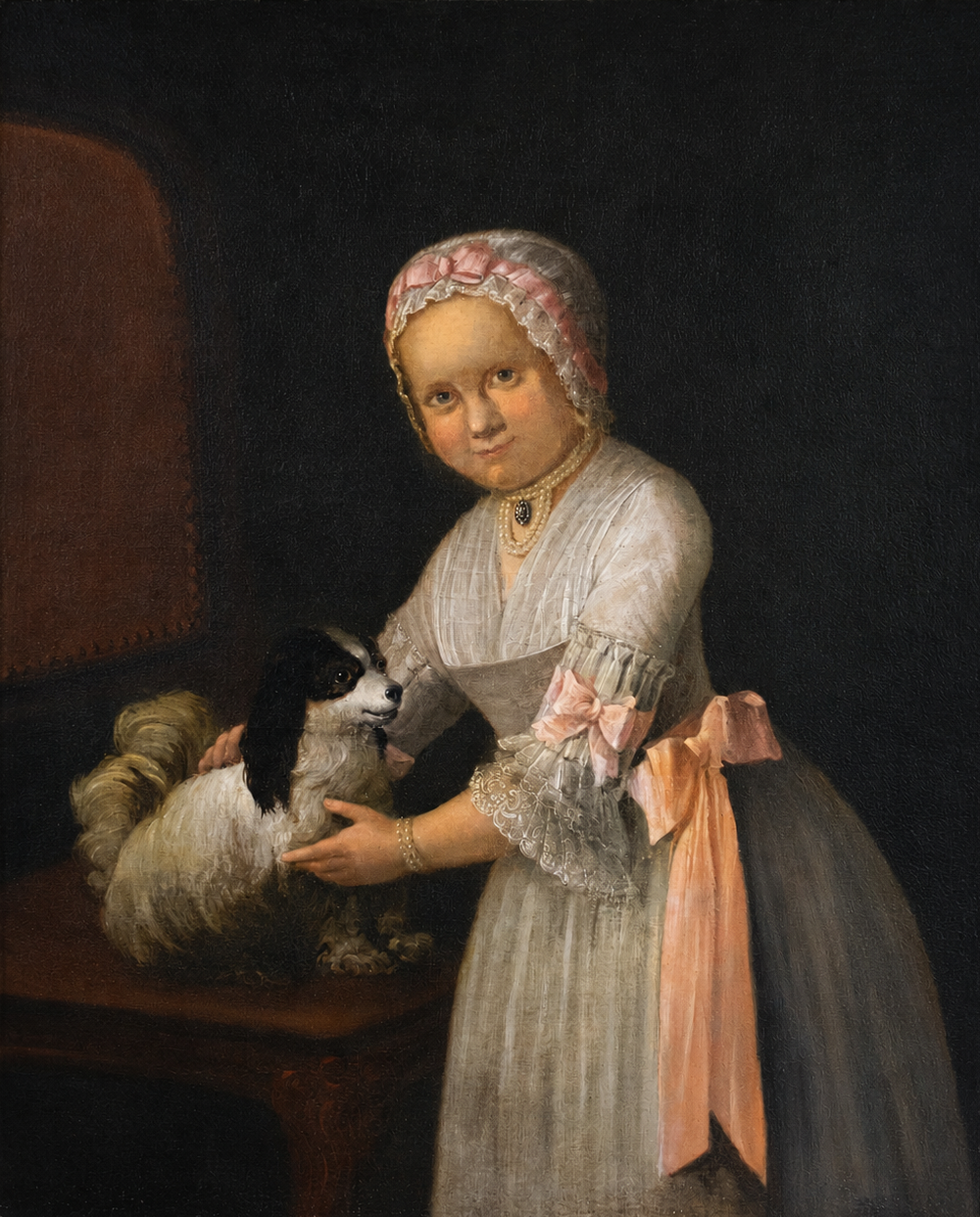
Portrait of Ephraïma "Eefje" Bartha Johanna de la Sablonière

The portrait of Eleonora Susette is on display in the Art Gallery of Ontario. The portrait of Michiel is in unknown private possession. The portraits of Stephen Hendrik de la Sablonière, his wife Beata "Bartje" Louise Schultz, and their son Jacobus "Cootje" Johannes Christoffel are in the possession of their descendants, the Family van den Hoek–Veldjesgraaf from Kampen.
