= Toronto =

Most populous city in Canada

- City (single-tier) and provincial capital
- City of Toronto
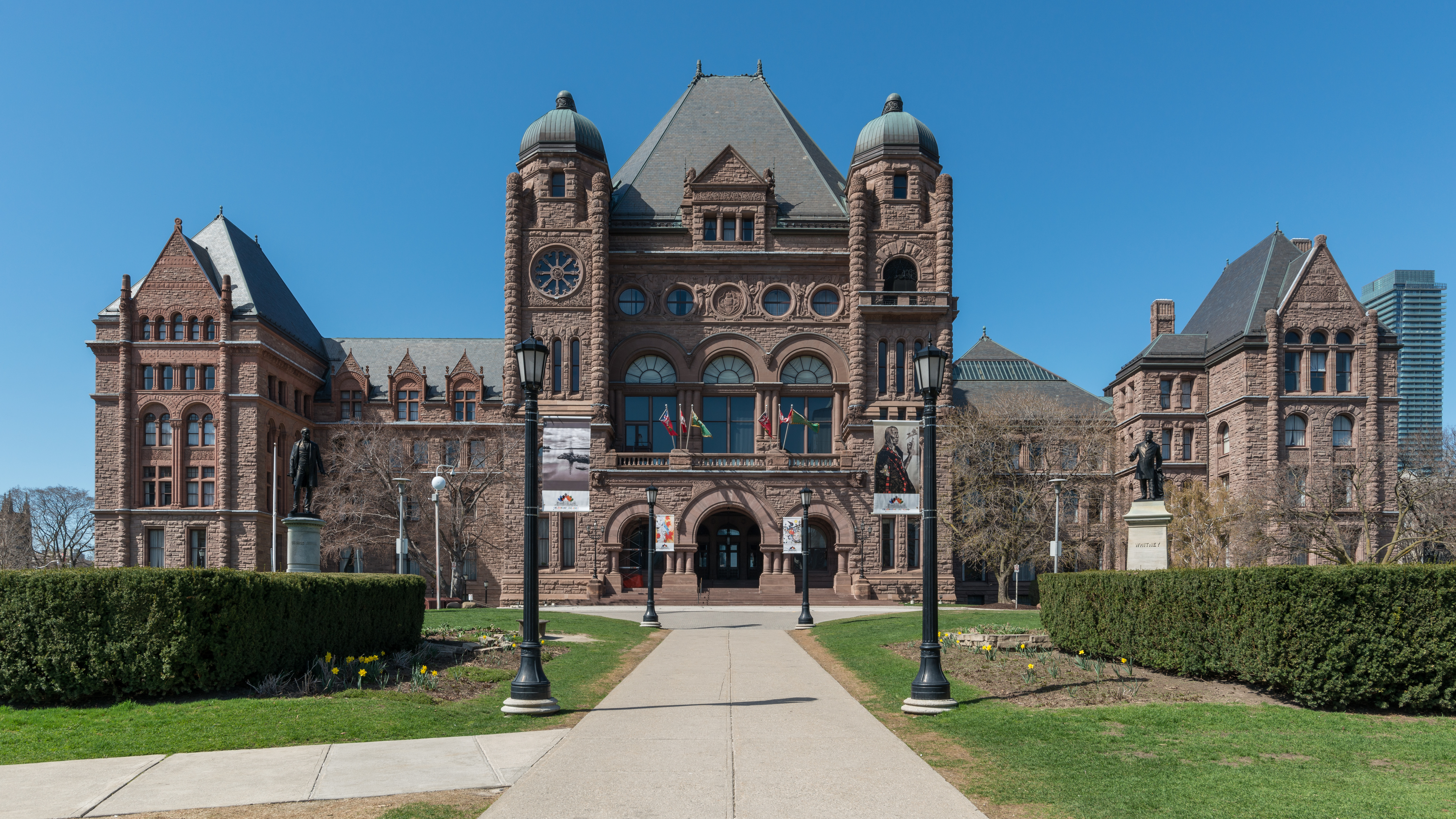
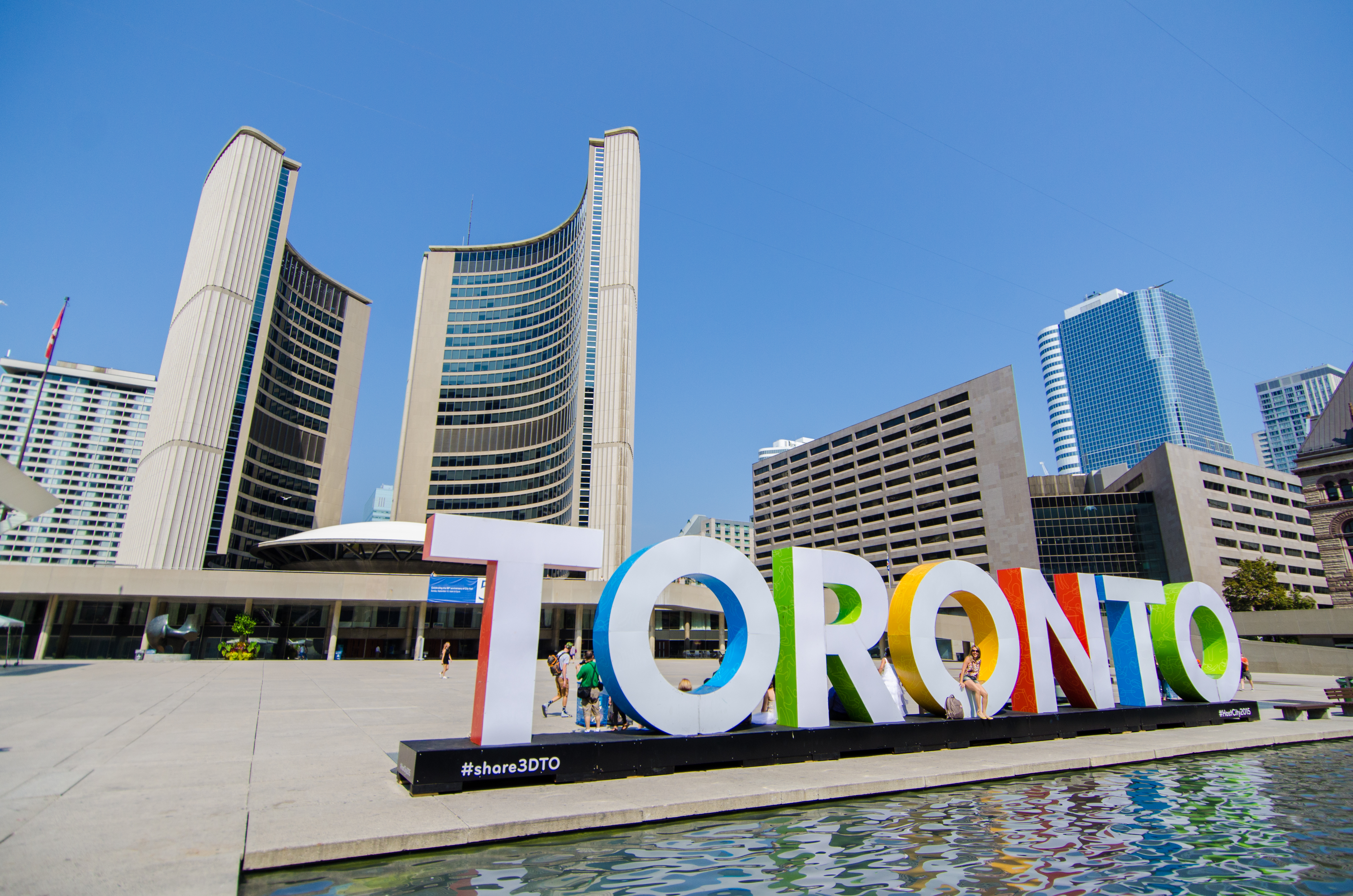
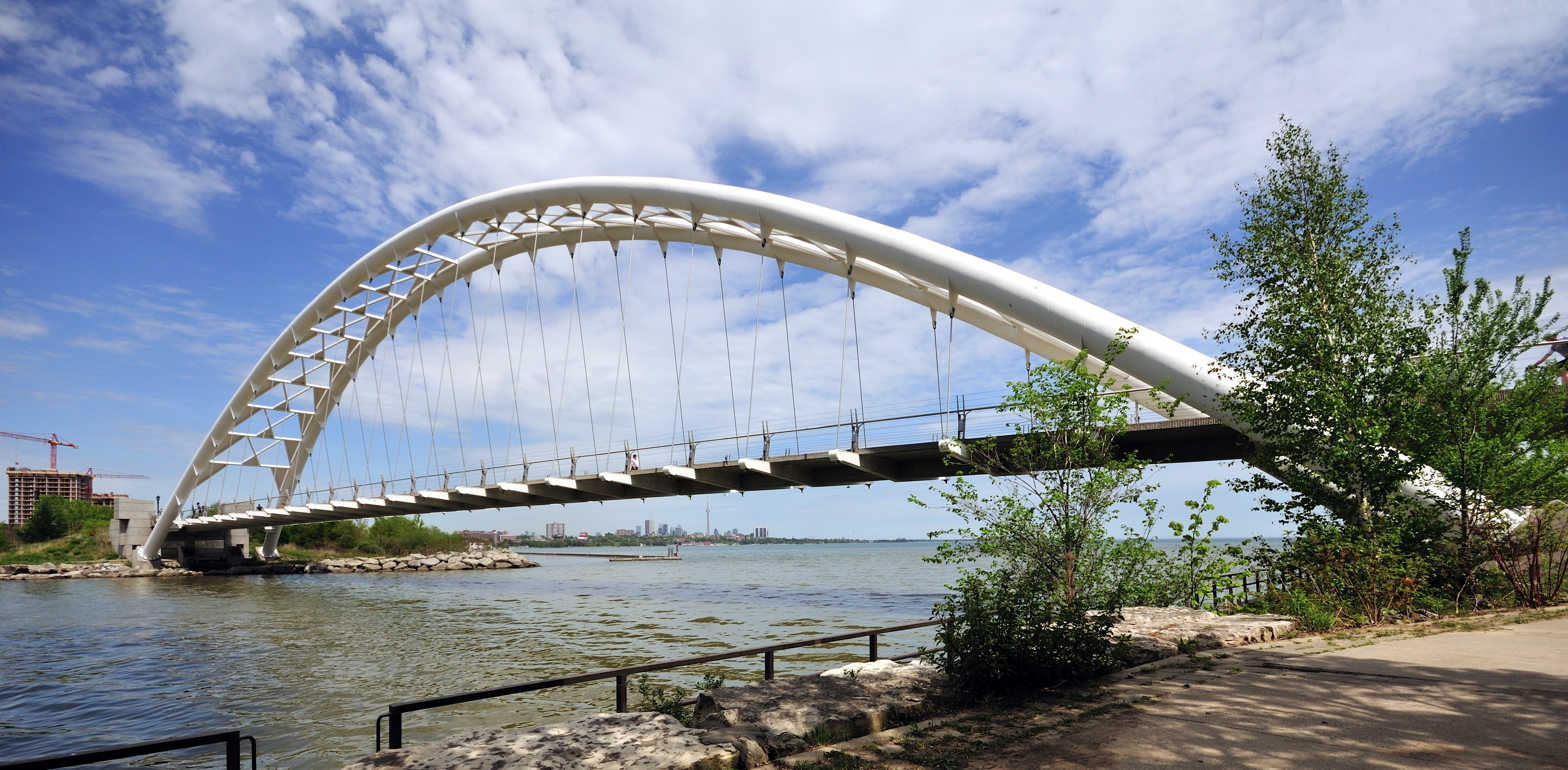
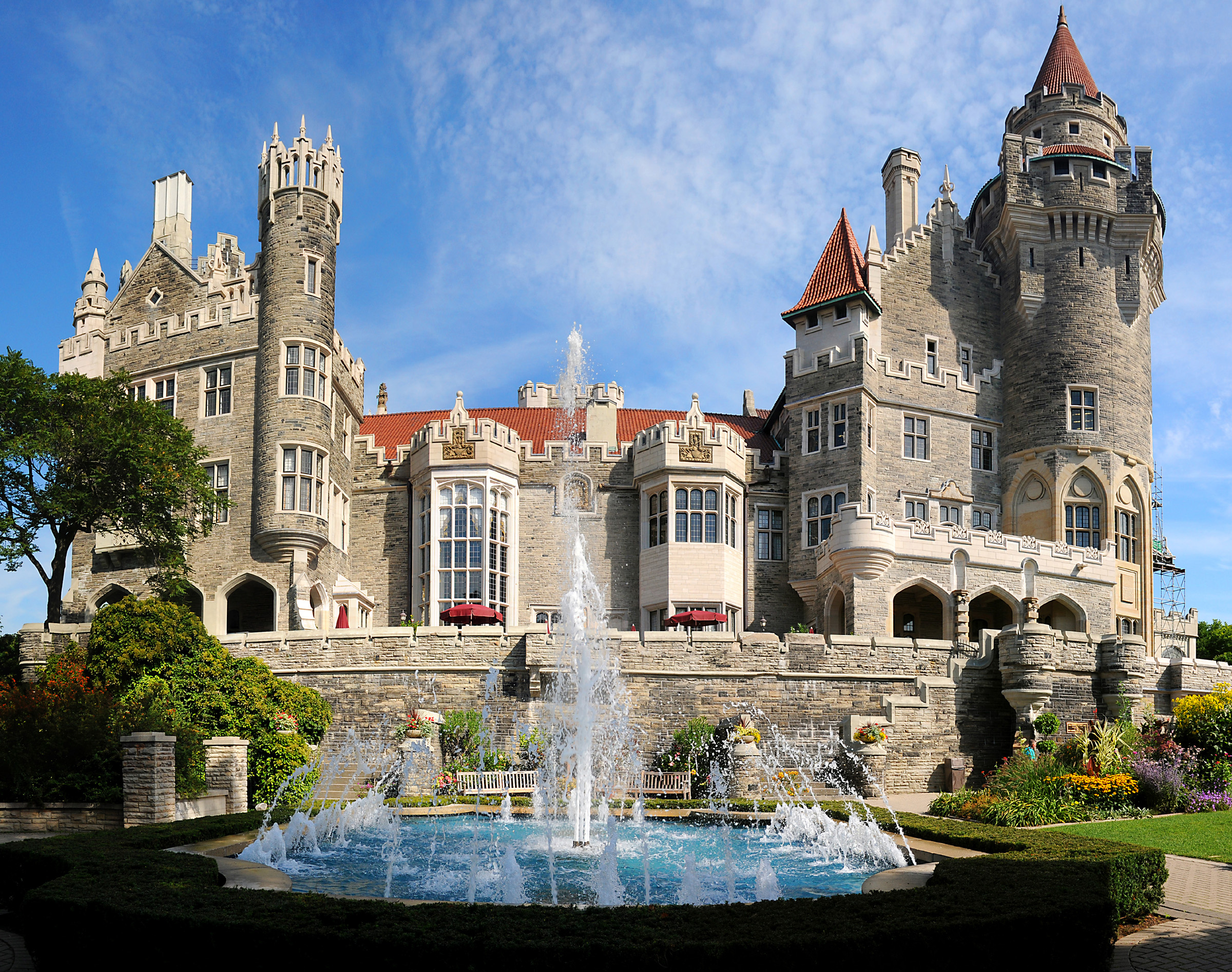
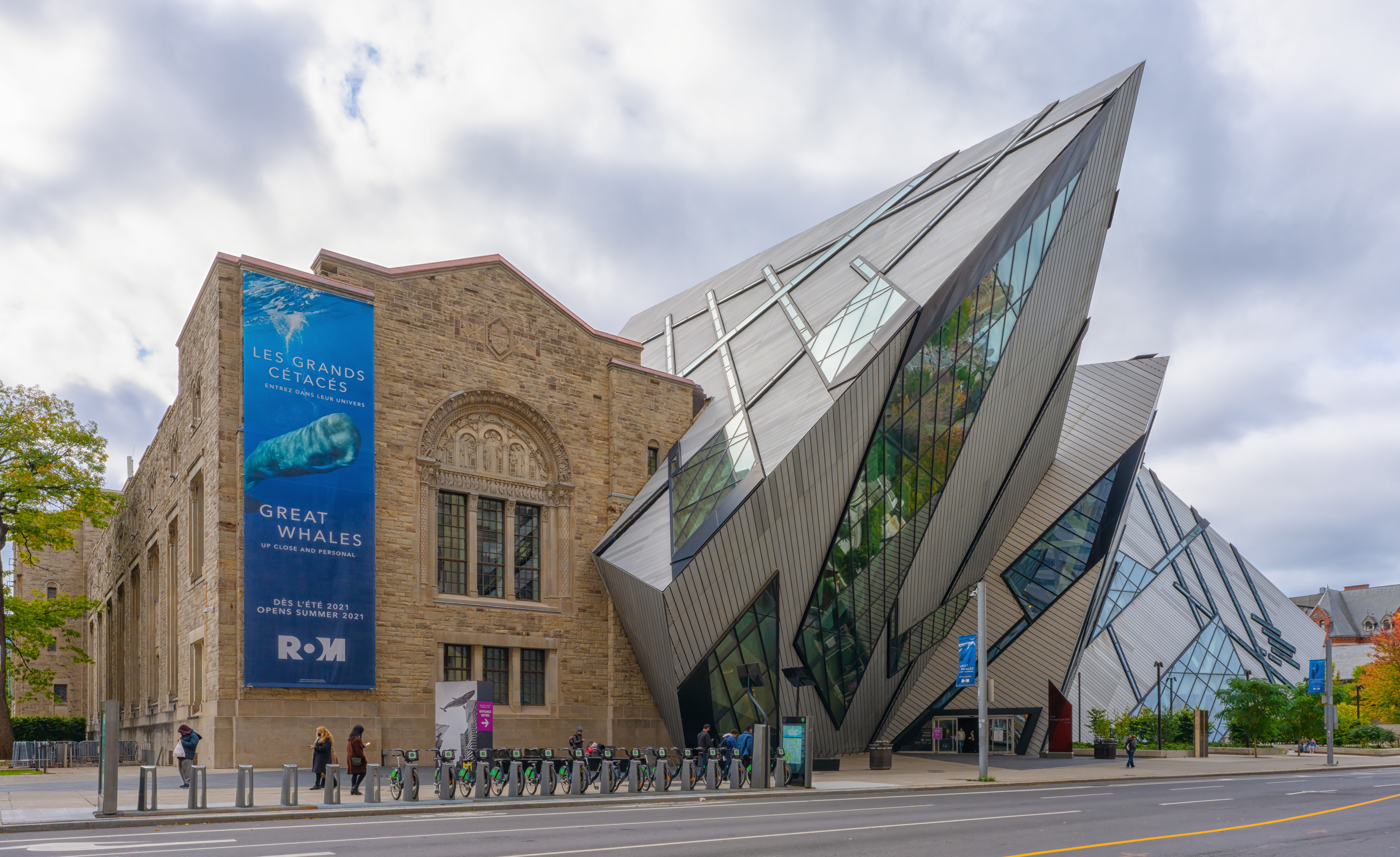
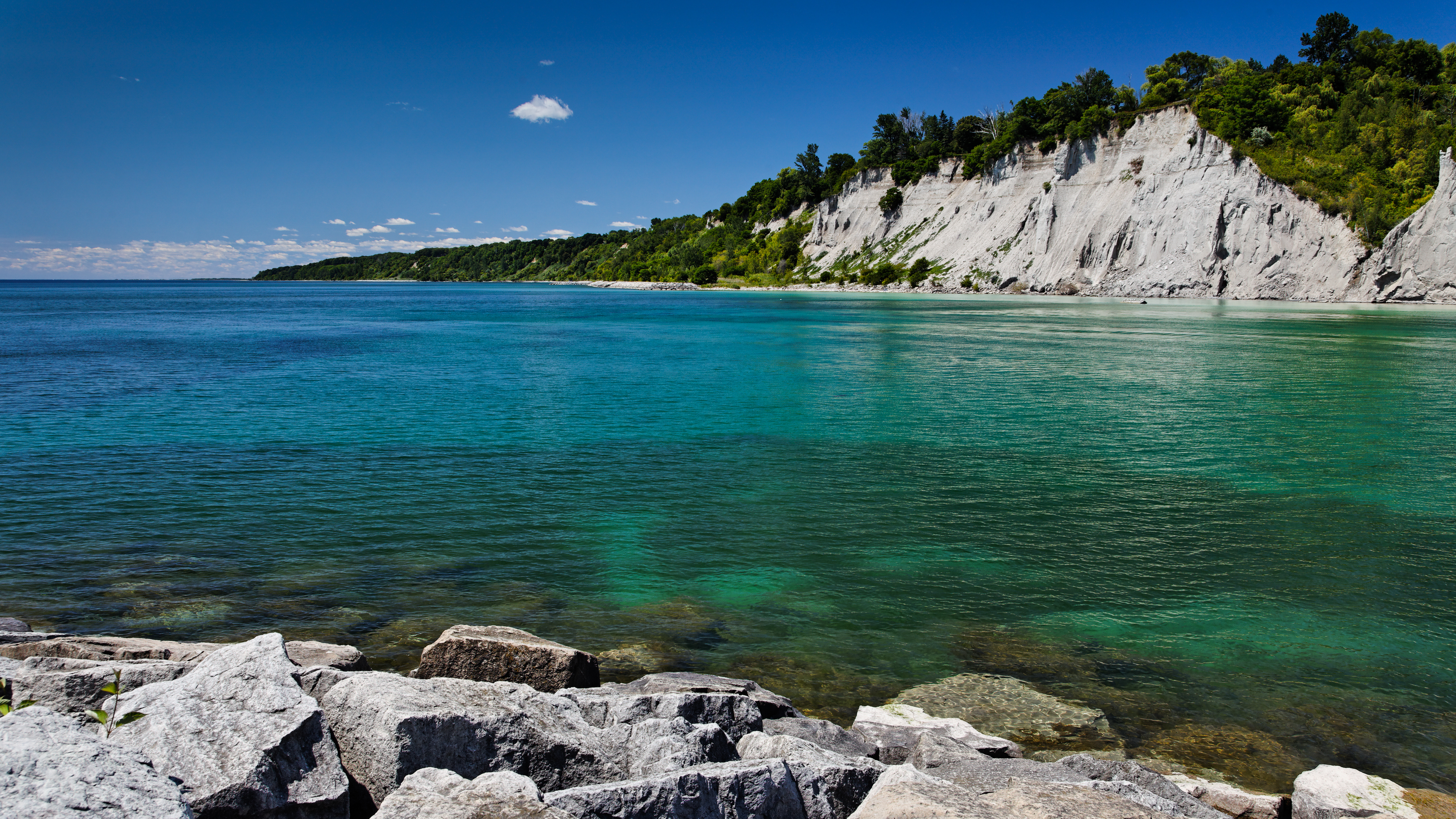
- Skyline of downtown Toronto and the CN Tower Ontario Legislative Building Toronto Sign and City Hall Humber Bay Arch Bridge Casa Loma Royal Ontario Museum Scarborough Bluffs

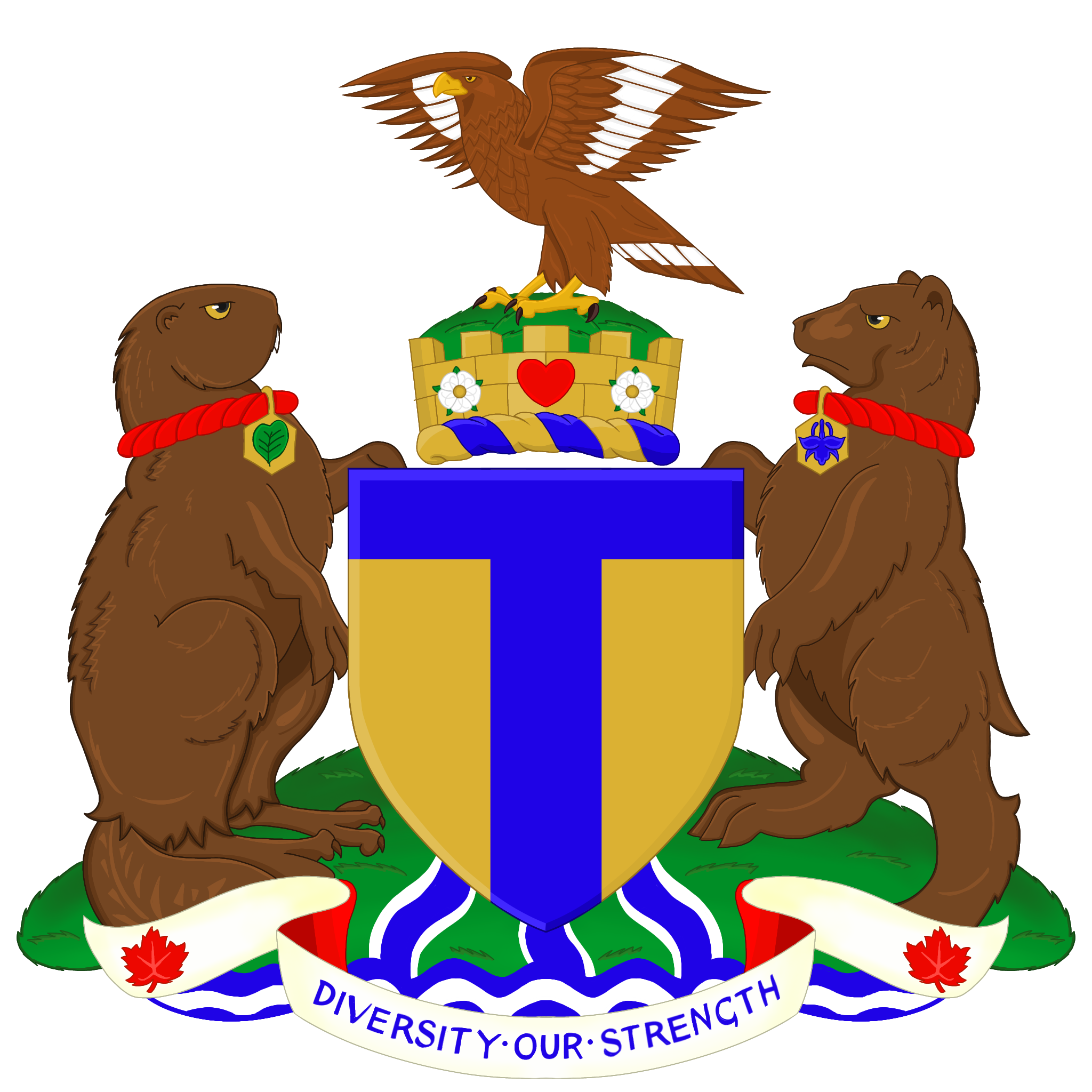
- Flag Coat of arms Logo
- Etymology: From the Mohawk word tkaronto ('tree in the water there'), the name of a channel between Lakes Simcoe and Couchiching
- Nicknames: See list
- Motto: Diversity Our Strength (Note: The motto is typically rendered without punctuation, while the city's coat of arms uses typographical bullets to space the words used in the motto. However, some sources from the municipal government of Toronto use punctuation to describe the motto as "Diversity, Our Strength.")
- Interactive map of Toronto
- Location of Toronto in Ontario Location of Toronto in Canada Location of Toronto in North America
- Coordinates: 43°39′09″N 79°22′54″W
- Country: Canada
- Province: Ontario
- Region: Southern Ontario
- Established: August 27, 1793; 233 years ago (as York)
- Incorporated: March 6, 1834; 192 years ago (as Toronto)
- Changed division: January 20, 1953; 73 years ago (from York County to Metropolitan Toronto)
- Amalgamated: January 1, 1998; 28 years ago
- Communities: East York; Etobicoke; North York; Old Toronto; Scarborough; York

Government
  - Type: Single-tier municipality with a mayor–council system
  - Body: Toronto City Council
  - Mayor: Olivia Chow
  - Statutory Deputy Mayor: Ausma Malik
  - City Manager: Paul Johnson

Area
  - Total: 631.10 km^{2} (243.67 sq mi)
  - Urban: 1,829.05 km^{2} (706.20 sq mi)
  - CMA: 5,902.75 km^{2} (2,279.06 sq mi)
- Lowest elevation: 76.5 m (251 ft)

Population (2021)
  - Total: 2,794,356
  - Estimate (2025): 3,271,830
  - Rank: 1st in Canada; 4th in North America
  - Density: 4,427.8/km^{2} (11,468/sq mi)
  - Urban: 5,647,656
  - CMA: 6,202,225 (1st)
  - Region: 9,765,188
- Demonym: Torontonian

GDP (Nominal, 2022)
  - CMA: CA$522.4 billion
  - Per capita: CA$79,249
- Time zone: UTC−05:00 (EST)
  - Summer (DST): UTC−04:00 (EDT)
- Postal code span: M
- Area codes: 416, 647, 437, 942
- Climate: Hot-summer humid continental climate (Dfa) (Note: Warm-summer (Dfb) before climate change)
- Website: www.toronto.ca

Toronto (Note: /təˈrɒntoʊ/ tə-RON-toh; locally [təˈɹɒnoʊ] tə-RON-oh, also [ˈtɹɒnoʊ] TRON-oh) is the most populous city in Canada and the capital city of the Canadian province of Ontario. It is located on a harbour at the northwestern shore of Lake Ontario. The city is the fourth-most populous city in North America, behind Mexico City, New York City, and Los Angeles, with a census population of 2,794,356 as of 2021. The Greater Toronto Area (GTA) is constituted of Toronto proper and four surrounding regions, Peel, York, Durham, and Halton, and has a population of 6,712,341, while the Toronto census metropolitan area (CMA), with a somewhat different definition, has a population of 7,106,379. Toronto is an international centre of business, finance, arts, sports, and culture, and is recognized as one of the most multicultural and cosmopolitan cities in the world.

Indigenous peoples have inhabited the Toronto area, located on a broad sloping plateau interspersed with rivers, deep ravines, and urban forest, for more than 10,000 years. After the broadly disputed Toronto Purchase, when the Mississaugas surrendered the area to the British Crown, the British established the town of York in 1793 and later designated it as the capital of Upper Canada. During the War of 1812, the town was the site of the Battle of York, resulting in heavy damage and a two-week occupation by American troops. York was renamed and incorporated in 1834 as the City of Toronto. It was designated as the capital of the province of Ontario in 1867 during Canadian Confederation. Toronto's city proper has since expanded past its original limits through both annexation and amalgamation to its current area of 631 square kilometres (244 sq mi) in 1998.

The diverse population of Toronto reflects its current and historical role as an important destination for immigrants to Canada. About half of its residents were born outside of Canada and over 200 ethnic origins are represented among its inhabitants. While the majority of Torontonians speak English as their primary language, over 160 languages are spoken in the city. The city is governed by Toronto City Council, a unicameral body whose members are elected every four years. City council is composed of 25 councillors, who each represent a geographical ward, and the mayor of Toronto who serves as head of council and the chief executive officer of the municipal government.

Toronto is Canada's largest financial centre, and is home to the Toronto Stock Exchange, the de facto operational headquarters of Canada's five largest banks, and the headquarters of many large Canadian and multinational corporations. Its economy is highly diversified with strengths in technology, design, financial services, life sciences, education, arts, fashion, aerospace, environmental innovation, food services, and tourism. Toronto is a prominent centre for music, theatre, motion picture production, television production, and digital media production, and is home to the headquarters of Canada's major national broadcast networks and media outlets. Its varied cultural institutions, which include numerous museums and galleries, festivals and public events, entertainment districts, national historic sites, and sports activities, attract over 26 million visitors each year.

== Etymology ==
The name Toronto has been recorded with various spellings in French and English, including Tarento, Tarontha, Taronto, Toranto, Torento, Toronto, and Toronton. The most frequent early spelling, Taronto, referred to "The Narrows", a channel of water through which Lake Simcoe discharges into Lake Couchiching where the Wendat had planted tree saplings to corral fish at what is now the Mnjikaning Fish Weirs site in Orillia. This narrows was called tkaronto by the Mohawk, meaning 'where there are trees standing in the water', and was recorded as early as 1615 by Samuel de Champlain. The word Toronto, meaning 'plenty', also appears in a 1632 French lexicon of the Wendat language, which is also an Iroquoian language. Toronto also appears on French maps referring to various locations, including Georgian Bay, Lake Simcoe, and several rivers. A portage route from Lake Ontario to Lake Huron running through this point, known as the "Toronto Carrying-Place Trail", led to widespread use of the name.

== History ==
=== Early history ===
Archaeological sites show evidence of human occupation in the site that would later become Toronto dating back thousands of years. The Wendat, an Iroquoian-speaking agricultural people, occupied and farmed the territory that would become Toronto for centuries from pre-European contact until the invasion and massacre by the Haudenosaunee, another Iroquoian-speaking agricultural people, from the south side of Lake Ontario between 1648 and 1650. By the 1660s, the Haudenosaunee established two villages within what is today Toronto, Ganatsekwyagon (Bead Hill) on the banks of the Rouge River and Teiaiagon on the banks of the Humber River. By 1701, the Mississaugas, an Anishinaabe-speaking hunter-gatherer people from Northern Ontario, had displaced the Haudenosaunee, who abandoned the Toronto area at the end of the Beaver Wars, with most returning to their homeland in present-day New York state.

French traders founded Fort Rouillé in 1750 (the current Exhibition grounds were later developed there), but abandoned it in 1759 during the Seven Years' War. The British defeated the French and their indigenous allies in the war, and the area became part of the British colony of Quebec in 1763.

During the American Revolutionary War, an influx of British settlers arrived there as United Empire Loyalists fled for the British-controlled lands north of Lake Ontario. The Crown granted them land to compensate for their losses in the Thirteen Colonies. The new province of Upper Canada was being created and needed a capital. In 1787, the British Lord Dorchester arranged for the Toronto Purchase with the Mississaugas of the New Credit First Nation, thereby securing more than a quarter of a million acres (1000 km^{2}) of land in the Toronto area. Dorchester intended the location to be named Toronto. The first 25 years after the Toronto purchase were quiet, although "there were occasional independent fur traders" present in the area, with the usual complaints of debauchery and drunkenness.

=== Town of York (1793–1834) ===
In 1793, Governor John Graves Simcoe established the town of York on the Toronto Purchase lands, naming it after Prince Frederick, Duke of York and Albany. Simcoe decided to move the Upper Canada capital from Newark (Niagara-on-the-Lake) to York, believing the new site would be less vulnerable to attack by the United States. The York garrison was built at the entrance of the town's natural harbour, sheltered by a long sand-bar peninsula. The town's settlement formed at the harbour's eastern end behind the peninsula, near the present-day intersection of Parliament Street and Front Street (in the "Old Town" area).

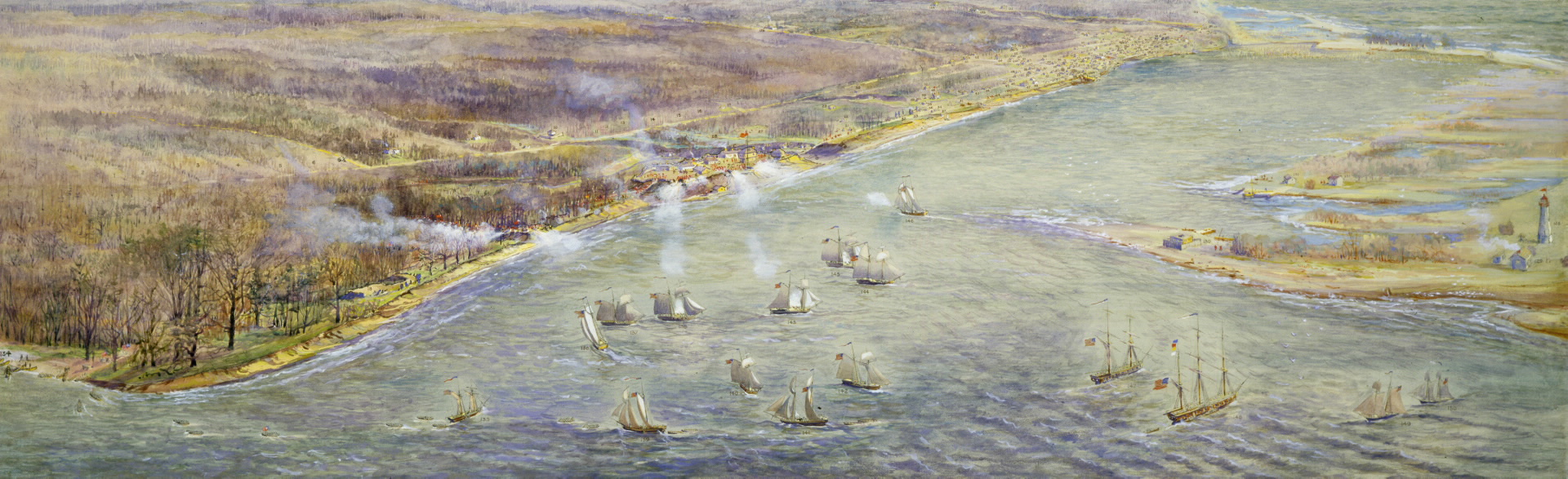
An American squadron exchanging fire with Fort York during the Battle of York, 1813. The American landing is depicted to the west (left foreground).

In 1813, as part of the War of 1812, the Battle of York ended in the town's capture and plunder by United States forces. John Strachan negotiated the town's surrender. American soldiers destroyed much of the garrison and set fire to the parliament buildings during their five-day occupation. Because of the sacking of York, British troops retaliated later in the war with the burning of Washington, D.C.

The University of Toronto, then known as King's College, was established in 1827 as the first institution of higher education in Upper Canada.

=== Incorporation and development (1834–1954) ===
York was incorporated as the "City of Toronto" on March 6, 1834, adopting the Indigenous name. Reformist politician William Lyon Mackenzie became the first mayor of Toronto. Mackenzie would later lead the unsuccessful Upper Canada Rebellion of 1837 against the British colonial government.

Toronto's population of 9,000 included some African-American slaves, some of whom had been brought by the Loyalists, and Black Loyalists, whom the Crown had freed (most of the latter were resettled in Nova Scotia). By 1834, refugee slaves from America's South were also immigrating to Toronto to gain freedom. Slavery was banned outright in Upper Canada (and throughout the British Empire) in 1834. Torontonians integrated people of colour into their society. In the 1840s, an eating house at Frederick and King Streets, a place of mercantile prosperity in the early city, was operated by a black man named Bloxom.

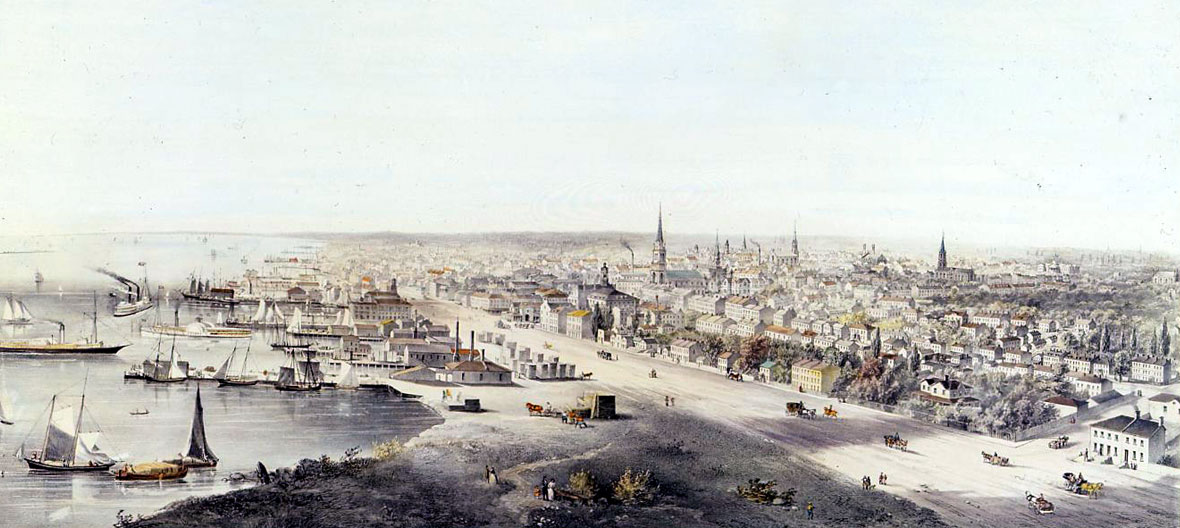
Toronto in 1854. The city was a major destination for immigrants to Canada in the second half of the 19th century.

As a major destination for immigrants to Canada, the city grew rapidly through the remainder of the 19th century. The first significant wave of immigrants were Irish, fleeing the Great Irish Famine; most of them were Catholic. By 1851, the Irish-born population had become the largest single ethnic group in the city. The Scottish and English population welcomed smaller numbers of Protestant Irish immigrants, some from what is now Northern Ireland, which gave the Orange Order significant and long-lasting influence over Toronto society. Almost every mayor of Toronto was a member of the Orange Order between 1850 and 1950, and the city was sometimes referred to as the "Belfast of Canada" because of Orange influence in municipal politics and administration.

For brief periods, Toronto was twice the capital of the united Province of Canada: first from 1849 to 1851, following unrest in Montreal, and later from 1855 to 1859. After this date, Quebec was designated as the capital until 1865 (two years before Canadian Confederation). Since then, the capital of Canada has remained as Ottawa, Ontario.

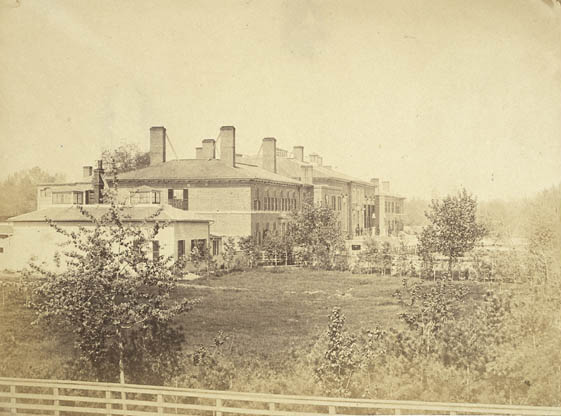
The third Parliament of Upper Canada building on Front Street, 1856

Toronto became the capital of the province of Ontario after its official creation in 1867. The seat of government of Ontario briefly returned to the same building that had served as the Third Parliament Building of Upper Canada, before moving to the Ontario Legislative Building at Queen's Park in 1893. Because of its provincial capital status, the city was also the location of Government House, the residence of the viceregal representative of the Crown in right of Ontario.

Long before the Royal Military College of Canada was established in 1876, supporters of the concept proposed military colleges in Canada. Staffed by British Regulars, adult male students underwent a three-month-long military course at the School of Military Instruction in Toronto. Established by Militia General Order in 1864, the school enabled officers of militia or candidates for commission or promotion in the Militia to learn military duties, drill and discipline, to command a company at Battalion Drill, to drill a company at Company Drill, the internal economy of a company, and the duties of a company's officer. The school was retained at Confederation, in 1867. In 1868, schools of cavalry and artillery instruction were formed in Toronto.

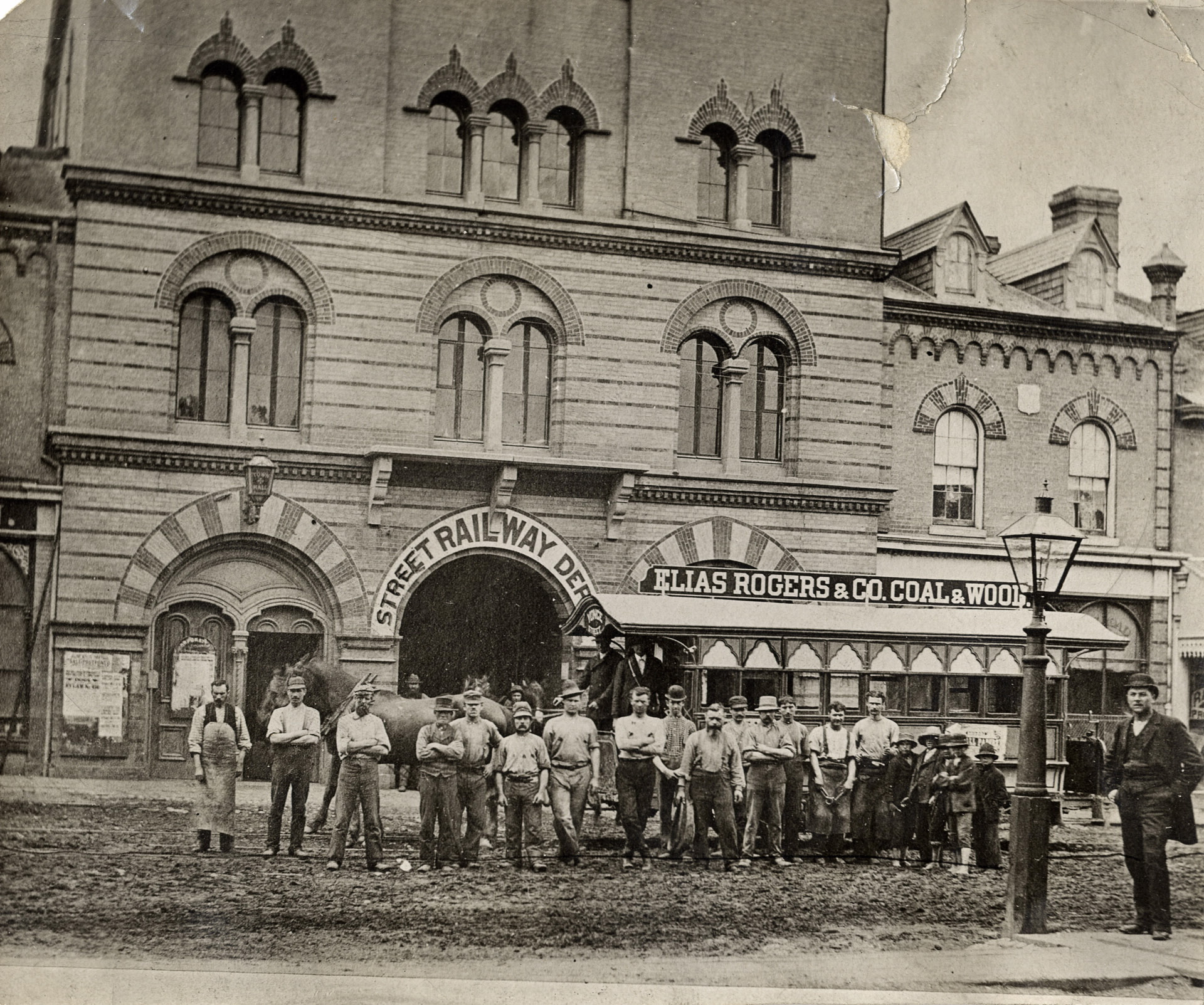
A group in front of a horse-drawn streetcar in front of Yorkville Town Hall 1870. A gas streetlamp is visible in the right foreground.

In the 19th century, the city built an extensive sewage system to improve sanitation, and streets were illuminated with gas lighting as a regular service. Long-distance railway lines were constructed, including a route completed in 1854 linking Toronto with the Upper Great Lakes. The Grand Trunk Railway and the Northern Railway of Canada joined in the building of the first Union Station downtown. The advent of the railway dramatically increased the numbers of immigrants arriving, commerce and industry, as had the Lake Ontario steamers and schooners entering port before. These enabled Toronto to become a major gateway linking the world to the interior of the North American continent. Expanding port and rail facilities brought in northern timber for export and imported Pennsylvania coal. Industry dominated the waterfront for the next 100 years.

During the late 19th century, Toronto became the largest alcohol distillation (in particular, spirits) centre in North America. A distillery built by Gooderham and Worts from 1859 to 1861 became the country's largest whisky factory. While the factory has since closed, its buildings have been designated a National Historic Site and have been converted into the Distillery District. The harbour allowed access to grain and sugar imports used in processing.

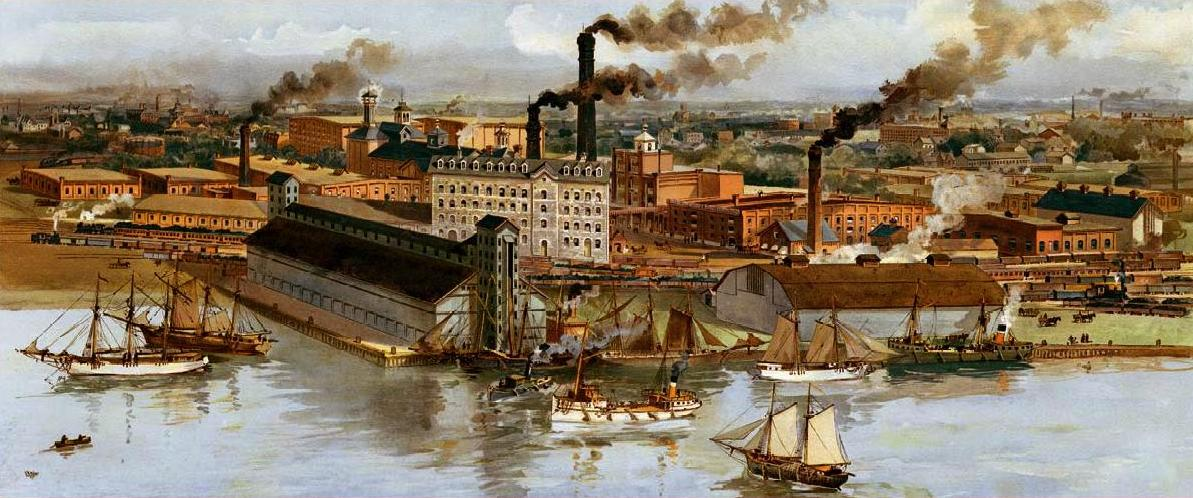
The Gooderham and Worts buildings, 1896

Horse-drawn streetcars gave way to electric streetcars in 1891 when the city granted the operation of the transit franchise to the Toronto Railway Company. The public transit system passed into public ownership in 1921 as the Toronto Transportation Commission, later renamed the Toronto Transit Commission. The system now has the third-highest ridership of any city public transportation system in North America.

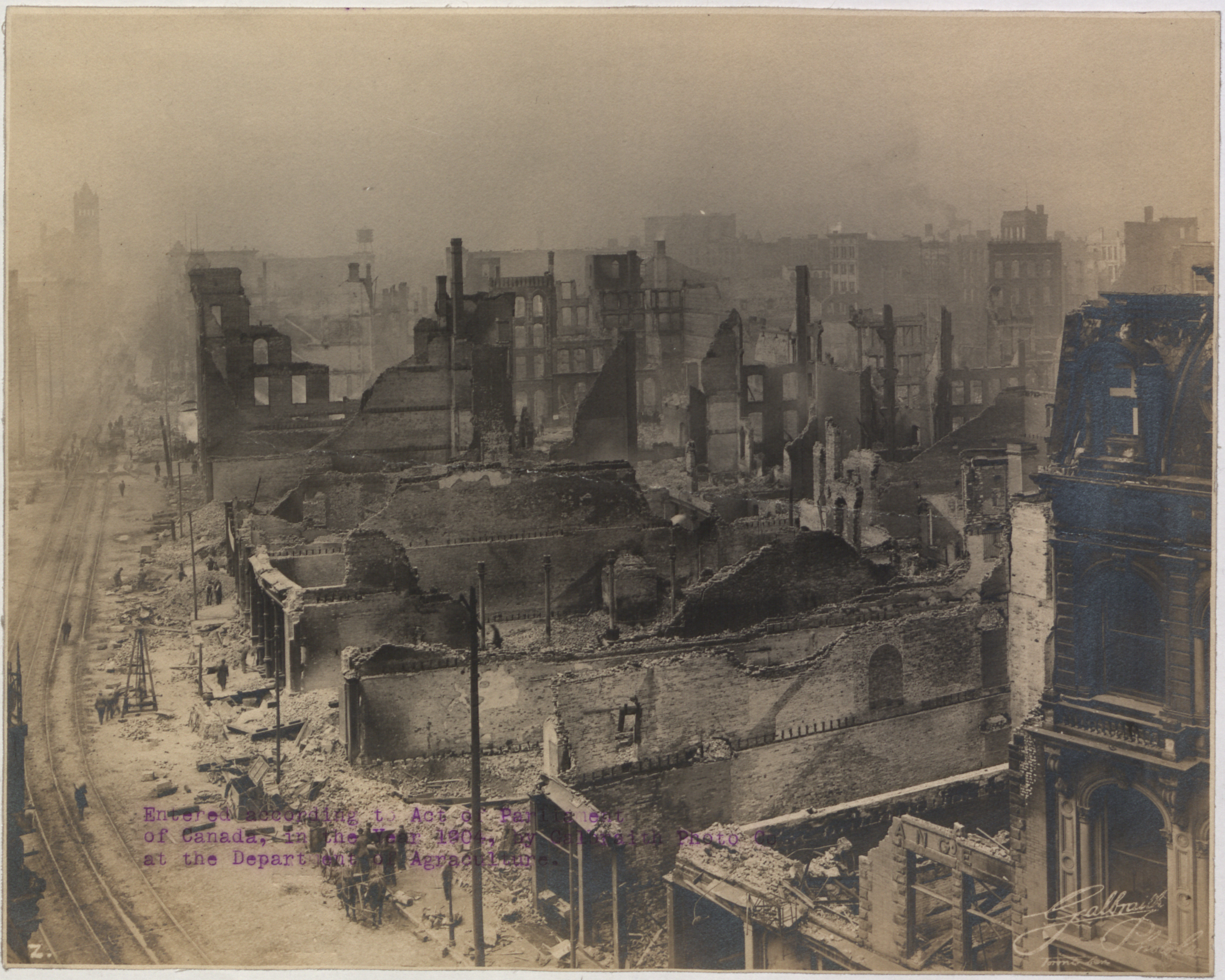
Ruins on Front Street after the Great Toronto Fire of 1904

The Great Toronto Fire of 1904 destroyed a large section of downtown Toronto. The fire destroyed more than 100 buildings. The fire claimed one victim, John Croft, who was an explosive expert clearing the ruins from the fire. It caused CA$10,387,000 (equivalent to $390,356,450 in 2025) in damage.

The city received new European immigrant groups from the late 19th century into the early 20th century, particularly Germans, French, Italians, and Jews. They were soon followed by Russians, Poles, and other Eastern European nations, in addition to the Chinese entering from the West. Like the Irish before them, many of these migrants lived in overcrowded shanty-type slums, such as "the Ward", which was centred on Bay Street, now the heart of the country's Financial District.

As new migrants began to prosper, they moved to better housing in other areas, in what is now understood to be succession waves of settlement. Despite its fast-paced growth, by the 1920s, Toronto's population and economic importance in Canada remained second to the much longer established Montreal, Quebec. However, by 1934, the Toronto Stock Exchange had become the largest in the country.

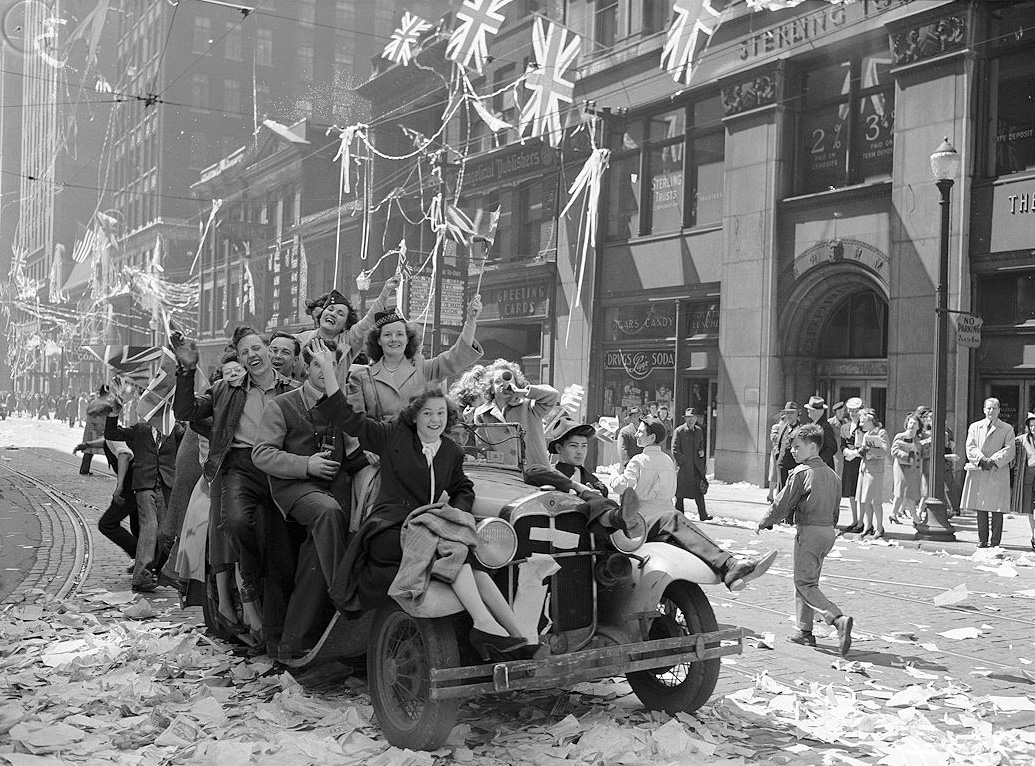
People in Toronto celebrating the Victory in Europe, May 1945

=== Metro era (1954–1997) ===
In 1954, the City of Toronto and 12 surrounding municipalities were federated into a regional government known as Metropolitan Toronto. The postwar boom had resulted in rapid suburban development. It was believed a coordinated land-use strategy and shared services would provide greater efficiency for the region. The metropolitan government began to manage services that crossed municipal boundaries, including highways, police services, water and public transit. In that year, a half-century after the Great Fire of 1904, disaster struck the city again when Hurricane Hazel brought intense winds and flash flooding. In the Toronto area, 81 people were killed, nearly 1,900 families were left homeless, and the hurricane caused more than CA$25,000,000 (equivalent to $291,134,752 in 2025) in damage.

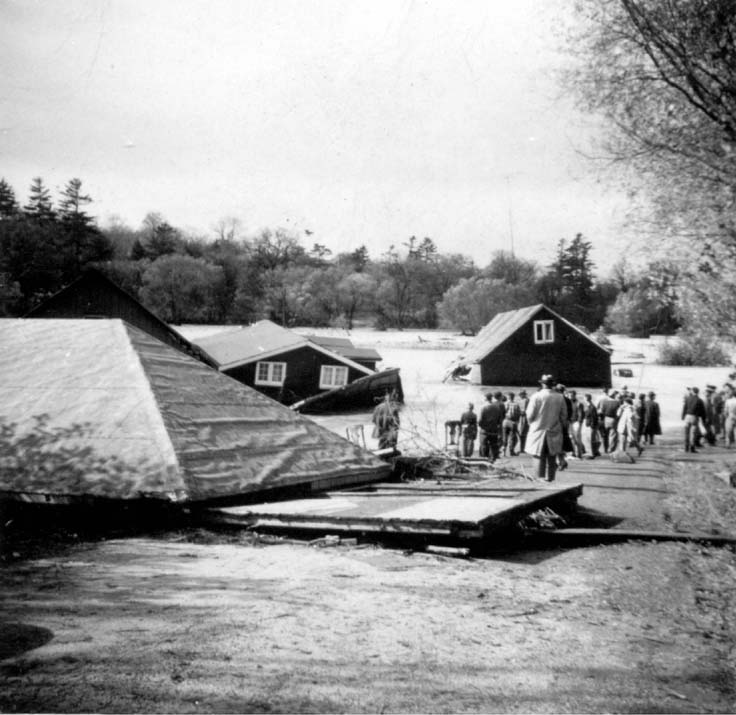
Houses uprooted by flooding of the Humber River after Hurricane Hazel passed through Toronto, 1954

In 1967, the seven smallest municipalities of Metropolitan Toronto were merged with larger neighbours, resulting in a six-municipality configuration that included the former city of Toronto and the surrounding municipalities of East York, Etobicoke, North York, Scarborough, and York.

In the decades after World War II, refugees from war-torn Europe and Chinese job-seekers arrived, as well as construction labourers, particularly from Italy and Portugal. Toronto's population grew to more than one million in 1951 when large-scale suburbanization began and doubled to two million by 1971. Following the elimination of racially based immigration policies by the late 1960s, Toronto became a destination for immigrants from all over the world. By the 1980s, Toronto had surpassed Montreal as Canada's most populous city and chief economic hub. During this time, in part owing to the political uncertainty raised by the resurgence of the Quebec sovereignty movement, many national and multinational corporations moved their head offices from Montreal to Toronto and Western Canadian cities.

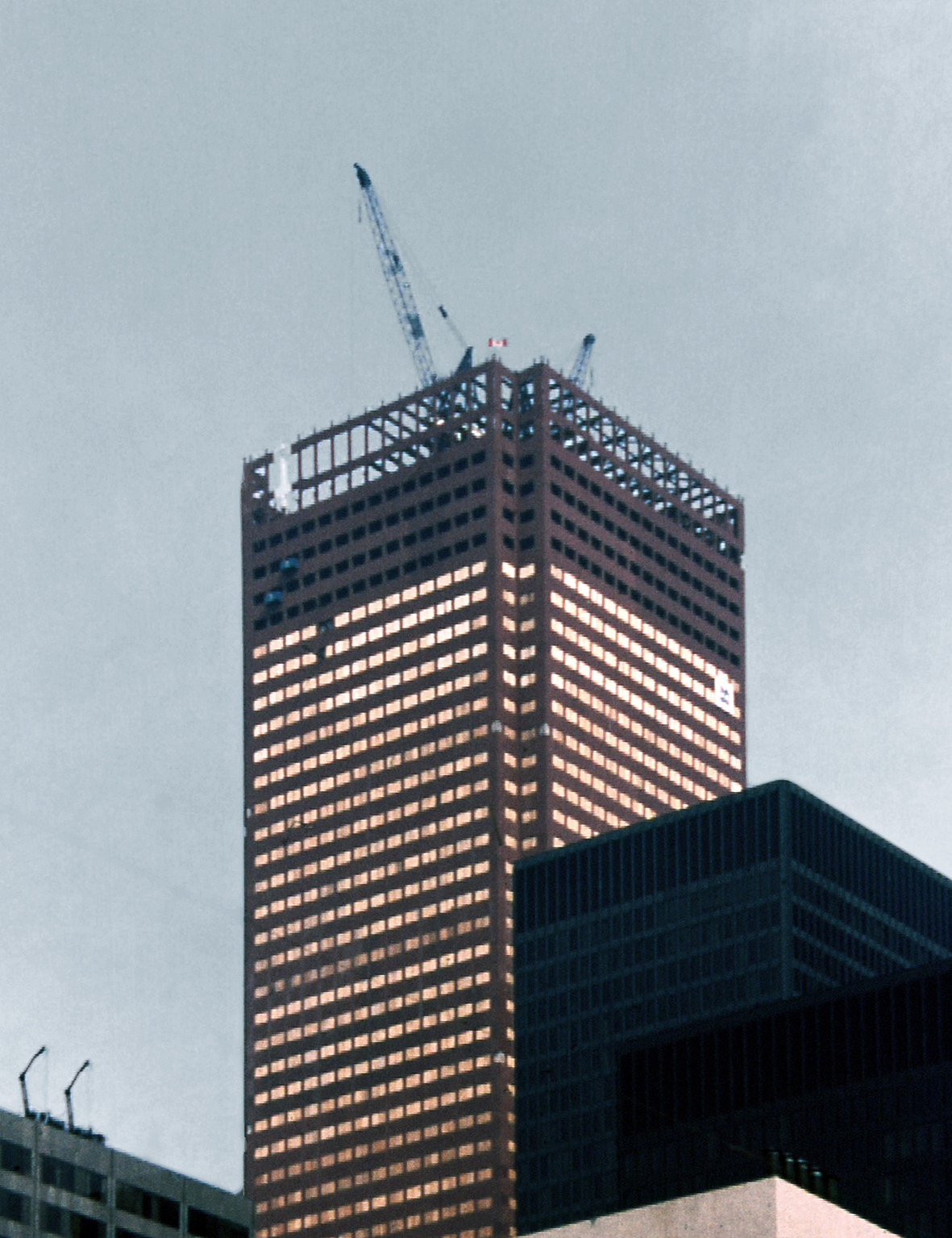
Construction of First Canadian Place, the operational headquarters of the Bank of Montreal, in 1975

=== Amalgamated city (1998–present) ===
On January 1, 1998, the Municipality of Metropolitan Toronto and its six constituent municipalities—East York, Etobicoke, North York, Scarborough, York, and the former City of Toronto—were dissolved and replaced by a single-tier City of Toronto. The provincial government of premier Mike Harris presented amalgamation as a means of reducing municipal costs. In referendums held in March 1997, more than three-quarters of participating voters opposed the proposal, but the votes were not legally binding and the provincial legislature enacted the merger.

Former North York mayor Mel Lastman was elected the first mayor of the amalgamated city in the 1997 Toronto municipal election. In January 1999, a succession of snowstorms immobilized parts of Toronto, prompting Lastman to request assistance from the Canadian Armed Forces for snow removal. The decision attracted extensive national attention and criticism.

Toronto became the centre of Canada's principal outbreak of severe acute respiratory syndrome in 2003. Thousands of residents were quarantined, hospitals introduced extensive infection-control measures, and a temporary World Health Organization travel advisory affected tourism and the local economy. In August of that year, the Northeast blackout of 2003 interrupted electricity, public transit and traffic signals throughout the city as part of a widespread outage affecting Ontario and the northeastern United States.

Toronto hosted the G20 summit on June 26 and 27, 2010. Demonstrations, vandalism and a large police operation accompanied the summit. More than 1,000 people were arrested or detained, constituting the largest mass arrest in Canadian history; subsequent investigations and litigation criticized police conduct during the event.

In July 2013, a severe rainstorm caused widespread flooding, disrupted rail and subway service, and left approximately 450,000 Toronto Hydro customers without electricity. A major ice storm in December 2013 caused another prolonged outage affecting more than 300,000 customers. Toronto subsequently hosted WorldPride in 2014 and the Pan American and Parapan American Games in 2015.

During the 2010s, Toronto experienced rapid population growth and extensive residential intensification. A Toronto Metropolitan University study found that the city added an estimated 77,435 residents during the year ending July 1, 2018—the largest absolute increase among the central cities of Canada and the United States. The Toronto metropolitan area added 125,298 residents during the same period, ranking second behind the Dallas–Fort Worth metropolitan area. International migration was the principal source of Toronto's growth.

The population increase was accompanied by a high-rise construction boom that substantially expanded Toronto's skyline. Residential and mixed-use towers became the principal forms of major construction, particularly in and around downtown and other designated growth centres. In the first quarter of 2022, the Rider Levett Bucknall Crane Index counted 252 operating tower cranes in Toronto, compared with 51 in Los Angeles, the second-highest total among the North American cities surveyed. Toronto had led the survey in every year since 2015.

Canada's first confirmed case of COVID-19 was diagnosed in Toronto in January 2020. The resulting pandemic produced successive public-health restrictions, placed substantial pressure on hospitals and temporarily interrupted the city's preceding population growth.

Population growth accelerated again after the initial pandemic period. Statistics Canada estimated that the City of Toronto added approximately 143,000 residents in the year ending July 1, 2024, while the Toronto census metropolitan area added approximately 269,000. Permanent and non-permanent international migration accounted for most of the increase.

Growth slowed sharply in the following year as international migration declined. Preliminary estimates for the year ending July 1, 2025 indicated that the city's population decreased by approximately 9,000 and the metropolitan population by approximately 1,000.

== Geography ==
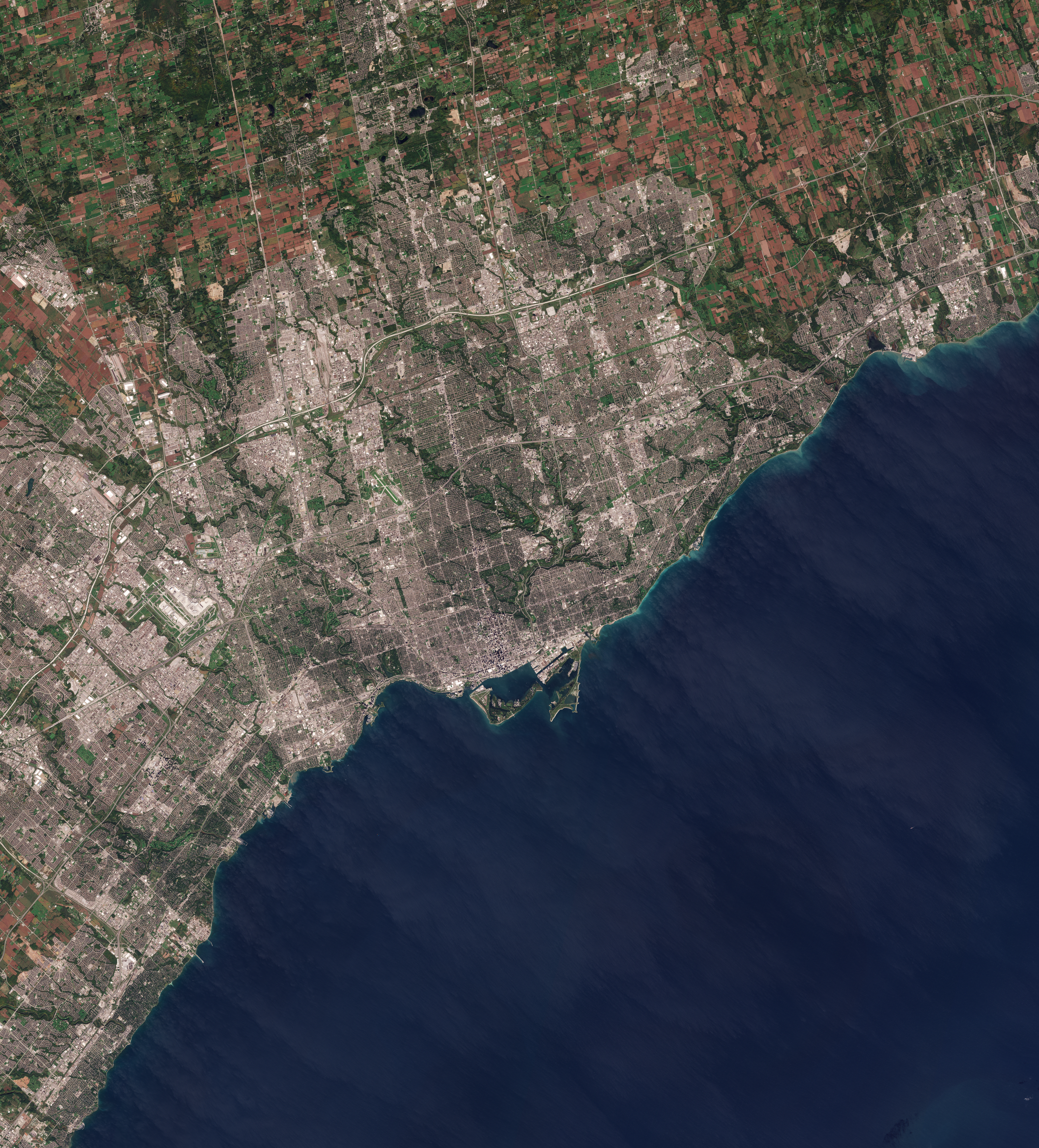
Satellite image of Toronto and the surrounding suburbs in 2018

Toronto covers an area of 631 square kilometres (244 sq mi), with a maximum north–south distance of 21 kilometres (13 mi). It has a maximum east–west distance of 43 kilometres (27 mi), and it has a 46-kilometre (29 mi) long waterfront shoreline, on the northwestern shore of Lake Ontario. The Toronto Islands and Port Lands extend out into the lake, allowing for a somewhat sheltered Toronto Harbour south of the downtown core. An Outer Harbour was constructed southeast of downtown during the 1950s and 1960s, and it is now used for recreation. Toronto's limits are formed by Lake Ontario to the south, the western boundary of Marie Curtis Park, Etobicoke Creek, Eglinton Avenue, and Highway 427 to the west, Steeles Avenue to the north, and the Rouge River and the Scarborough–Pickering Townline to the east.

=== Topography ===
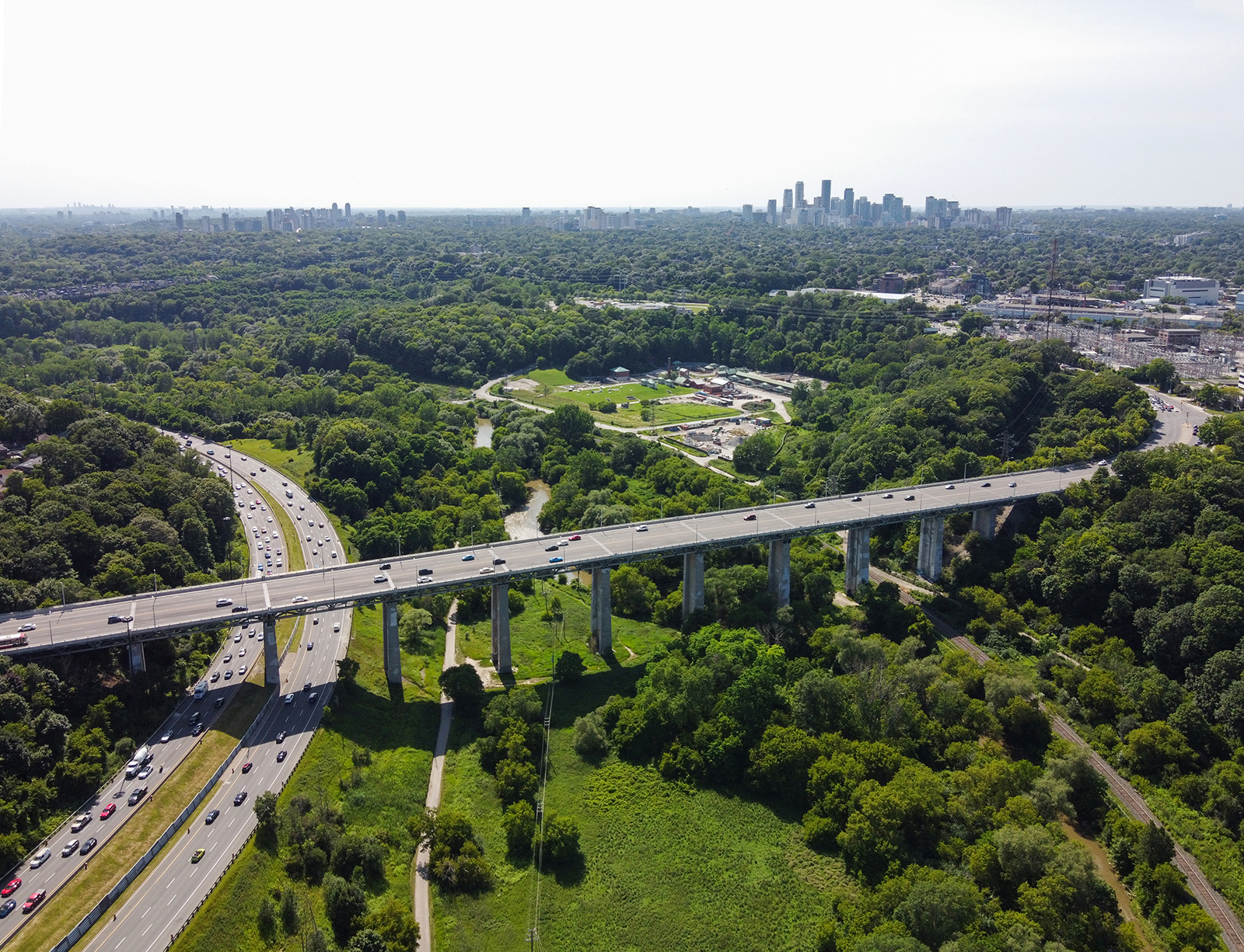
Leaside Bridge crossing the Don valley ravine in 2023. The Toronto ravine system and its waterways cut through the city's landscape.

The city is mostly flat or gentle hills, and the land gently slopes upward away from the lake. The flat land is interrupted by the Toronto ravine system, which is cut by numerous creeks and rivers of the Toronto waterway system, most notably the Humber River in the west end, the Don River east of downtown (these two rivers flanking and defining the Toronto Harbour), and the Rouge River at the city's eastern limits. Most of the ravines and valley lands in Toronto today are parklands and recreational trails are laid out along the ravines and valleys. The original town was laid out in a grid plan on the flat plain north of the harbour, and this plan was extended outwards as the city grew. The width and depth of several of the ravines and valleys are such that several grid streets, such as Finch Avenue, Leslie Street, Lawrence Avenue, and St. Clair Avenue, terminate on one side of a ravine or valley and continue on the other side. Toronto has many bridges spanning the ravines. Large bridges such as the Prince Edward Viaduct were built to span broad river valleys.

Despite its deep ravines, Toronto is not remarkably hilly, but its elevation does increase steadily away from the lake. Elevation differences range from 76.5 metres (251 feet) above sea level at the Lake Ontario shore to 209 m (686 ft) above sea level near the York University grounds in the city's north end at the intersection of Keele Street and Steeles Avenue. There are occasional hilly areas; in particular, midtown Toronto, as well as the Silverthorn and Fairbank neighbourhoods, have several sharply sloping hills. Lake Ontario remains occasionally visible from the peaks of these ridges as far north as Eglinton Avenue, 7 to 8 kilometres (4.3 to 5.0 mi) inland.

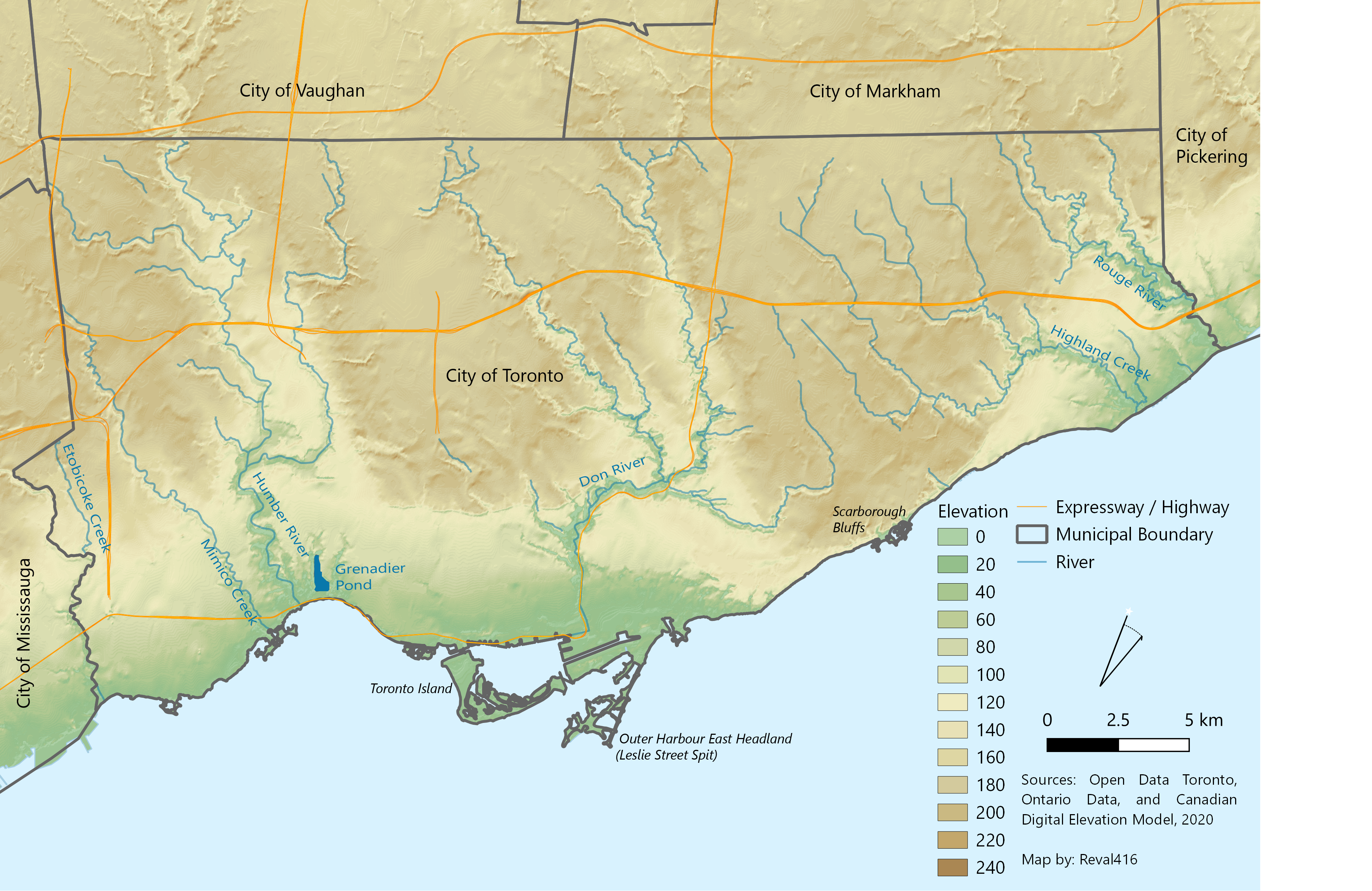
Topographical map of Toronto. The terrain elevation increases steadily away from the shoreline.

The other major geographical feature of Toronto is its escarpments. During the last ice age, the lower part of Toronto was beneath Glacial Lake Iroquois. Today, a series of escarpments mark the lake's former boundary, known as the "Iroquois Shoreline". The escarpments are most prominent from Victoria Park Avenue to the mouth of Highland Creek, where they form the Scarborough Bluffs. Other observable sections include the area near St. Clair Avenue West between Bathurst Street and the Don River, and north of Davenport Road from Caledonia to Spadina Road; the Casa Loma grounds sit above this escarpment.

The geography of the lakeshore has dramatically changed since the first settlement of Toronto. Much of the land on the harbour's north shore is landfill, filled in during the late 19th century. Until then, the lakefront docks (then known as wharves) were set back farther inland than today. Much of the adjacent Port Lands on the harbour's east side was a wetland filled in early in the 20th century. The shoreline from the harbour west to the Humber River has been extended into the lake. Further west, landfill has been used to create extensions of land such as Humber Bay Park.

View of the Toronto Islands, an island chain that bounds Toronto's Inner Harbour

The Toronto Islands were a natural peninsula until a storm in 1858 severed their connection to the mainland, creating a channel to the harbour. The peninsula was formed by longshore drift taking the sediments deposited along the Scarborough Bluffs shore and transporting them to the Islands area.

The other source of sediment for the Port Lands wetland and the peninsula was the deposition of the Don River, which carved a wide valley through the sedimentary land of Toronto and deposited it in the shallow harbour. The harbour and the channel of the Don River have been dredged numerous times for shipping. The lower section of the Don River was straightened and channelled in the 19th century. The former mouth drained into a wetland; today, the Don River drains into the harbour through a concrete waterway, the Keating Channel. To mitigate flooding in the area, as well as to create parkland, a second more natural mouth was built to the south during the first half of the 2020s, thereby creating a new island, Ookwemin Minising.

=== Neighbourhoods and former municipalities ===
Map of Toronto with major traffic routes. Also shown are the limits of six former municipalities, which form the current City of Toronto.

Toronto encompasses an area formerly administered by several separate municipalities that were amalgamated over the years. Each developed a distinct history and identity over the years, and their names remain in common use among Torontonians. Former municipalities include East York, Etobicoke, Forest Hill, Mimico, North York, Parkdale, Scarborough, Swansea, Weston and York. Throughout the city, there exist hundreds of small neighbourhoods and some larger neighbourhoods covering a few square kilometres.

The many residential communities of Toronto express a character distinct from the skyscrapers in the commercial core. Victorian and Edwardian-era residential buildings can be found in enclaves such as Rosedale, Cabbagetown, The Annex, and Yorkville. The Wychwood Park neighbourhood, historically significant for the architecture of its homes, and for being one of Toronto's earliest planned communities, was designated as an Ontario Heritage Conservation district in 1985. The Casa Loma neighbourhood is named after "Casa Loma", a castle built in 1911 by Sir Henry Pellat, complete with gardens, turrets, stables, an elevator, secret passages, and a bowling alley. Spadina House is a 19th-century manor that is now a museum.

==== Old Toronto ====
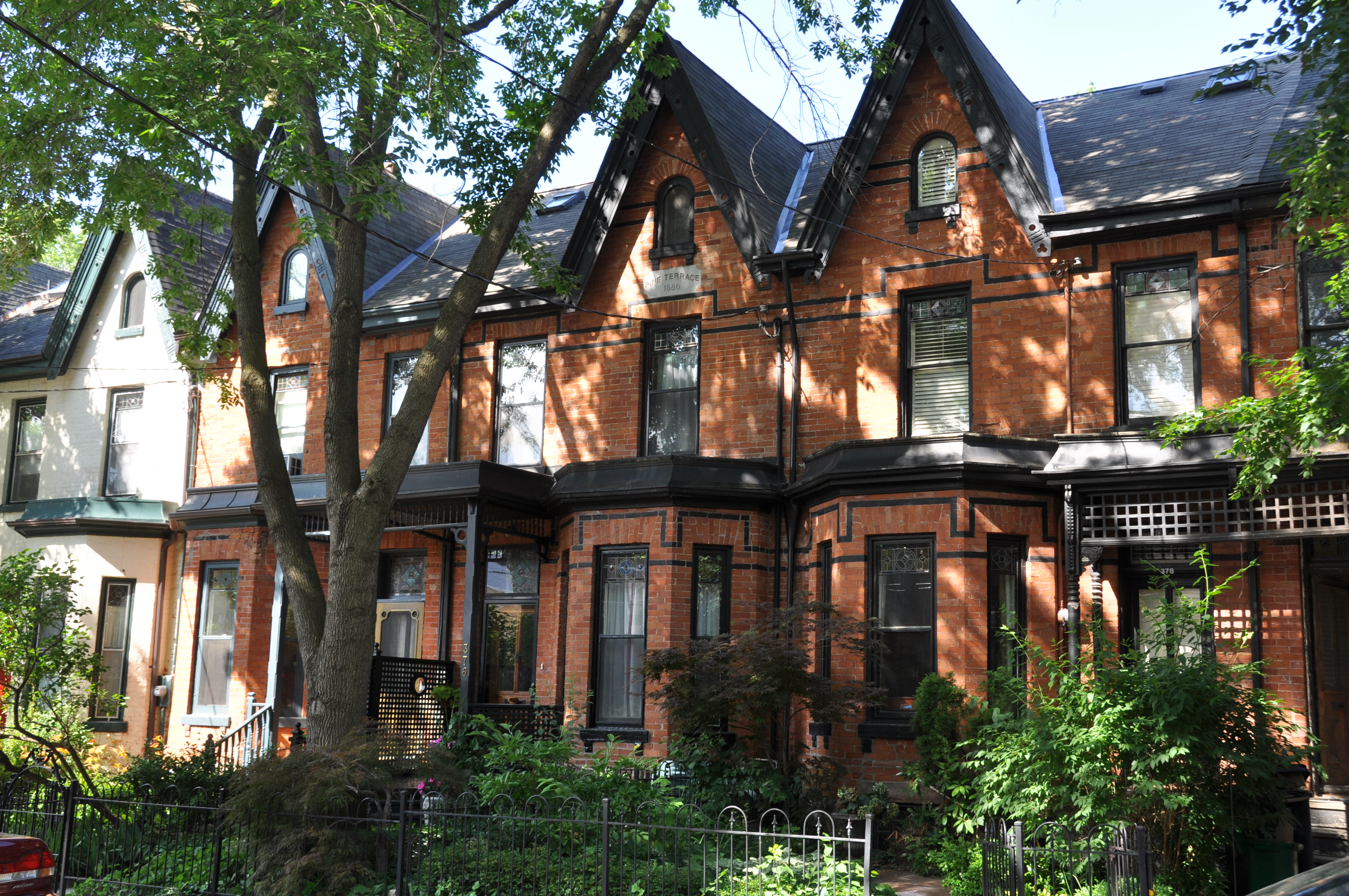
Victorian-era Bay-and-gable houses are a distinct architectural style of residence that is ubiquitous throughout the older neighbourhoods of Toronto.

The pre-amalgamation City of Toronto covers the downtown core and older neighbourhoods to the east, west, and north. It is the most densely populated part of the city. The Financial District contains the First Canadian Place, Toronto-Dominion Centre, Scotia Plaza, Royal Bank Plaza, Commerce Court and Brookfield Place. This area includes, among others, the neighbourhoods of St. James Town, Garden District, St. Lawrence, Corktown, and Church and Wellesley. From that point, the Toronto skyline extends northward along Yonge Street.

Old Toronto is also home to many historically wealthy residential enclaves, such as Yorkville, Rosedale, The Annex, Forest Hill, Lawrence Park, Lytton Park, Deer Park, Moore Park, and Casa Loma, most stretching away from downtown to the north. East and west of downtown, neighbourhoods such as Kensington Market, Chinatown, Leslieville, Cabbagetown and Riverdale are home to bustling commercial and cultural areas as well as communities of artists with studio lofts, with many middle- and upper-class professionals. Other neighbourhoods in the central city retain an ethnic identity, including two smaller Chinatowns, the Greektown area, Little Italy, Portugal Village, and Little India, among others.

==== Suburbs ====
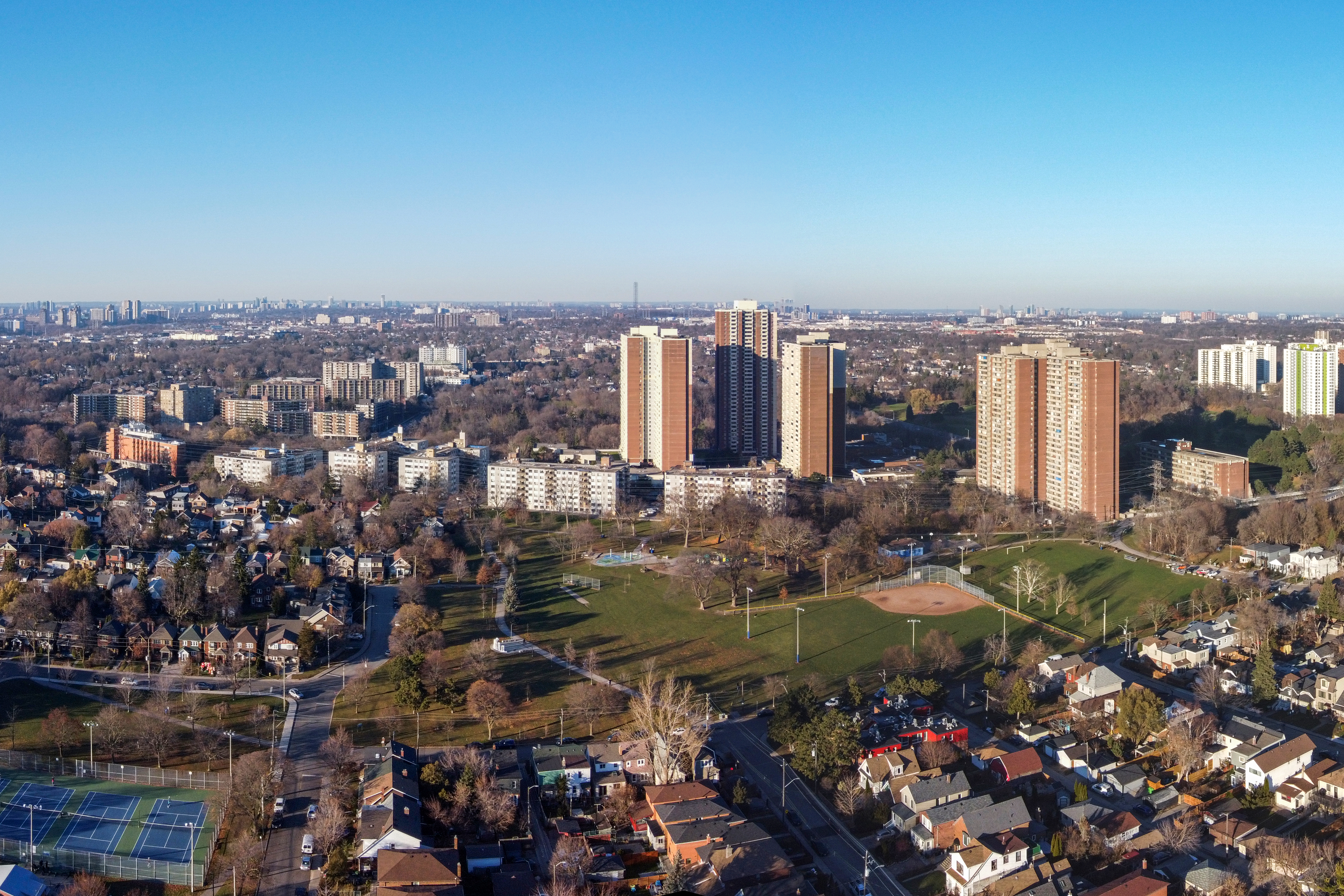
Crescent Town and the surrounding area from the air. Crescent Town was a post-World War II suburban neighbourhood developed in East York.

The inner suburbs are contained within the former municipalities of York and East York. These are mature and traditionally working-class areas, consisting primarily of post–World War I small, single-family homes and small apartment blocks. Neighbourhoods such as Crescent Town, Thorncliffe Park, Flemingdon Park, Weston, and Oakwood Village consist mainly of high-rise apartments, which are home to many new immigrant families. During the 2000s, many neighbourhoods became ethnically diverse and underwent gentrification due to increasing population and a housing boom during the late 1990s and the early 21st century. The first neighbourhoods affected were Leaside and North Toronto, gradually progressing into the western neighbourhoods in York.

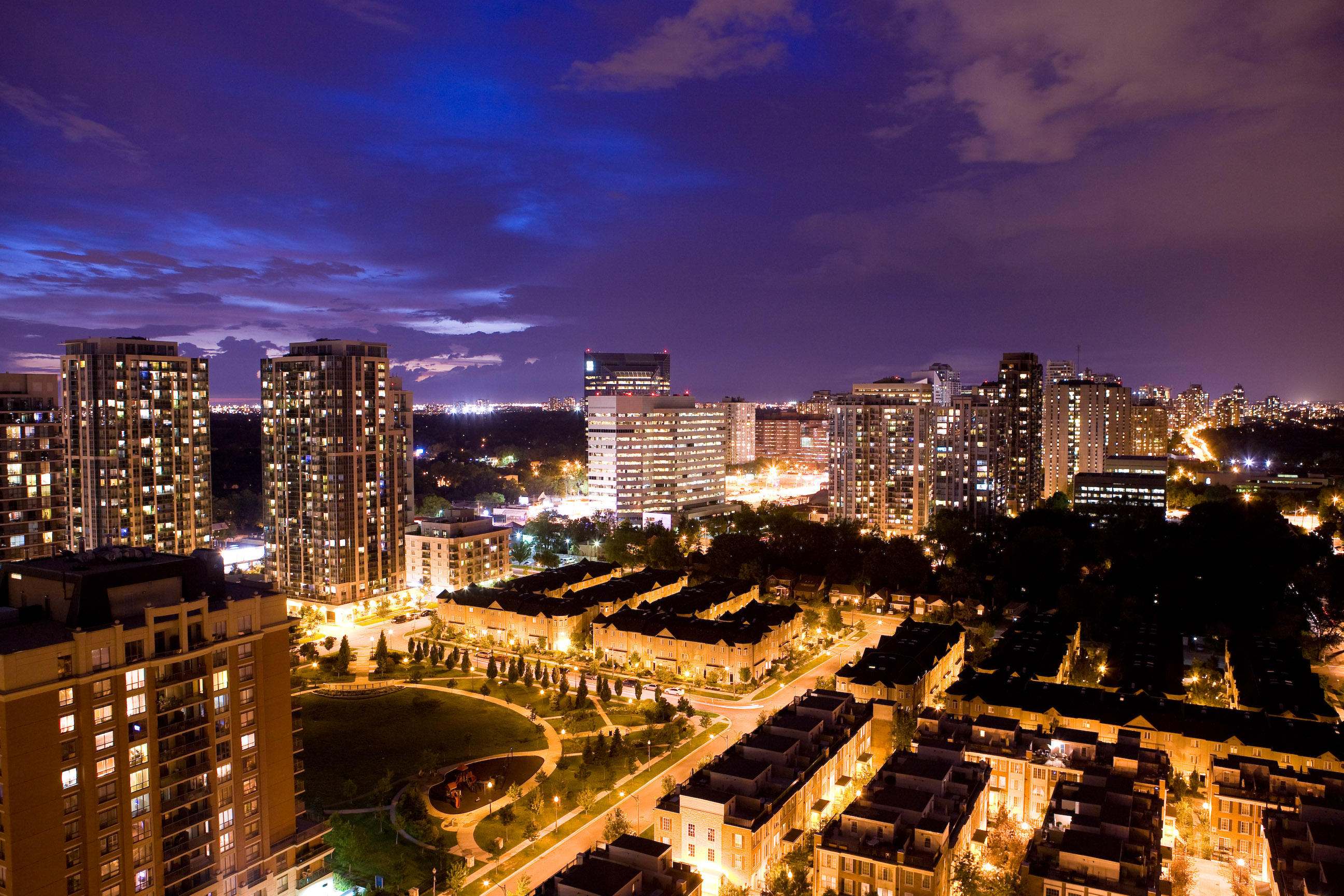
In an attempt to curb suburban sprawl, many suburban neighbourhoods in Toronto encouraged high-density populations by mixing housing lots with apartment buildings far from the downtown core.

The outer suburbs comprising the former municipalities of Etobicoke (west), Scarborough (east) and North York (north) largely retain the grid plan laid before post-war development. Sections were long established and quickly growing towns before the suburban housing boom began and the emergence of metropolitan government, existing towns or villages such as Mimico, Islington and New Toronto in Etobicoke; Willowdale, Newtonbrook and Downsview in North York; Agincourt, Wexford and West Hill in Scarborough where suburban development boomed around or between these and other towns beginning in the late 1940s. Upscale neighbourhoods were built, such as the Bridle Path in North York, the area surrounding the Scarborough Bluffs in Guildwood, and most of central Etobicoke, such as Humber Valley Village, and The Kingsway. One of the largest and earliest "planned communities" was Don Mills, parts of which were first built in the 1950s. Phased development, mixing single-detached housing with higher-density apartment blocks, became more popular as a suburban model of development. During the late 20th century, North York City Centre and Scarborough City Centre developed separate downtown districts outside Downtown Toronto after the former boroughs were promoted to cities. High-rise development in these areas has given these former municipalities distinguishable skylines of their own, with high-density transit corridors serving them; some of these developments are also transit-oriented.

==== Industrial ====
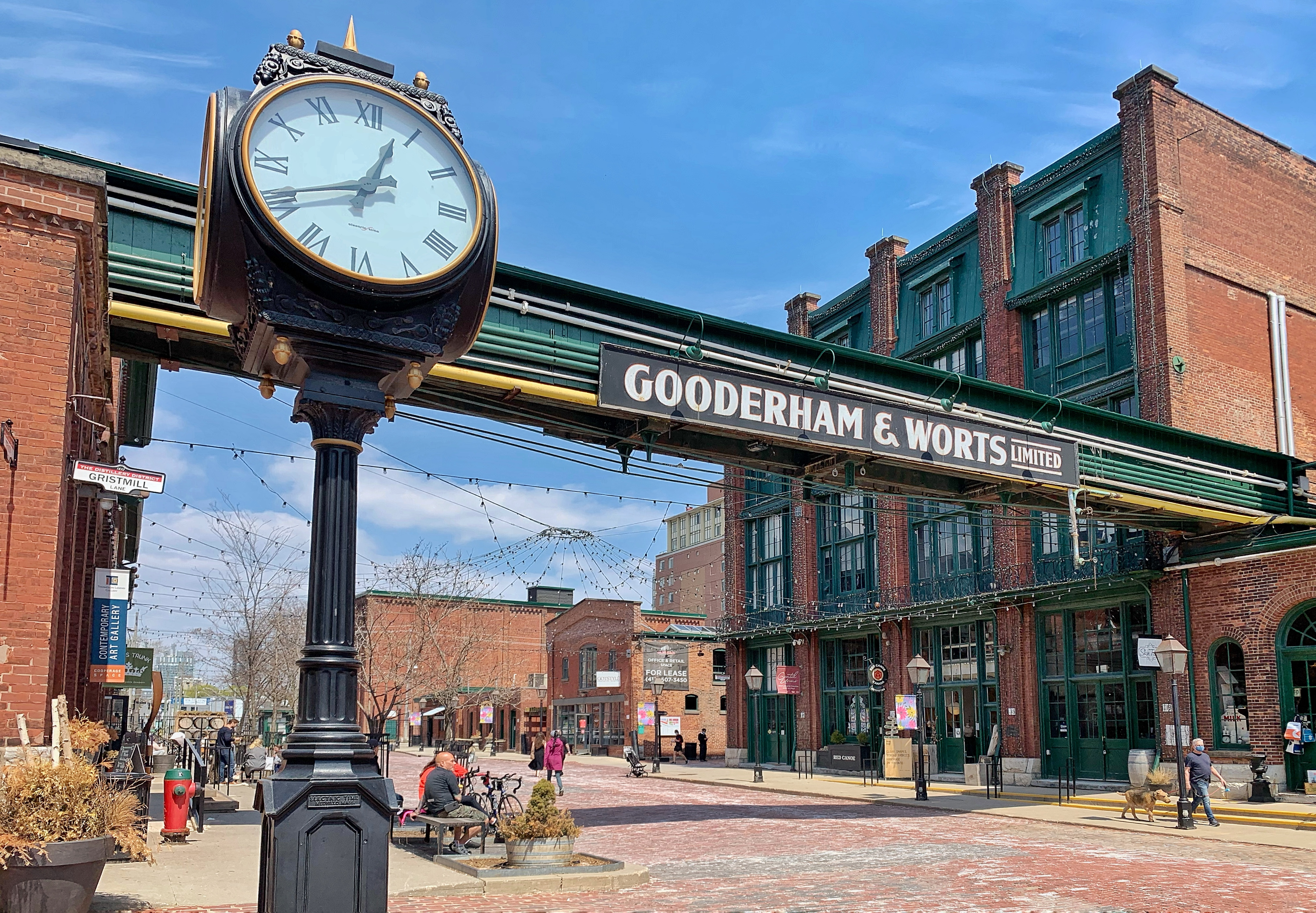
The Distillery District holds the most extensive collection of preserved Victorian industrial architecture in North America.

In the 1800s, a thriving industrial area developed around Toronto Harbour and the lower Don River mouth, linked by rail and water to Canada and the United States. Examples included the Gooderham and Worts Distillery, Canadian Malting Company, the Toronto Rolling Mills, the Union Stockyards and the Davies pork processing facility (the inspiration for the "Hogtown" nickname). This industrial area expanded west along the harbour and rail lines and was supplemented by the infilling of the marshlands on the east side of the harbour to create the Port Lands. A garment industry developed along lower Spadina Avenue, the "Fashion District". Beginning in the late 19th century, industrial areas were set up on the outskirts, such as West Toronto / The Junction, where the Stockyards relocated in 1903. The Great Fire of 1904 destroyed a large amount of industry in the downtown. Some companies moved west along King Street, and some moved as far west as Dufferin Street, where the large Massey-Harris farm equipment manufacturing complex was located. Over time, pockets of industrial land mostly followed rail lines and later highway corridors as the city grew outwards. This trend continues to this day; the largest factories and distribution warehouses are in the suburban environs of Peel and York Regions, but also within the current city: Etobicoke (concentrated around Pearson Airport), North York, and Scarborough.

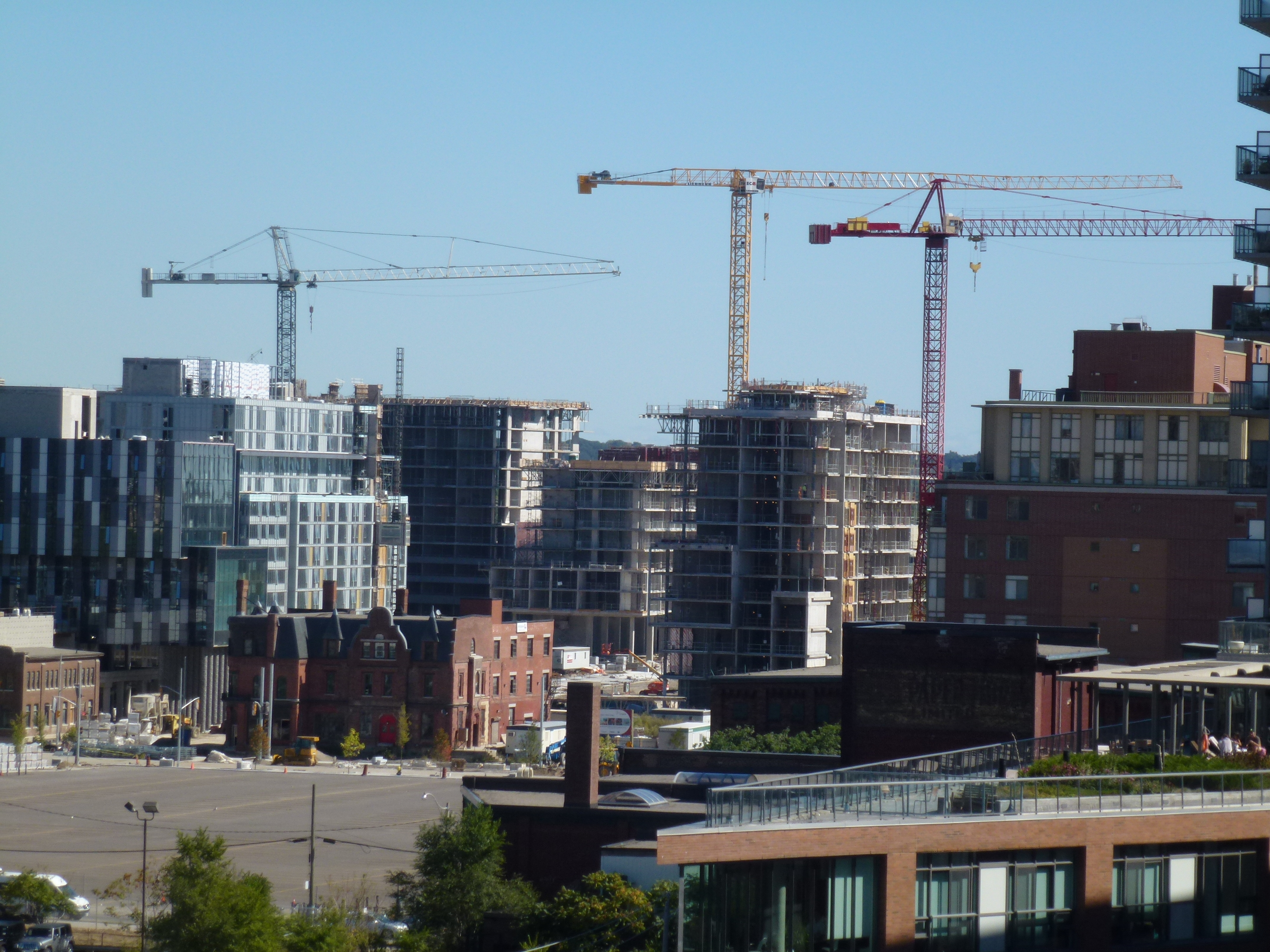
The West Don Lands is a former industrial site in downtown Toronto that has undergone redevelopment.

Many of Toronto's former industrial sites close to (or in) downtown have been redeveloped, including parts of the Toronto waterfront, the rail yards west of downtown, and Liberty Village, the Massey-Harris district and large-scale development is underway in the West Don Lands. The Gooderham & Worts Distillery produced spirits until 1990 and is preserved today as the "Distillery District", the largest and best-preserved collection of Victorian industrial architecture in North America. Some industry remains in the area, including the Redpath Sugar Refinery. Similar areas that retain their industrial character but are now largely residential are the Fashion District, Corktown, and parts of South Riverdale and Leslieville. Toronto still has some active older industrial areas, such as Brockton Village, Mimico and New Toronto. In the west end of Old Toronto and York, the Weston/Mount Dennis and The Junction areas still contain factories, meat-packing facilities and rail yards close to medium-density residential. However, the Junction's Union Stockyards moved out of Toronto in 1994.

The brownfield industrial area of the Port Lands, on the east side of the harbour, is one area planned for redevelopment. Formerly a marsh that was filled in to create industrial space, it was never intensely developed—its land unsuitable for large-scale development—because of flooding and unstable soil. It still contains numerous industrial uses, such as the Portlands Energy Centre power plant, port facilities, movie and television production studios, concrete processing facilities, and low-density industrial facilities. The Waterfront Toronto agency has developed plans for a naturalized mouth to the Don River and to create a flood barrier around the Don, making more of the land on the harbour suitable for higher-value residential and commercial development. A former chemicals plant site along the Don River is slated to become a large commercial complex and transportation hub.

=== Architecture ===
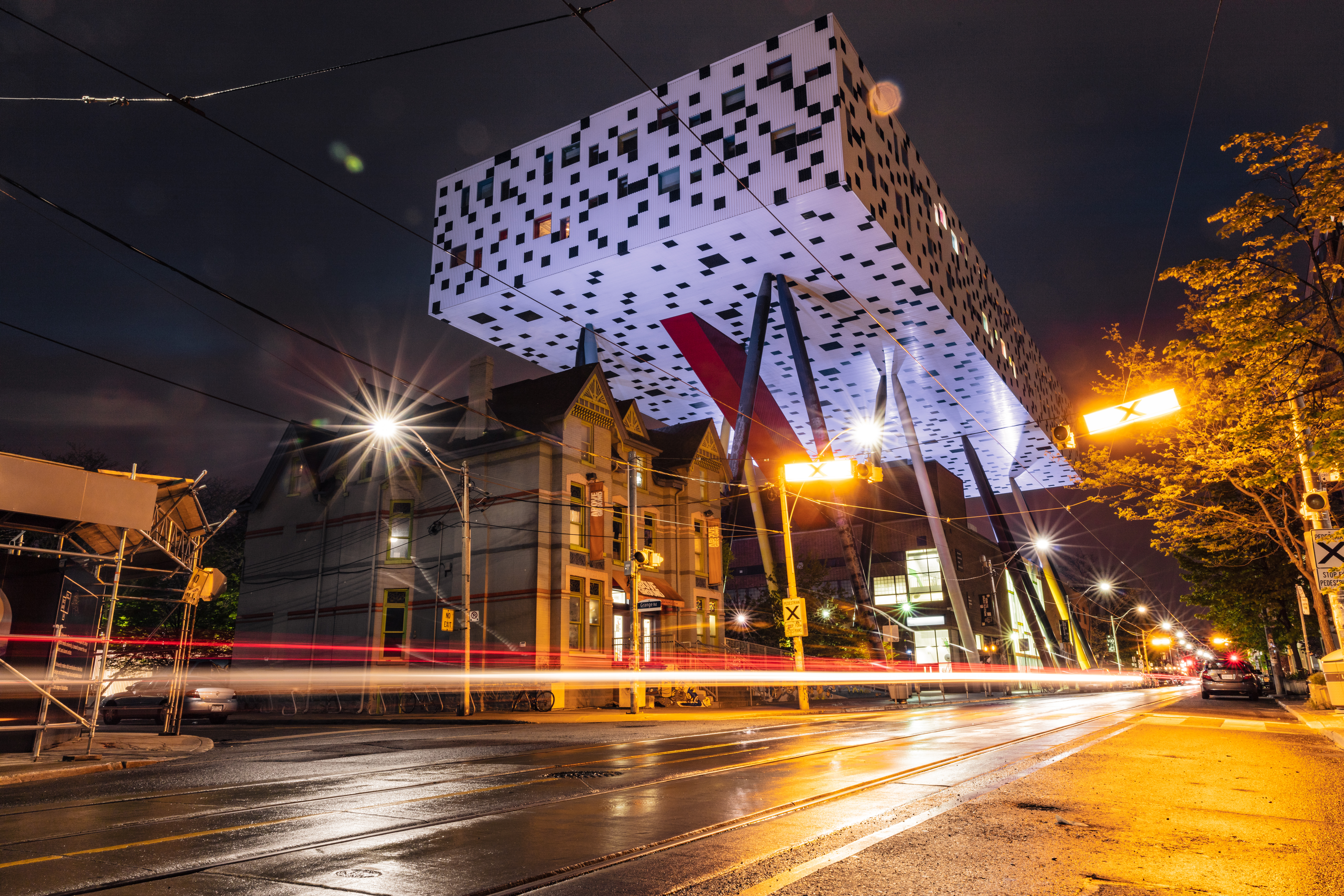
The Rosalie Sharp Centre for Design, an extension of OCAD University's main building

Toronto's buildings vary in design and age, with many structures dating back to the early 19th century, while other prominent buildings were just newly built in the first decade of the 21st century. Lawrence Richards, a member of the Faculty of Architecture at the University of Toronto, has said, "Toronto is a new, brash, rag-tag place—a big mix of periods and styles." Bay-and-gable houses, mainly found in Old Toronto, are a distinct architectural feature of the city.

Toronto is a city with a substantial amount of skyscrapers and high-rise buildings. The city has 106 skyscrapers taller than 150 metres (492 ft), the 16th-most in the world and the most in Canada by far. There are currently three "supertall" skyscrapers (taller than 300 metres (984 ft)) under construction in the city, and more have been approved. Defining the Toronto skyline is the CN Tower, a telecommunications and tourism hub. Completed in 1976 at a height of 553.33 metres (1,815 ft 5 in), it was the world's tallest freestanding structure until 2007 when it was surpassed by Burj Khalifa in Dubai.

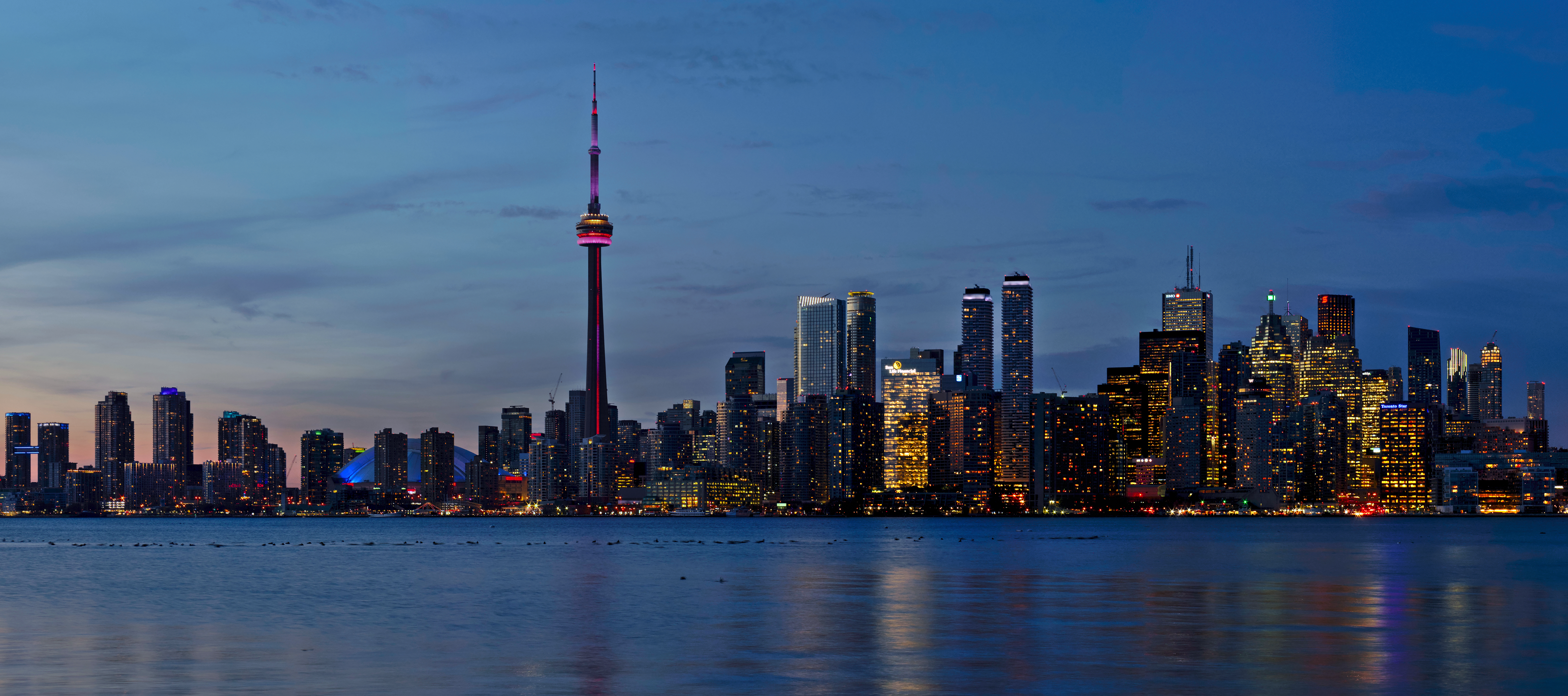
Sunset Toronto Skyline

Through the 1960s and 1970s, significant pieces of Toronto's architectural heritage were demolished to make way for redevelopment or parking. In contrast, since 2000, amid the Canadian property bubble, Toronto has experienced a condo construction boom and architectural revival, with several buildings opened by world-renowned architects. Daniel Libeskind's Royal Ontario Museum addition, Frank Gehry's remake of the Art Gallery of Ontario, and Will Alsop's distinctive OCAD University expansion are among the city's new showpieces. The mid-1800s Distillery District, on the eastern edge of downtown, has been redeveloped into a pedestrian-oriented arts, culture and entertainment neighbourhood. This construction boom has some observers call the phenomenon the Manhattanization of Toronto after the densely built island borough of New York City.

=== Climate ===
Toronto

Climate chart (precipitation, max. and min. temperature)
J	F	M	A	M	J	J	A	S	O	N	D
65 0 −7	54 1 −6	53 5 −2	78 12 4	76 19 10	82 24 15	77 27 18	72 26 18	69 22 14	69 15 8	71 8 2	58 3 −3
- █ Average max. and min. temperatures in °C
- █ Precipitation totals in mm
- Source: Environment Canada
Imperial conversion
J	F	M	A	M	J	J	A	S	O	N	D
2.5 31 20	2.1 33 21	2.1 41 29	3.1 53 39	3 66 50	3.2 76 60	3 81 65	2.8 79 64	2.7 72 57	2.7 58 46	2.8 47 36	2.3 37 27
- █ Average max. and min. temperatures in °F
- █ Precipitation totals in inches

The city of Toronto has a hot summer humid continental climate (Köppen: Dfa), though was on the threshold of a warm summer humid continental climate (Dfb) until the 20th century due to the urban heat island but still found in the metropolitan region, with warm, humid summers and cold winters. According to the classification applied by Natural Resources Canada, the city of Toronto is in plant hardiness zone 7a. Some suburbs and nearby towns have lower zone ratings.

The city experiences four distinct seasons, with considerable variance in length. As a result of the rapid passage of weather systems (such as high- and low-pressure systems), the weather is variable from day to day in all seasons. Owing to urbanization and its proximity to water, Toronto has a fairly low diurnal temperature range. The denser urbanscape makes for warmer nights year-round; the average nighttime temperature is about 3.0 °C (5.4 °F) warmer in the city than in rural areas in all months. However, it can be noticeably cooler on many spring and early summer afternoons under the influence of a lake breeze, since Lake Ontario is cool relative to the air during these seasons. These lake breezes mostly occur in summer, bringing relief on hot days. Other low-scale maritime effects on the climate include lake-effect snow, fog, and delaying of spring- and fall-like conditions, known as seasonal lag.

Winters are cold, with frequent snow. During the winter months, temperatures are usually below 0 °C (32 °F). Toronto winters sometimes feature cold snaps when maximum temperatures remain below −10 °C (14 °F), often made to feel colder by wind chill. Occasionally, they can drop below −25 °C (−13 °F). Snowstorms, sometimes mixed with ice and rain, can disrupt work and travel schedules while accumulating snow can fall anytime from November until mid-April. However, mild stretches also occur in most winters, melting accumulated snow. The summer months are characterized by very warm temperatures. Daytime temperatures are usually above 20 °C (68 °F), and often rise above 30 °C (86 °F). However, they can occasionally surpass 35 °C (95 °F) accompanied by high humidity. Spring and autumn are transitional seasons with generally mild or cool temperatures with alternating dry and wet periods. Daytime temperatures average around 10 to 12 °C (50 to 54 °F) during these seasons.

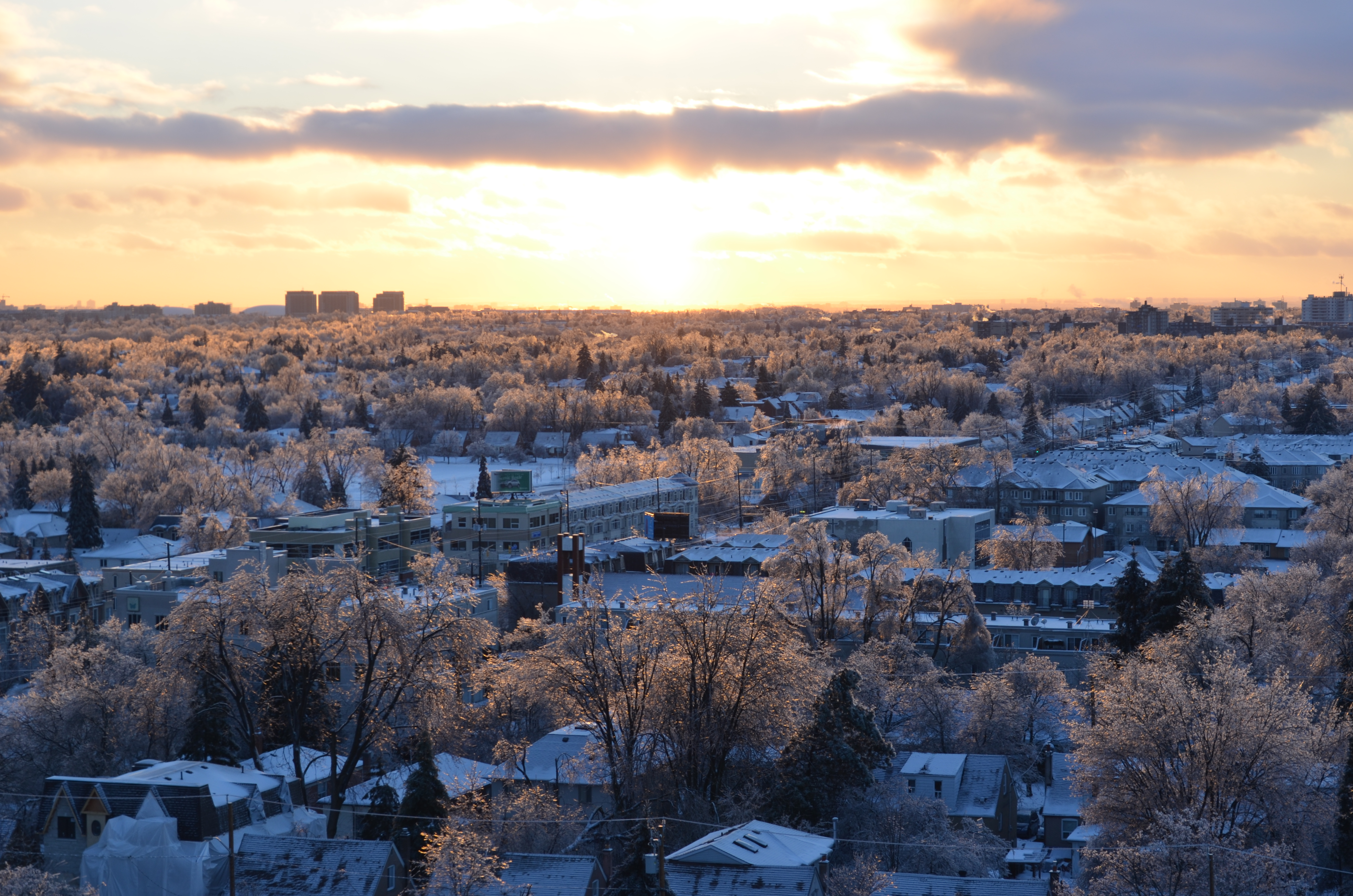
Winters in Toronto are typically cold with frequent snowfall.

Precipitation is fairly evenly distributed throughout the year, but summer is usually the wettest season, the bulk falling during thunderstorms. The average yearly precipitation is 822.7 mm (32.4 in), with an average annual snowfall of 121.5 cm (48 in). Toronto experiences an average of 2,066 sunshine hours or 45 per cent of daylight hours, varying between a low of 28 per cent in December to 60 per cent in July.

Climate change has affected Toronto, and as a consequence, the Toronto City Council declared a climate emergency, setting a net-zero carbon emissions target by 2040 through the TransformTO climate action plan.

The highest temperature ever recorded in Toronto was 40.6 °C (105 °F) on July 8, 9 and 10, 1936, during the 1936 North American heat wave. The coldest temperature ever recorded was −32.8 °C (−27 °F) on January 10, 1859.

Climate data for Toronto (The Annex) WMO ID: 71266; coordinates 43°40′N 79°24′W; elevation: 112.5 m (369 ft); 1991–2020 (Note: Humidex, wind chill, average rain, average snow, rain days, snow days, and sunshine are from 1981 to 2010) normals, extremes 1840–present (Note: Maximum and minimum temperature data at The Annex was recorded by human observers from March 1840 to June 2003 under the station name "TORONTO". From July 2003 to present, climate data has been recorded by an automatic weather station under the name "TORONTO CITY".)
Month	Jan	Feb	Mar	Apr	May	Jun	Jul	Aug	Sep	Oct	Nov	Dec	Year
Record high humidex	15.7	12.2	21.7	31.6	39.8	44.5	43.0	42.6	43.8	31.2	26.1	17.7	44.5
Record high °C (°F)	16.1 (61.0)	19.1 (66.4)	26.7 (80.1)	32.2 (90.0)	34.4 (93.9)	36.7 (98.1)	40.6 (105.1)	38.9 (102.0)	37.8 (100.0)	30.8 (87.4)	23.9 (75.0)	19.9 (67.8)	40.6 (105.1)
Mean daily maximum °C (°F)	−0.3 (31.5)	0.6 (33.1)	5.1 (41.2)	11.7 (53.1)	18.8 (65.8)	24.2 (75.6)	27.0 (80.6)	26.1 (79.0)	22.0 (71.6)	14.6 (58.3)	8.1 (46.6)	2.6 (36.7)	13.4 (56.1)
Daily mean °C (°F)	−3.5 (25.7)	−2.7 (27.1)	1.7 (35.1)	7.8 (46.0)	14.5 (58.1)	19.8 (67.6)	22.5 (72.5)	21.9 (71.4)	17.9 (64.2)	11.2 (52.2)	5.2 (41.4)	−0.1 (31.8)	9.7 (49.5)
Mean daily minimum °C (°F)	−6.7 (19.9)	−6.0 (21.2)	−1.8 (28.8)	3.9 (39.0)	10.0 (50.0)	15.3 (59.5)	18.1 (64.6)	17.7 (63.9)	13.8 (56.8)	7.7 (45.9)	2.3 (36.1)	−2.7 (27.1)	6.0 (42.8)
Record low °C (°F)	−32.8 (−27.0)	−31.7 (−25.1)	−26.7 (−16.1)	−15.0 (5.0)	−3.9 (25.0)	−2.2 (28.0)	3.9 (39.0)	4.4 (39.9)	−2.2 (28.0)	−8.9 (16.0)	−20.6 (−5.1)	−30.0 (−22.0)	−32.8 (−27.0)
Record low wind chill	−37	−34	−26	−17	−8	0	0	0	0	−8	−17	−34	−37
Average precipitation mm (inches)	64.6 (2.54)	53.9 (2.12)	52.8 (2.08)	78.0 (3.07)	76.4 (3.01)	81.6 (3.21)	76.5 (3.01)	71.9 (2.83)	69.4 (2.73)	69.1 (2.72)	70.8 (2.79)	57.8 (2.28)	822.7 (32.39)
Average rainfall mm (inches)	29.1 (1.15)	29.7 (1.17)	33.6 (1.32)	61.1 (2.41)	82.0 (3.23)	70.9 (2.79)	63.9 (2.52)	81.1 (3.19)	84.7 (3.33)	64.3 (2.53)	75.4 (2.97)	38.2 (1.50)	714.0 (28.11)
Average snowfall cm (inches)	37.2 (14.6)	27.0 (10.6)	19.8 (7.8)	5.0 (2.0)	0.0 (0.0)	0.0 (0.0)	0.0 (0.0)	0.0 (0.0)	0.0 (0.0)	0.1 (0.0)	8.3 (3.3)	24.1 (9.5)	121.5 (47.8)
Average precipitation days (≥ 0.2 mm)	16.3	12.8	13.0	13.1	13.4	12.1	11.7	9.5	10.2	11.4	13.0	13.7	150.2
Average rainy days (≥ 0.2 mm)	5.4	4.8	7.9	11.2	12.7	11.0	10.4	10.2	11.1	11.7	10.9	7.0	114.1
Average snowy days (≥ 0.2 cm)	12.0	8.7	6.5	2.2	0.0	0.0	0.0	0.0	0.0	0.08	3.1	8.4	40.9
Average relative humidity (%) (at 15:00 LST)	68.0	65.4	58.5	53.4	53.1	55.2	54.3	56.7	59.6	65.0	67.1	70.9	60.6
Mean monthly sunshine hours	85.9	111.3	161.0	180.0	227.7	259.6	279.6	245.6	194.4	154.3	88.9	78.1	2,066.3
Percentage possible sunshine	29.7	37.7	43.6	44.8	50.0	56.3	59.8	56.7	51.7	45.1	30.5	28.0	44.5
Source: Environment and Climate Change Canada

=== Parks ===
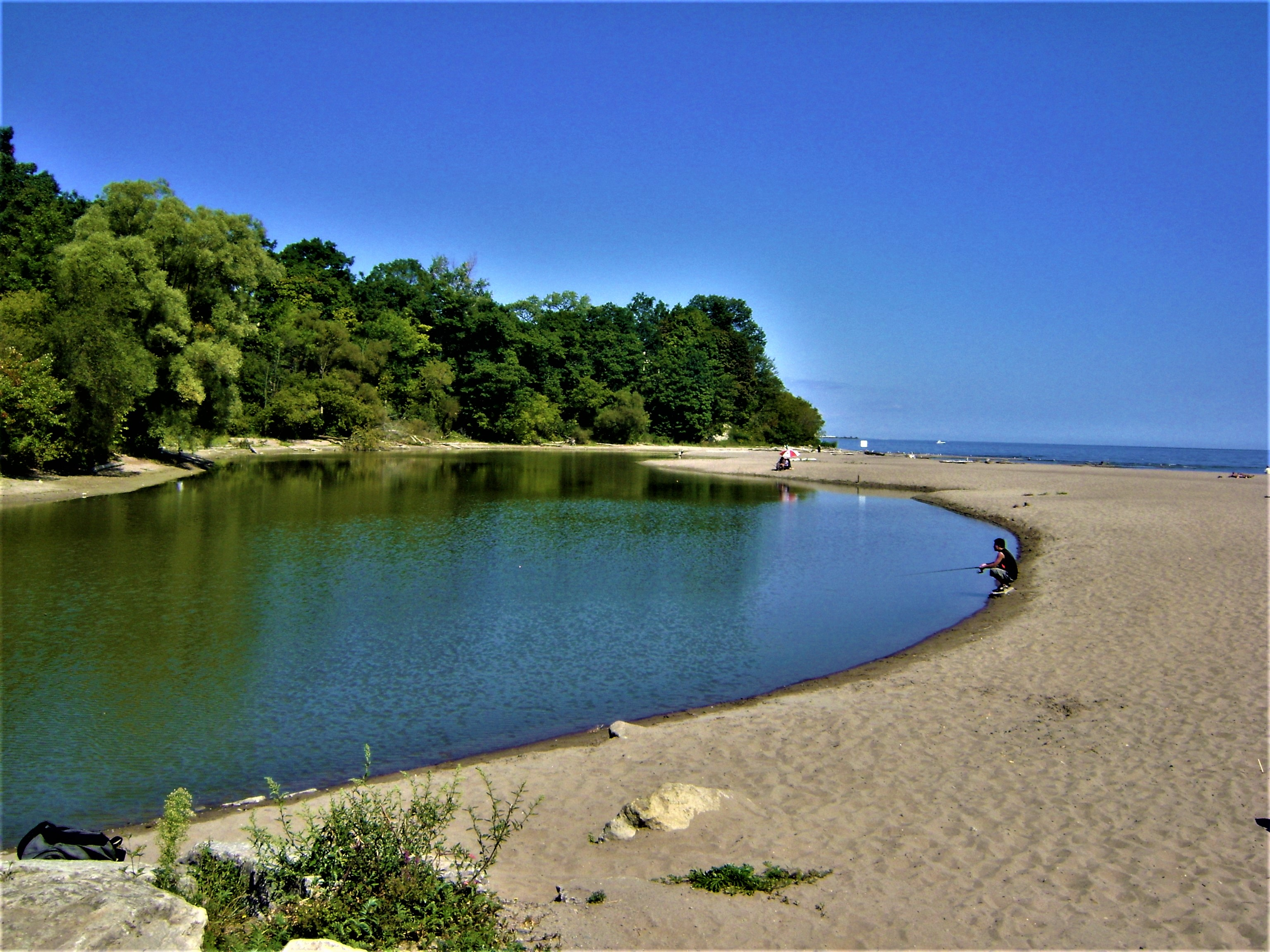
Rouge National Urban Park is a national park in Scarborough

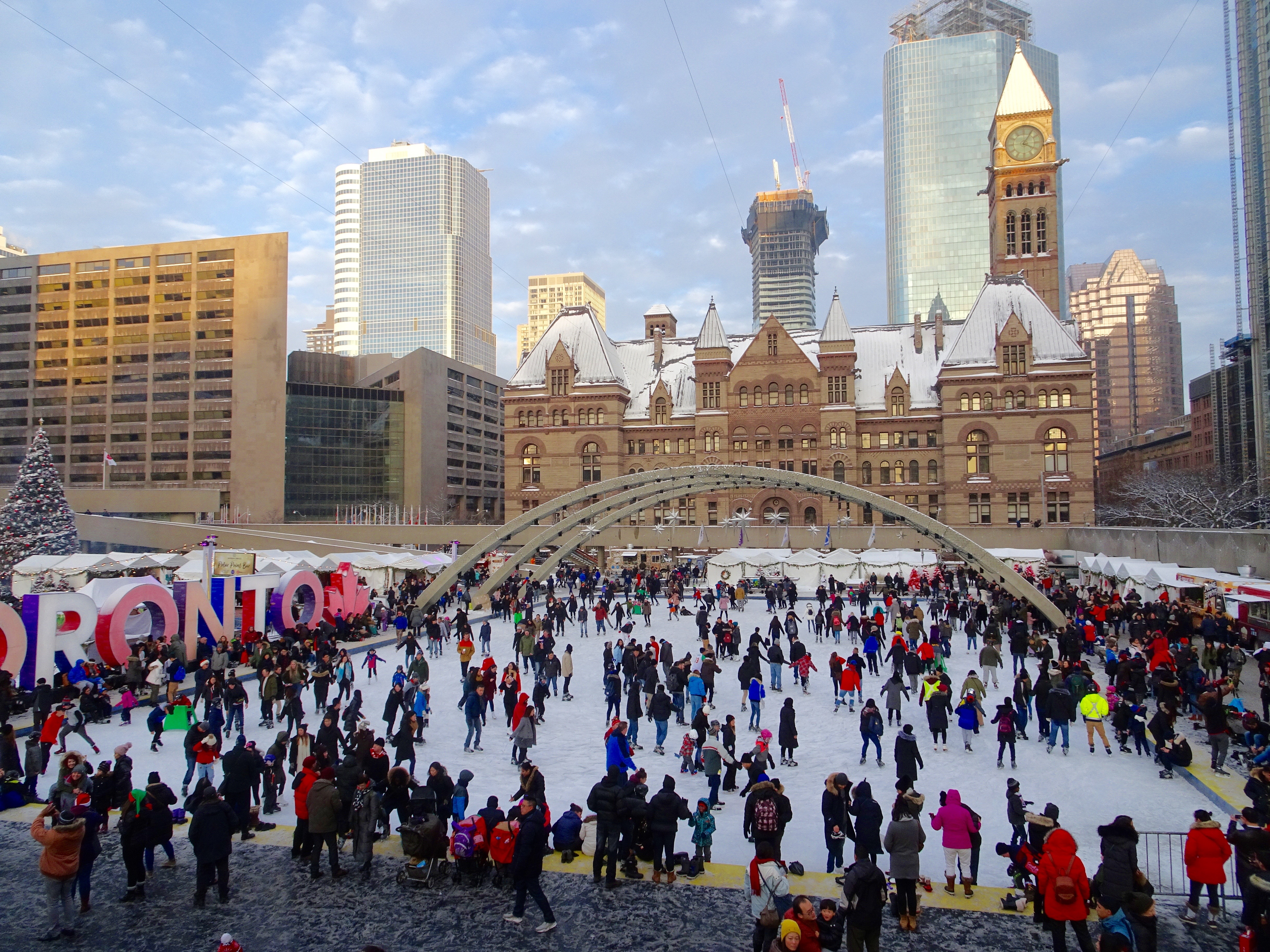
Nathan Phillips Square is the city's main square. The square includes a reflecting pool that is converted into an ice rink during the winter.

Toronto has diverse public spaces, from city squares to public parks overlooking ravines. Nathan Phillips Square is the city's main square in downtown, contains the Toronto Sign, and forms the entrance to City Hall. Sankofa Square, near City Hall, has also gained attention in recent years as one of the busiest gathering spots in the city. Other squares include Maple Leaf Square, next to Scotiabank Arena, and the civic squares at the former city halls of the defunct Metropolitan Toronto, most notably Mel Lastman Square in North York.

There are many large downtown parks, which include Allan Gardens, Christie Pits, Grange Park, Little Norway Park, Moss Park, Queen's Park, Riverdale Park and Trinity Bellwoods Park. An almost-hidden park is the compact Cloud Gardens, which has both open areas and a glassed-in greenhouse, near Queen Street and Yonge Street. South of downtown are two large parks on the waterfront: Tommy Thompson Park on the Leslie Street Spit, which has a nature preserve and is open on weekends, and the Toronto Islands, accessible from downtown by ferry.

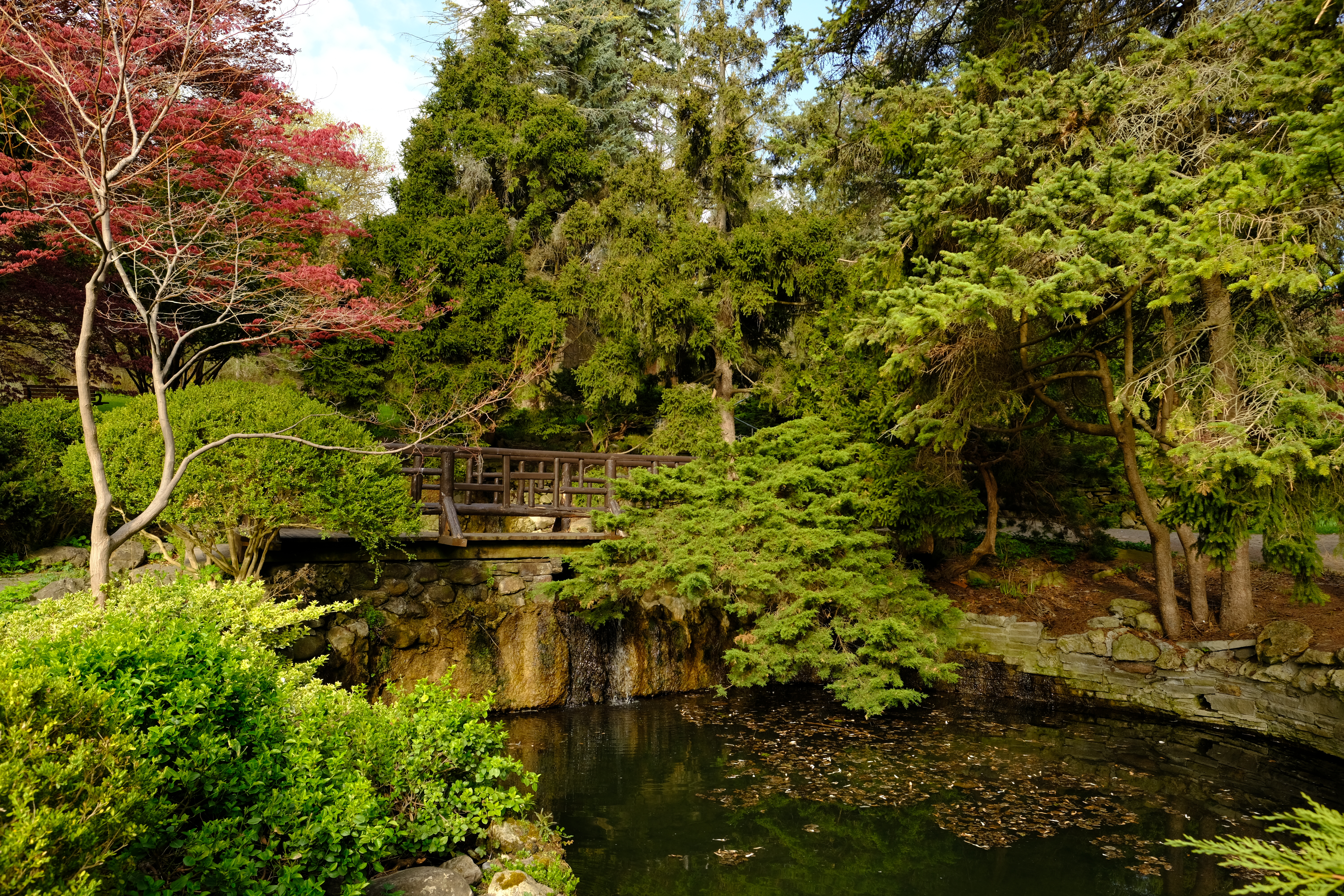
James Gardens, a botanical garden operated by Toronto Parks and Recreation Division

Large parks in the outer areas managed by the city include High Park, Humber Bay Park, Centennial Park (Etobicoke), Downsview Park, Guild Park and Gardens, Sunnybrook Park and Morningside Park (Scarborough). Toronto also operates several public golf courses. Most ravine lands and river bank floodplains in Toronto are public parklands. After Hurricane Hazel in 1954, construction of buildings on floodplains was outlawed, and private lands were bought for conservation. In 1999, Downsview Park, a former military base in North York, initiated an international design competition to realize its vision of creating Canada's first urban park. Approximately 8,000 hectares (20,000 acres), or 12.5 per cent of Toronto's land base, is maintained parkland. Morningside Park in Scarborough is the largest park managed by the city, which is 241.46 hectares (596.7 acres) in size.

In addition to public parks managed by the municipal government, parts of Rouge National Urban Park, the largest urban park in North America, is in the eastern portion of Toronto. Managed by Parks Canada, the national park is centred around the Rouge River and encompasses several municipalities in the Greater Toronto Area.

=== Environmental issues ===
As Toronto grew, it has faced numerous environmental issues such as air and water pollution, as well as light pollution.

== Demographics ==
Population history of Toronto
Year	Pop.	±%
1834	9,252	—
1841	14,249	+54.0%
1851	30,776	+116.0%
1861	44,821	+45.6%
1871	56,092	+25.1%
1881	86,415	+54.1%
1891	144,023	+66.7%
1901	238,080	+65.3%
1911	381,383	+60.2%
1921	521,893	+36.8%
1931	856,955	+64.2%
1941	951,549	+11.0%
1951	1,176,622	+23.7%
1961	1,824,481	+55.1%
1971	2,089,729	+14.5%
1976	2,124,291	+1.7%
1981	2,137,395	+0.6%
1986	2,192,721	+2.6%
1991	2,275,771	+3.8%
1996	2,385,421	+4.8%
2001	2,481,494	+4.0%
2006	2,503,281	+0.9%
2011	2,615,060	+4.5%
2016	2,731,571	+4.5%
2021	2,794,356	+2.3%

In the 2021 Census of Population conducted by Statistics Canada, Toronto had a population of 2,794,356 living in 1,160,892 of its 1,253,238 total private dwellings, a change of 2.3 per cent from its 2016 population of 2,731,571. With a land area of 631.1 km^{2} (243.7 sq mi), it had a population density of 4,427.8/km^{2} (11,467.8/sq mi) in 2021.

At the census metropolitan area (CMA) level in the 2021 census, the Toronto CMA had a population of 6,202,225 living in 2,262,473 of its 2,394,205 total private dwellings, a change of 4.6 per cent from its 2016 population of 5,928,040. With a land area of 5,902.75 km^{2} (2,279.06 sq mi), it had a population density of 1,050.7/km^{2} (2,721.4/sq mi) in 2021.

The city is the anchor of the Golden Horseshoe, an urban agglomeration surrounding the western end of Lake Ontario with a population of 9,765,188 people in 2021 and an estimated population of 11,139,265 people in 2024.

In 2016, persons aged 14 years and under made up 14.5 per cent of the population, and those aged 65 and over made up 15.6 per cent. The median age was 39.3 years. The city's gender population is 48 per cent male and 52 per cent female. Women outnumber men in all age groups 15 and older.

The 2021 census reported that immigrants (individuals born outside Canada) comprise 1,286,140 persons or 46.6 per cent of the total population of Toronto. Of the total immigrant population, the top countries of origin were Philippines (132,980 persons or 10.3%), China (129,755 persons or 10.1%), India (102,155 persons or 7.9%), Sri Lanka (47,895 persons or 3.7%), Jamaica (42,650 persons or 3.3%), Italy (37,700 persons or 2.9%), Iran (37,190 persons or 2.9%), Hong Kong (36,850 persons or 2.9%), United Kingdom (35,585 persons or 2.8%), and Portugal (34,360 persons or 2.7%).

The city's foreign-born persons comprised 47 per cent of the population, compared to 49.9 per cent in 2006. According to the United Nations Development Programme, Toronto has the second-highest percentage of constant foreign-born population among world cities, after Miami, Florida. While Miami's foreign-born population has traditionally consisted primarily of Cubans and other Latin Americans, no single nationality or culture dominates Toronto's immigrant population, placing it among the most diverse cities in the world. In 2010, it was estimated over 100,000 immigrants arrived in the Greater Toronto Area each year.

=== Race and ethnicity ===
In 2016, the three most commonly reported ethnic origins overall were Chinese (332,830 or 12.5 per cent), English (331,890 or 12.3 per cent) and Canadian (323,175 or 12.0 per cent). Common regions of ethnic origin were European (47.9 per cent), Asian (including Middle-Eastern – 40.1 per cent), African (5.5 per cent), Latin/Central/South American (4.2 per cent), and North American aboriginal (1.2 per cent).

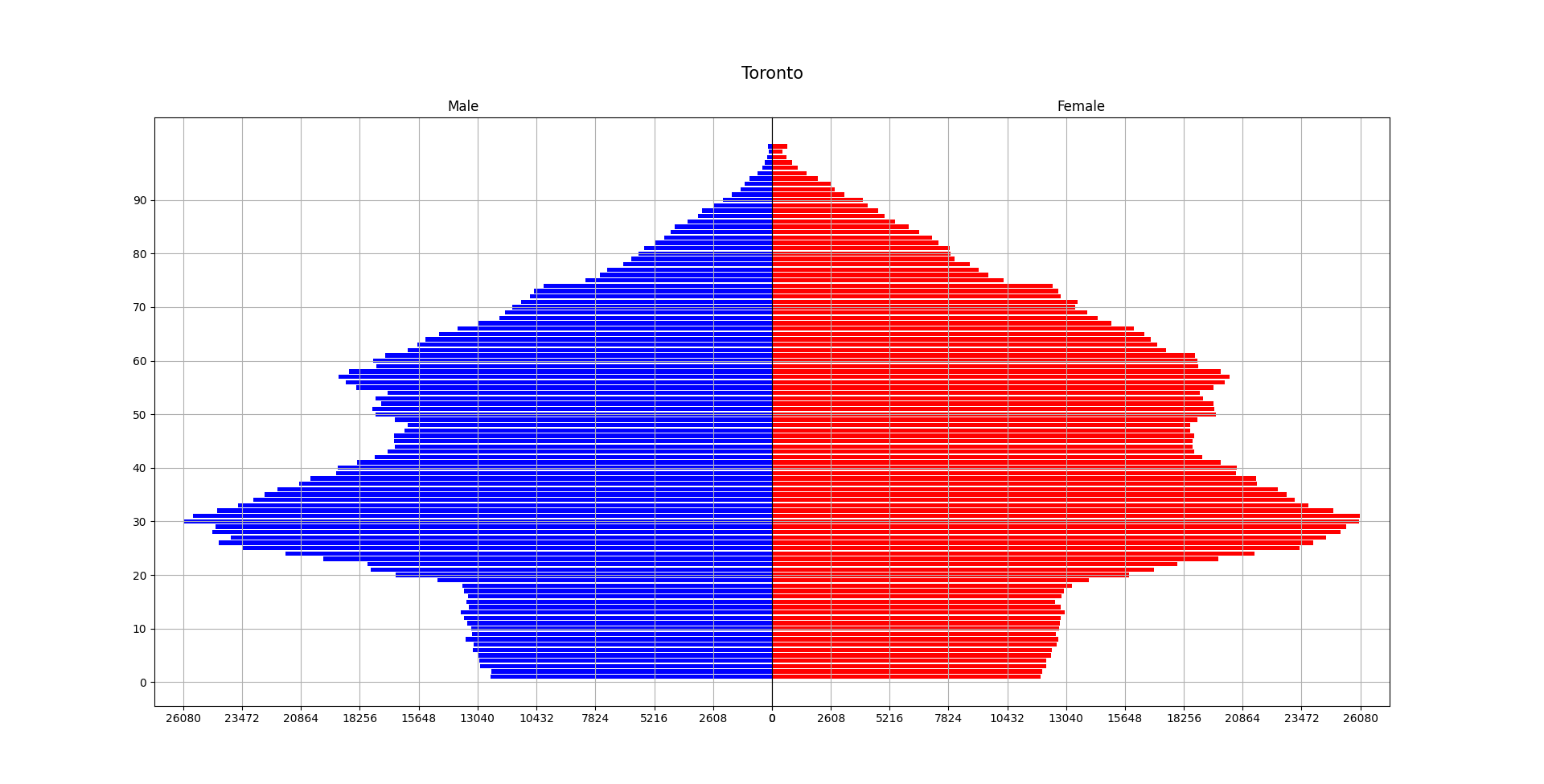
Population pyramid of Toronto from the 2021 Canadian census

In 2016, 51.5 per cent of the residents of the city proper belonged to a visible minority group, compared to 49.1 per cent in 2011, and 13.6 per cent in 1981. The largest visible minority groups were South Asian (Indian, Pakistani, Sri Lankan at 338,960 or 12.6 per cent), East Asian (Chinese at 332,830 or 12.5 per cent), and Black (239,850 or 8.9 per cent). Visible minorities are projected to increase to 63 per cent of the city's population by 2031.

This diversity is reflected in Toronto's ethnic neighbourhoods, which include the Chinatowns, Corso Italia, Greektown, Kensington Market, Koreatown, Little India, Little Italy, Little Jamaica, Little Portugal and Roncesvalles (Polish community).

== Economy ==
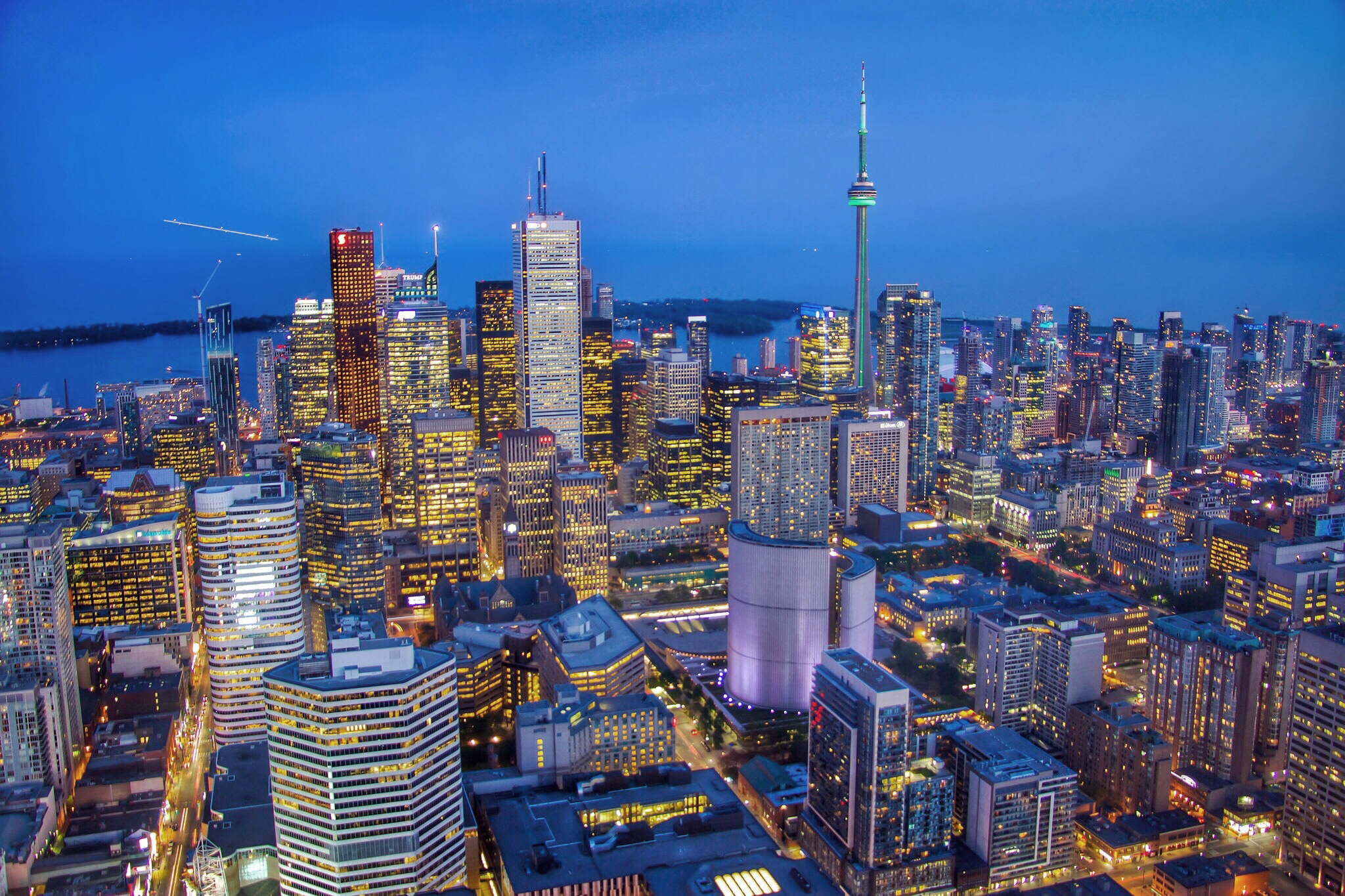
View looking towards Toronto's Financial District

Toronto is an international centre for business and finance. Generally considered the financial and industrial capital of Canada, Toronto has a high concentration of banks and brokerage firms on Bay Street in the Financial District. The Toronto Stock Exchange is the world's seventh-largest stock exchange by market capitalization. The five largest financial institutions of Canada, collectively known as the Big Five, all have their global corporate headquarters in Toronto, alongside Canada's major insurance giants.

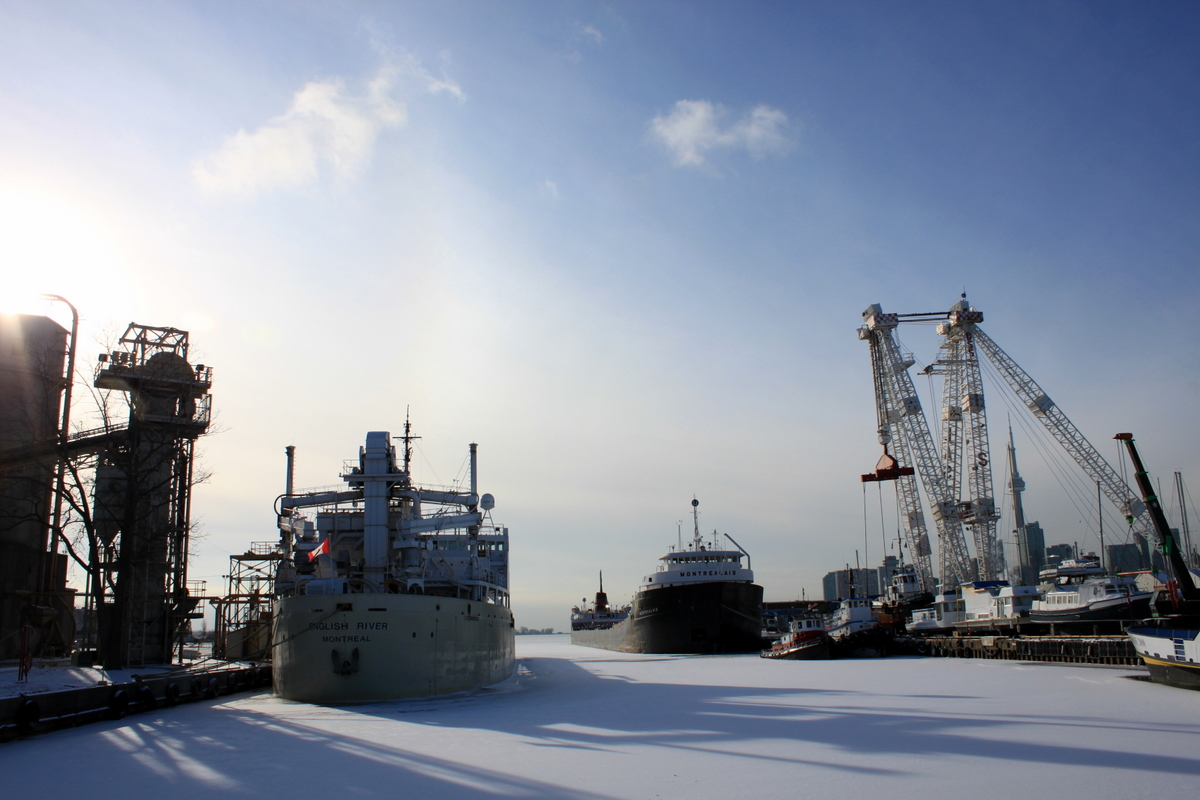
Lake freighters moored in the Port of Toronto

The city is an important centre for the media, publishing, telecommunication, information technology and film production industries; it is home to Bell Media, Rogers Communications, and Torstar. Other prominent Canadian corporations and Canadian subsidiaries of international corporations in the Greater Toronto Area include Magna International, Pizza Pizza, Mr. Sub, Recipe Unlimited, Celestica, Manulife, Sun Life Financial, Toyota Canada Inc., and major hotel companies and operators, such as Four Seasons Hotels and Fairmont Hotels & Resorts.

Although much of the region's manufacturing activities occur outside the city limits, Toronto continues to be a wholesale and distribution point for the industrial sector. The city's strategic position along the Quebec City–Windsor Corridor within the Great Lakes megalopolis and its road and rail connections help support the nearby production of motor vehicles, iron, steel, food, machinery, chemicals and paper. The completion of the St. Lawrence Seaway in 1959 gave ships access to the Great Lakes from the Atlantic Ocean.

Toronto's unemployment rate was 6.7 per cent as of July 2016. According to the website Numbeo, Toronto's cost of living plus rent index was second highest in Canada (of 31 cities). The local purchasing power was the sixth lowest in Canada, mid-2017. The average monthly social assistance caseload for January to October 2014 was 92,771. The number of impoverished seniors increased from 10.5 per cent in 2011 to 12.1 per cent in 2014. Toronto's 2013 child poverty rate was 28.6 per cent, the highest among large Canadian cities of 500,000 or more residents.

=== Bay Street ===
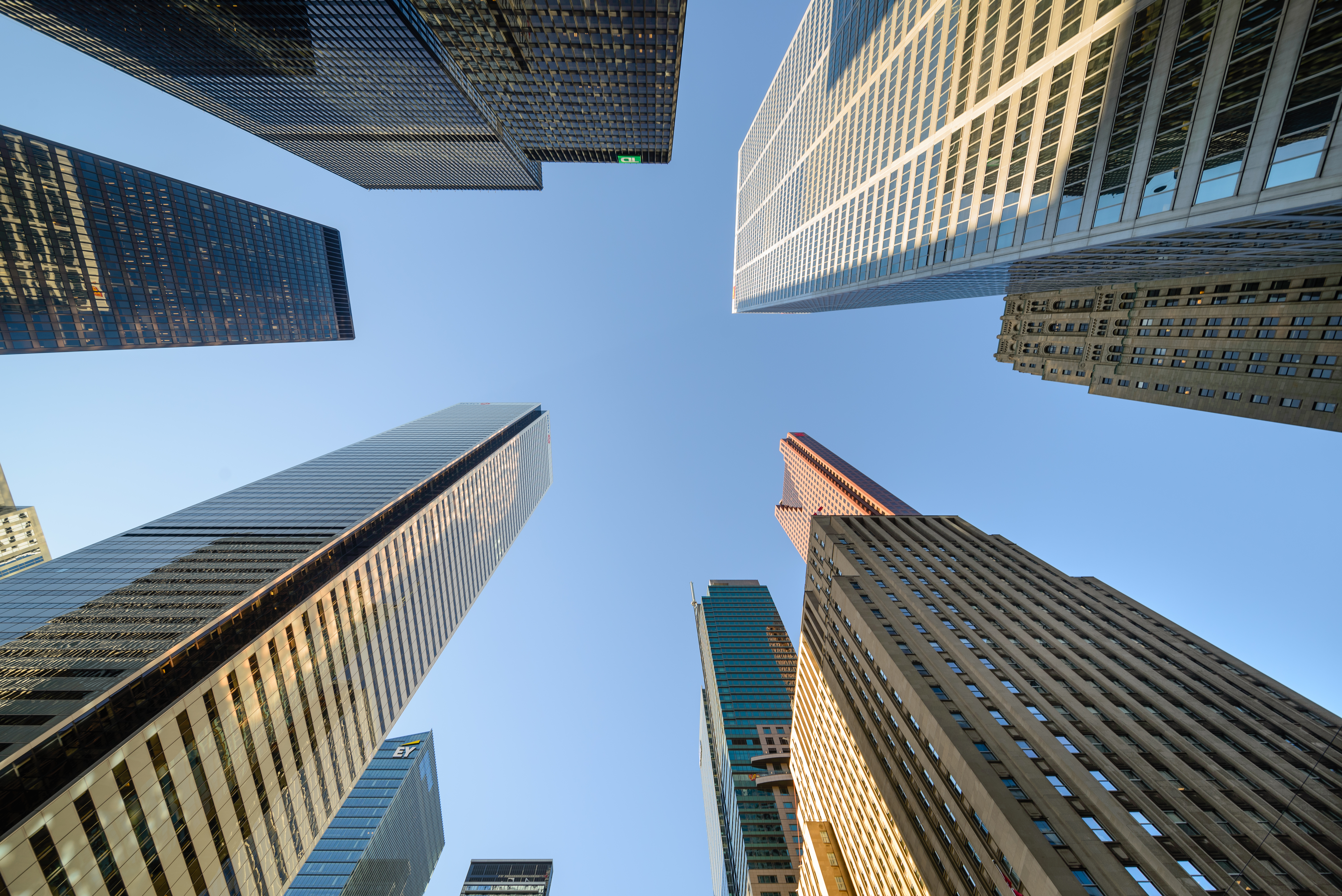
Buildings in the Financial District, including the operational headquarters of three major Canadian banks

The Financial District in Toronto centres on Bay Street, the equivalent to Wall Street in New York. The city hosts the headquarters of all five of Canada's largest banks, Royal Bank of Canada, Toronto-Dominion Bank, Scotiabank, Bank of Montreal and Canadian Imperial Bank of Commerce, and was ranked as the safest banking system in the world between 2007 and 2014 according to the World Economic Forum. Toronto's economy has seen a steady growth boom thanks to many corporations relocating their Canadian headquarters into the city and Canada's growing cultural significance, resulting in several companies setting up shop in Toronto.

=== Media and entertainment ===
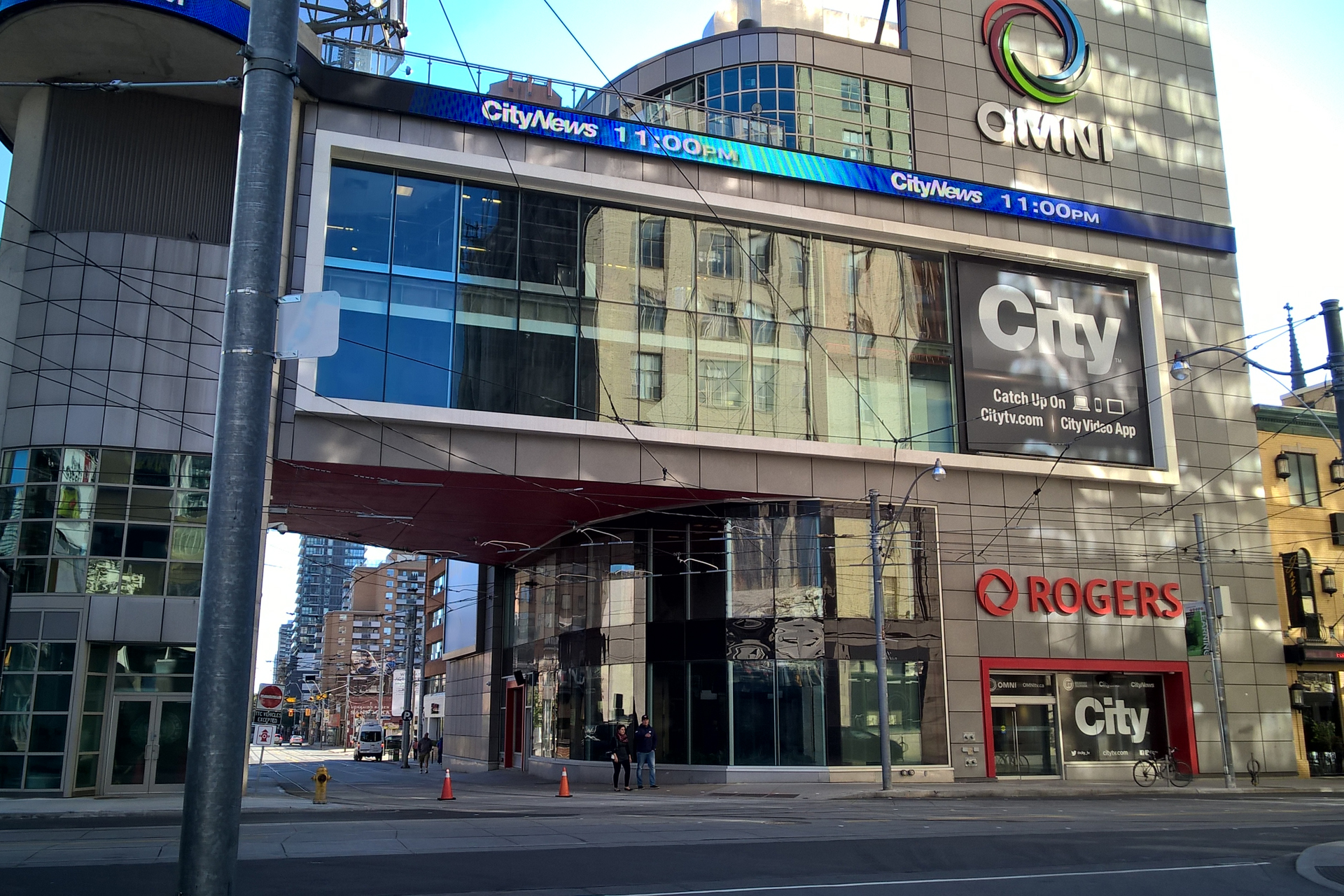
33 Dundas Street East is a former studio complex used by Citytv and Omni Television

Toronto is Canada's largest media market, and has four conventional dailies, two alt-weeklies, and three free commuter papers in a greater metropolitan area of about 6 million inhabitants. The Toronto Star and the Toronto Sun are the prominent daily city newspapers, while national dailies The Globe and Mail and the National Post are also headquartered in the city. The Toronto Star, The Globe and Mail, and National Post are broadsheet newspapers. Several magazines and local newspapers cover Toronto, including Now and Toronto Life, while numerous magazines are produced in Toronto, such as Canadian Business, Chatelaine, Flare and Maclean's. Daily Hive, Western Canada's largest online-only publication, opened its Toronto office in 2016 after acquiring Torontoist from Gothamist. Toronto contains the headquarters of the major English-language Canadian television networks CBC, CTV, Citytv, Global, The Sports Network (TSN) and Sportsnet.

==== Film production ====
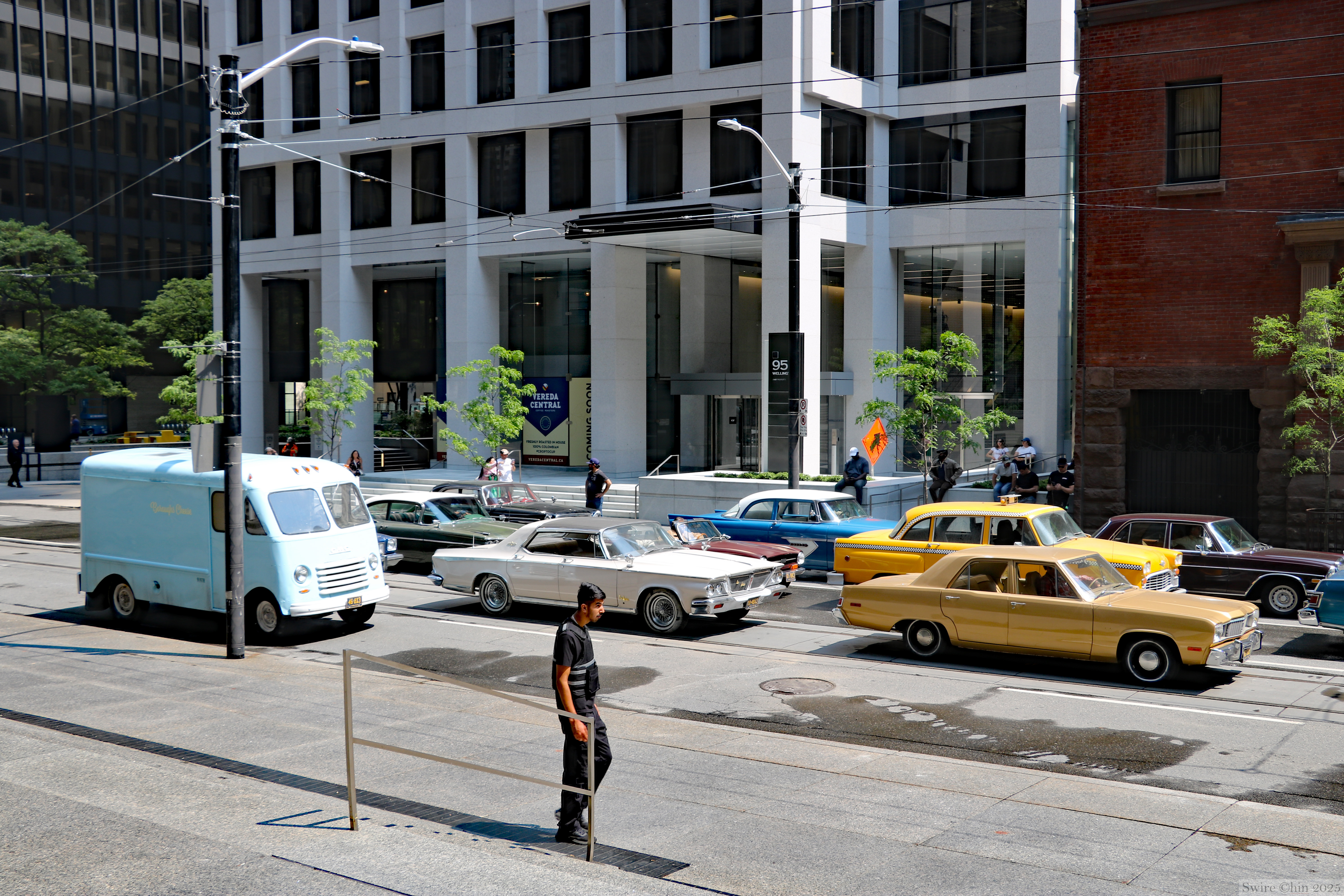
Film production on Wellington Street in 2025

Toronto is one of the centres of Canada's film and television industry due in part to the lower cost of production in Canada. The city's streets and landmarks are seen in a variety of films, mimicking the scenes of American cities such as Chicago and New York. The city provides diverse settings and neighbourhoods to shoot films with production facilitated by Toronto's Film and Television Office. Lower Bay station, the abandoned lower platform of Bay station, is used for filming subway scenes. Toronto's film industry has extended beyond the Toronto CMA into adjoining cities such as Hamilton and Oshawa.

=== Real estate ===
Real estate is a major force in the city's economy; Toronto is home to some of the nation's—and the world's—most expensive real estate, especially since the Canadian property bubble. The Toronto Regional Real Estate Board (TRREB), formerly the Toronto Real Estate Board, is a non-profit professional association of registered real estate brokers and salespeople in Toronto, and parts of the Greater Toronto Area. TRREB was formed in 1920. Many large real estate investment trusts are based in Toronto.

=== Technology and biotech ===
Toronto is a large hub of the Canadian and global technology industry, generating $52 billion in revenues annually. In 2017, Toronto tech firms offered almost 30,000 jobs, which is higher than the combination of San Francisco Bay area, Seattle and Washington, D.C. The area bound between the Greater Toronto Area, the region of Waterloo and the city of Hamilton was termed a "digital corridor" by the Branham Group, a region highly concentrated with technology companies and jobs similar to Silicon Valley in California. Toronto is home to a large startup ecosystem and is the third-largest centre for information and communications technology in North America, behind New York City and the Silicon Valley. In 2023, the city was ranked as the 17th best startup scene in the world.

=== Tourism ===
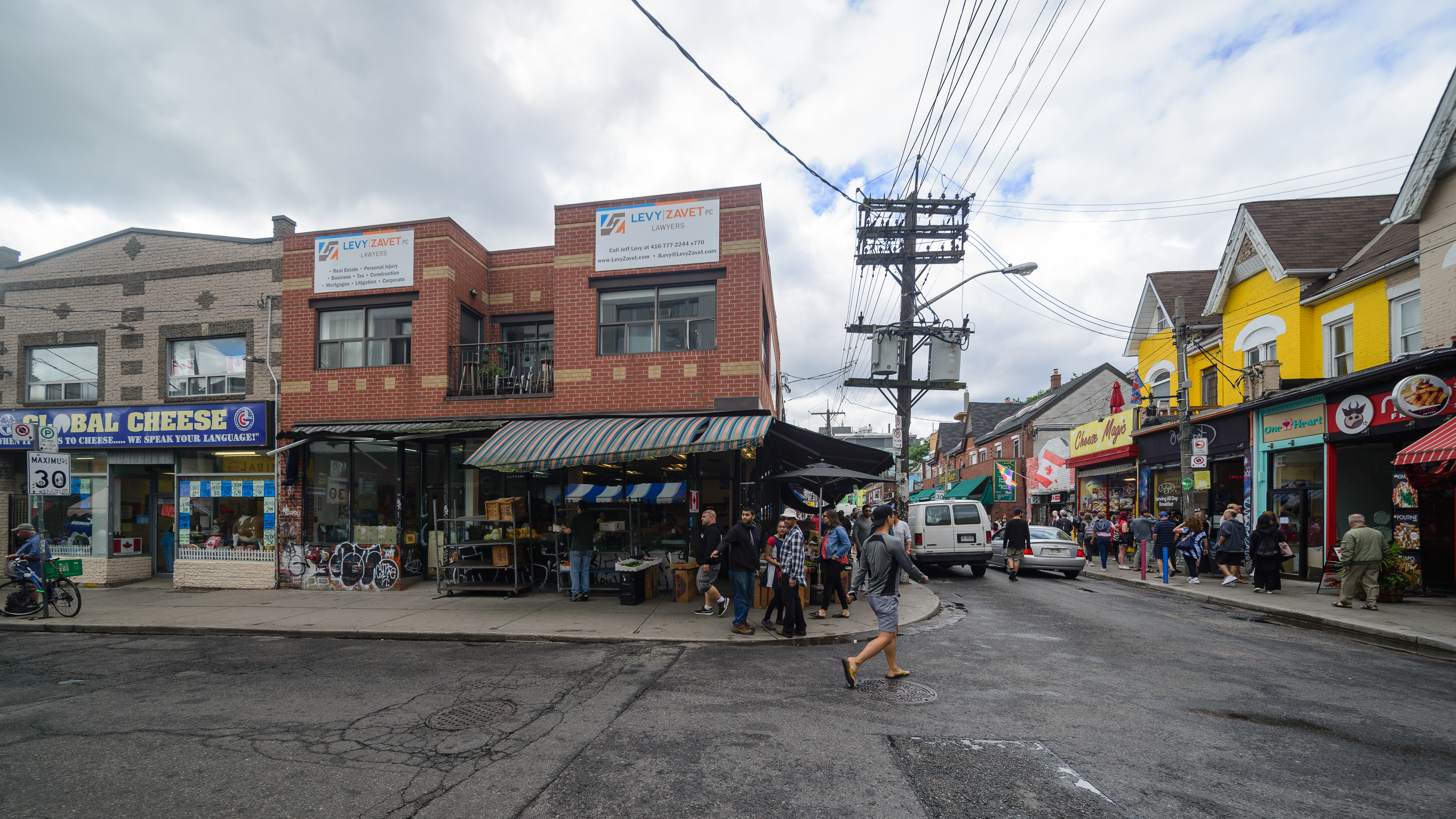
Kensington Market, a neighbourhood that is also partly an outdoor market

In 2018, 27.5 million tourists visited Toronto, generating $10.3 billion (~$13 billion in 2025) in economic activity. The Toronto Eaton Centre receives over 47 million visitors per year. Other commercial areas popular with tourists include the Path network, which is the world's largest underground shopping complex, as well as Kensington Market and St. Lawrence Market. The Toronto Islands are close to downtown Toronto and do not permit private motor vehicles beyond the airport. Other tourist attractions include the CN Tower, Casa Loma, Toronto's theatres and musicals, Sankofa Square, and Ripley's Aquarium of Canada.

The Royal Ontario Museum is a museum of world culture and natural history. The Toronto Zoo is home to over 5,000 animals representing over 460 distinct species. The Art Gallery of Ontario contains an extensive collection of Canadian, European, African and contemporary artwork. Also, it hosts exhibits from museums and galleries from all over the world. The Gardiner Museum of ceramic art is the only museum in Canada entirely devoted to ceramics, and the Museum's collection contains more than 2,900 ceramic works from Asia, the Americas, and Europe. The city also hosts the Bata Shoe Museum and Textile Museum of Canada. The Ontario Science Centre is being relocated from its original Don Mills location within Toronto to the site of Ontario Place.

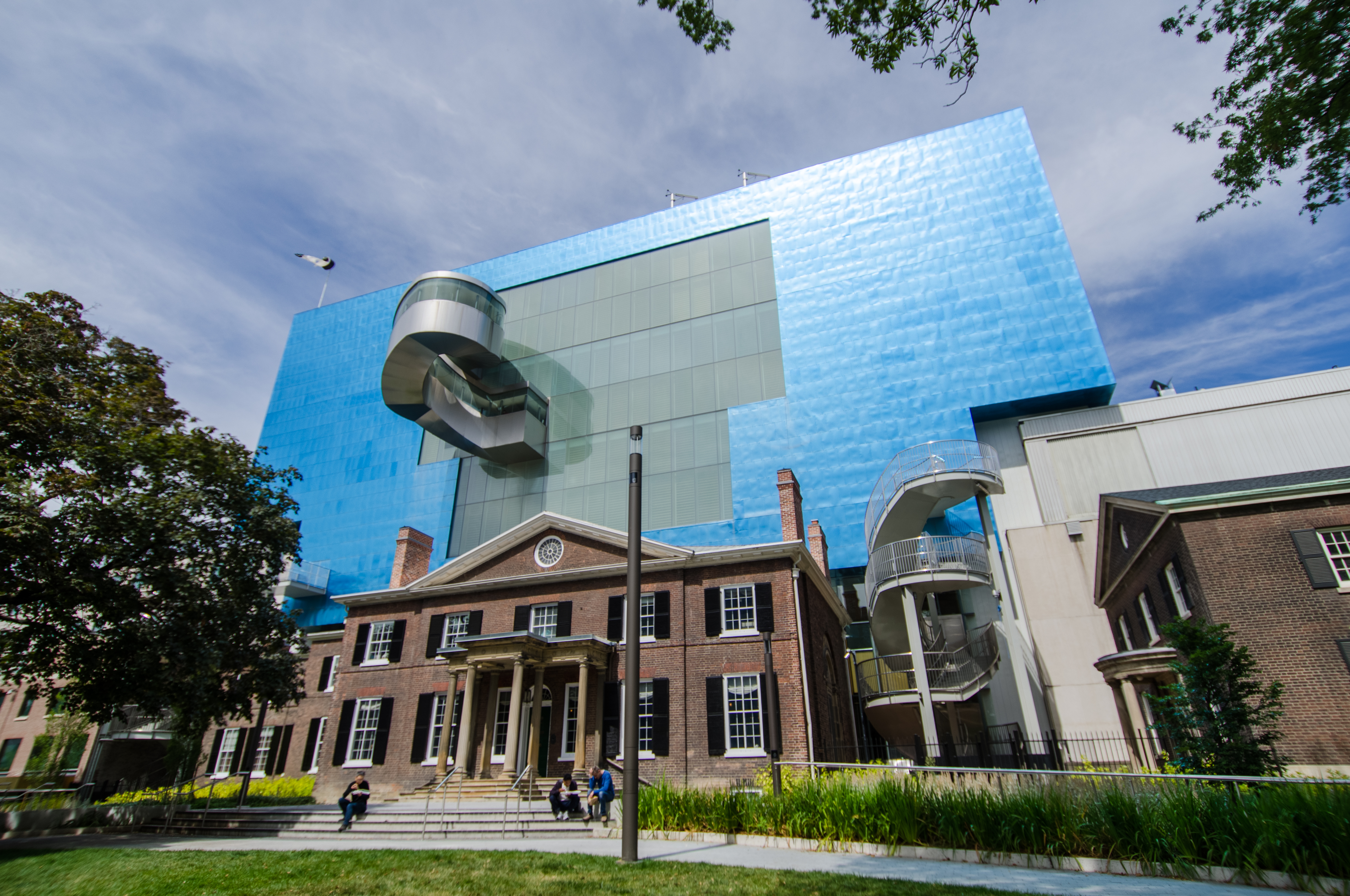
The southern façade of the Art Gallery of Ontario

Other prominent art galleries and museums include the Design Exchange, the TIFF Lightbox, the Museum of Contemporary Art Toronto Canada, the Institute for Contemporary Culture, the Toronto Sculpture Garden, the CBC Museum, the Redpath Sugar Museum, the University of Toronto Art Centre, Hart House, the TD Gallery of Inuit Art, Pocket Planet Canada and the Aga Khan Museum. The city also runs its own museums, which include the Spadina House. The Don Valley Brick Works is a former industrial site that opened in 1889 and was partly restored as a park and heritage site in 1996, with further restoration being completed in stages since then. The Canadian National Exhibition ("The Ex") is held annually at Exhibition Place and is the oldest annual fair in the world. The Ex has an average attendance of 1.25 million.

City shopping areas include the Yorkville neighbourhood, Queen West, Harbourfront, the Entertainment District, the Financial District, and the St. Lawrence Market neighbourhood. The Eaton Centre is Toronto's most popular tourist attraction with over 52 million visitors annually.

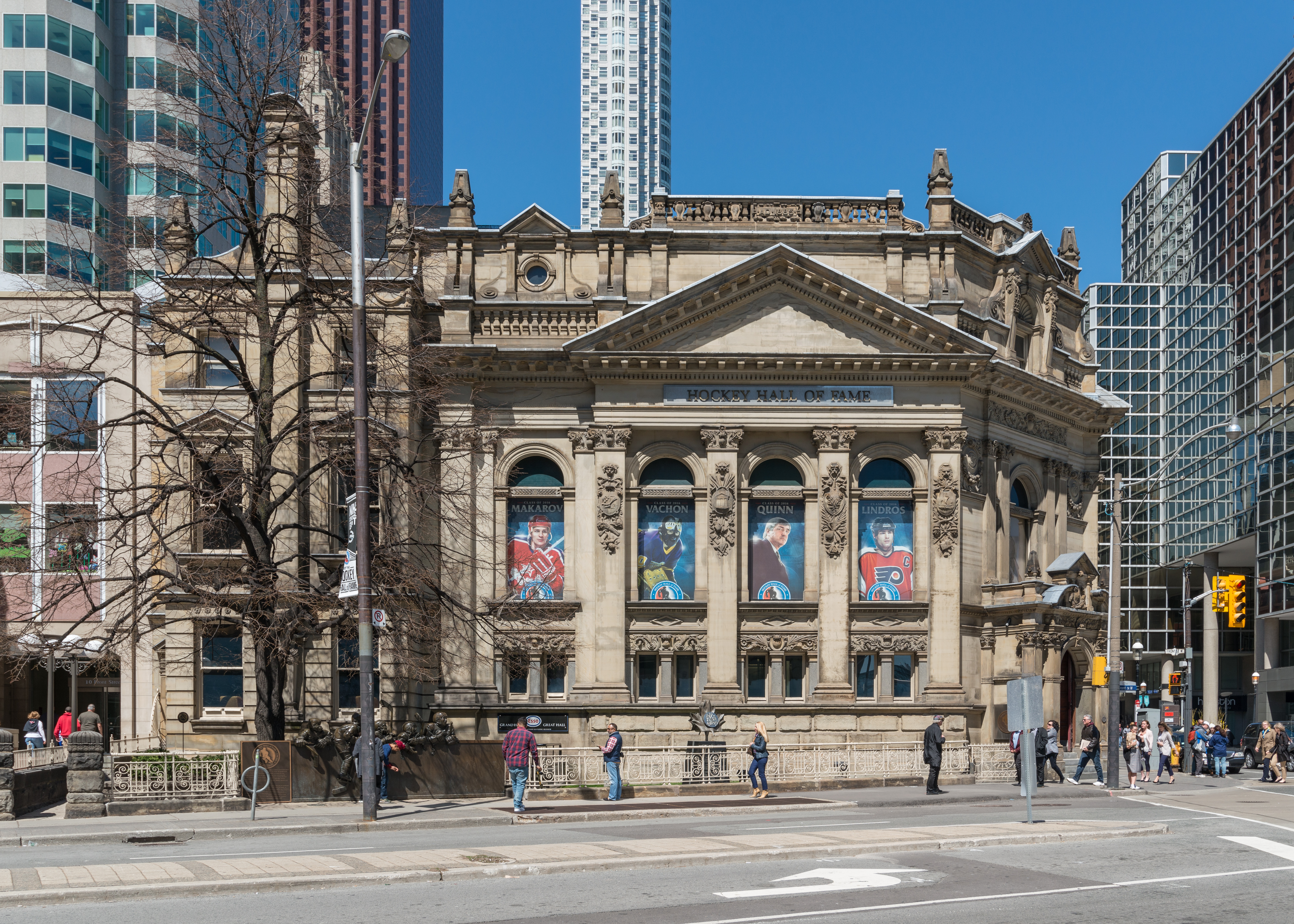
The Hockey Hall of Fame is a museum dedicated to ice hockey, as well as a Hall of Fame

Toronto is also home to Casa Loma, the former estate of Sir Henry Pellatt, a prominent Toronto financier, industrialist and military man. Other notable neighbourhoods and attractions in Toronto include The Beaches, the Toronto Islands, Kensington Market, Fort York, and the Hockey Hall of Fame.

== Education ==
=== Primary and secondary education ===
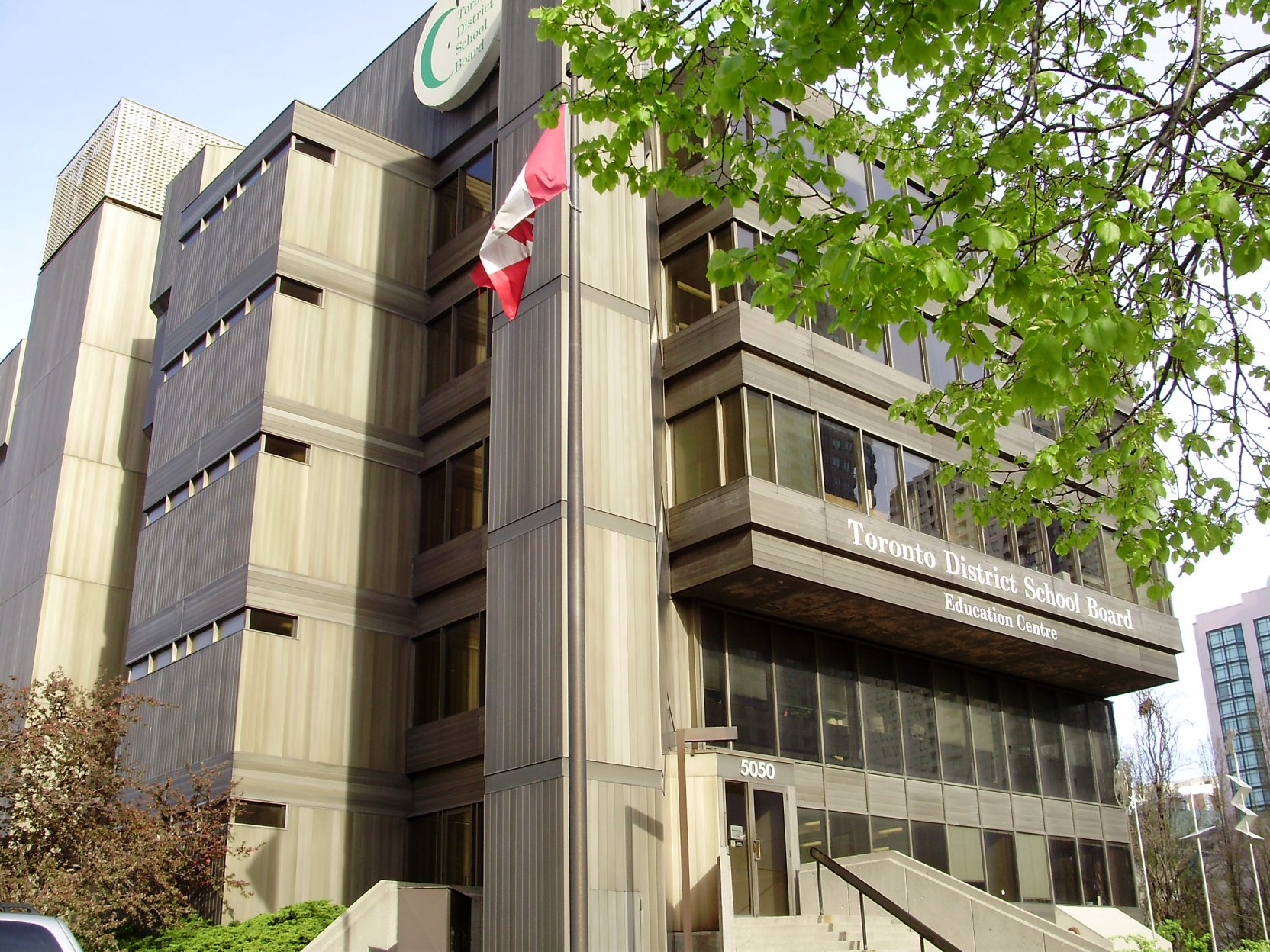
Headquarters for the Toronto District School Board, one of four public school boards that operate in the city

There are four public school boards that provide elementary and secondary education in Toronto, the Conseil scolaire catholique MonAvenir, the Conseil scolaire Viamonde (CSV), the Toronto Catholic District School Board (TCDSB), and the Toronto District School Board (TDSB). CSV and TDSB are secular public school boards, whereas MonAvenir and TCDSB are separate public school boards. CSV and MonAvenir are French first language school boards, whereas TCDSB and TDSB are English first language school boards.

TDSB operates the most schools among the four Toronto-based school boards, with 451 elementary schools, 105 secondary schools, and five adult learning centres. TCDSB operates 163 elementary schools, 29 secondary schools, three combined institutions, and one adult learning centre. CSV operates 11 elementary schools, and three secondary schools in the city. MonAvenir operates nine elementary schools, and three secondary schools in Toronto.

=== Postsecondary education ===
There are several public universities and colleges based in Toronto. The city is also home to several supplementary schools, seminaries, and vocational schools. Examples of such institutions include The Royal Conservatory of Music, which includes the Glenn Gould School; the Canadian Film Centre, a media training institute founded by filmmaker Norman Jewison; and Tyndale University, a Christian post-secondary institution and Canada's largest seminary.

==== Universities ====
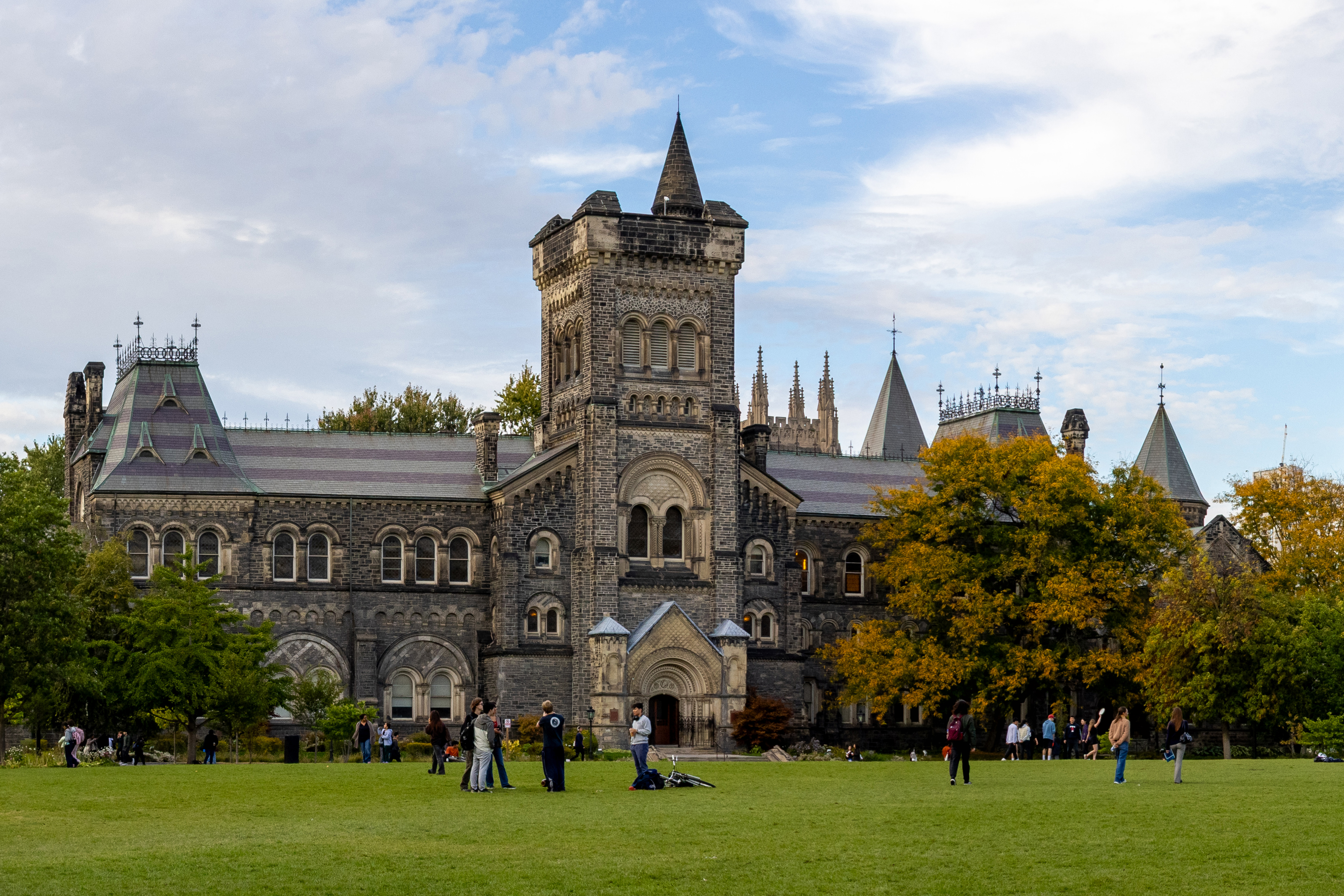
University College on the University of Toronto's St. George campus. University College is one of eleven constituent colleges of the University of Toronto.

Five public universities are based in Toronto. Four of these universities are based in downtown Toronto: OCAD University, Toronto Metropolitan University, the Université de l'Ontario français, and the University of Toronto. The University of Toronto is the largest post-secondary institution in Canada and has three campuses; its St. George campus is in the downtown core while its other two are located in the city's eastern district of Scarborough and the neighbouring city of Mississauga respectively. York University is the only Toronto-based university not situated in downtown Toronto, maintaining a primary campus in the northwestern portion of North York, a secondary campus in midtown Toronto, and a third campus in the city of Markham.

Several other public universities based elsewhere in Ontario also operate satellite campuses or facilities in Toronto, including Queen's University at Kingston, the University of Ottawa, the University of Western Ontario, Wilfrid Laurier University, and the University of Guelph. The latter operates a satellite campus in northwestern Etobicoke together with Humber Polytechnic, called the University of Guelph-Humber. In addition to public universities, Toronto also holds a satellite campus for Northeastern University, a private university based in Boston.

==== Colleges ====
There are four public colleges based in Toronto: Centennial College, George Brown Polytechnic (formerly George Brown College), Humber Polytechnic (formerly Humber College), and Seneca Polytechnic (formerly Seneca College). The four institutions operate several campuses throughout the city. Several public colleges based elsewhere in Ontario also operate satellite facilities and campuses in Toronto, including Cambrian College, Canadore College, Collège Boréal, Collège La Cité, Fleming College, Georgian College, Lambton College, Loyalist College, Niagara College, St. Clair College, and Sault College.

== Human resources ==
=== Public health ===
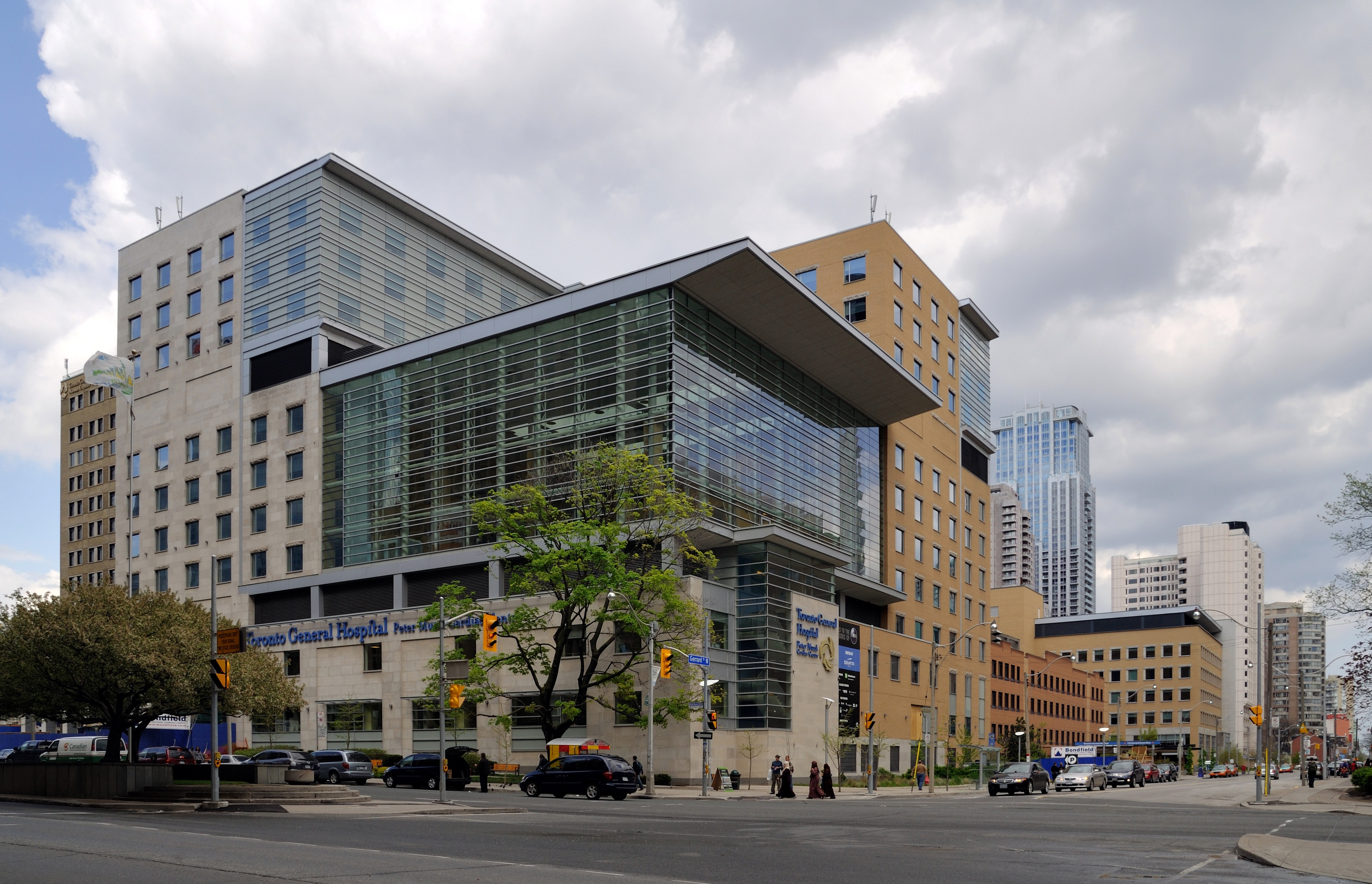
Toronto General Hospital is a major teaching hospital in downtown Toronto

Toronto is home to twenty public hospitals, including The Hospital for Sick Children, Mount Sinai Hospital, St. Michael's Hospital, North York General Hospital, Toronto General Hospital, Toronto Western Hospital, Etobicoke General Hospital, St. Joseph's Health Centre, Scarborough General Hospital, Birchmount Hospital, Centenary Hospital, Sunnybrook Health Sciences Centre, Centre for Addiction and Mental Health (CAMH), and Princess Margaret Cancer Centre, many of which are affiliated with the Temerty Faculty of Medicine of the University of Toronto.

Specialized hospitals include the Baycrest Health Sciences geriatric hospital, the Holland Bloorview Kids Rehabilitation Hospital for children with disabilities, and Casey House, which cares for people living with, or at risk of contracting, AIDS.

Toronto's Discovery District is a centre of research in biomedicine. It is on a 2.5-square-kilometre (620-acre) research park that is integrated into Toronto's downtown core. It is also home to the MaRS Discovery District, which was created in 2000 to capitalize on the research and innovation strength of the province of Ontario. Another institute is the McLaughlin Centre for Molecular Medicine (MCMM).

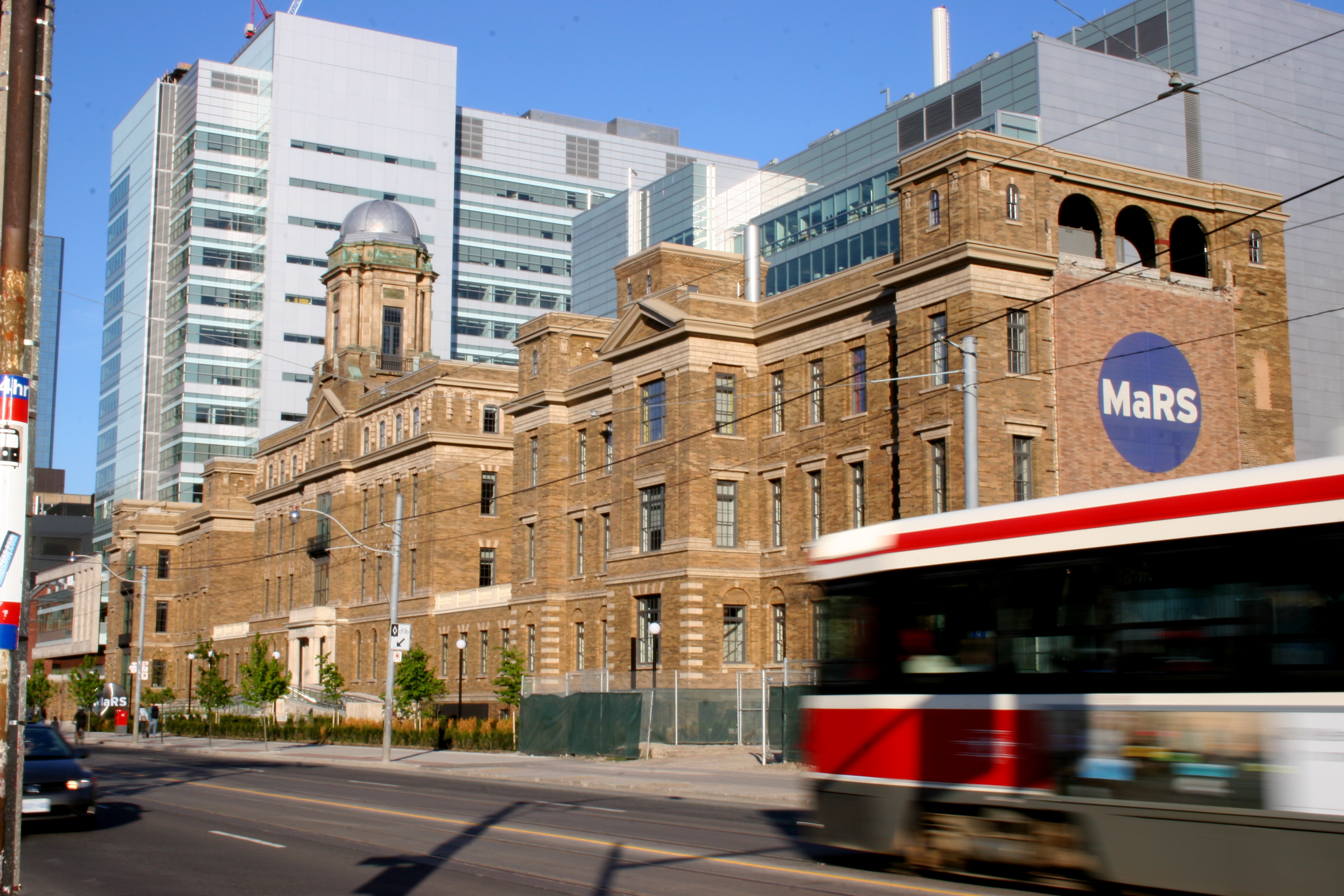
MaRS Discovery District building at College Street. The organization is a medical research trust.

Toronto is also host to a wide variety of health-focused non-profit organizations that work to address specific illnesses for Toronto, Ontario and Canadian residents. Organizations include Crohn's and Colitis Canada, the Heart and Stroke Foundation of Canada, the Canadian Cancer Society, the Alzheimer Society of Canada, and Alzheimer Society of Ontario, all located in the same office at Yonge–Eglinton, the Leukemia & Lymphoma Society of Canada, the Canadian Breast Cancer Foundation, the Canadian Foundation for AIDS Research, Cystic Fibrosis Canada, the Canadian Mental Health Association, and the ALS Society of Canada.

In 2022, 187 homeless people died in Toronto, with 47 per cent dying of drug toxicity, the leading cause. Toronto Public Health described it as an "urgent public health issue", and has responded by opening supervised drug consumption sites, and by advocating for the allowance of personal drug possession. In 2024 the Community Care and Recovery Act was passed by the Ontario government and Toronto Public Health was directed to close its supervised consumption sites. As of April 1, 2025, Toronto Public Health no longer offers supervised consumption services. Some supervised consumption sites, not operated by Toronto Public Health, remain open.

=== Public library ===
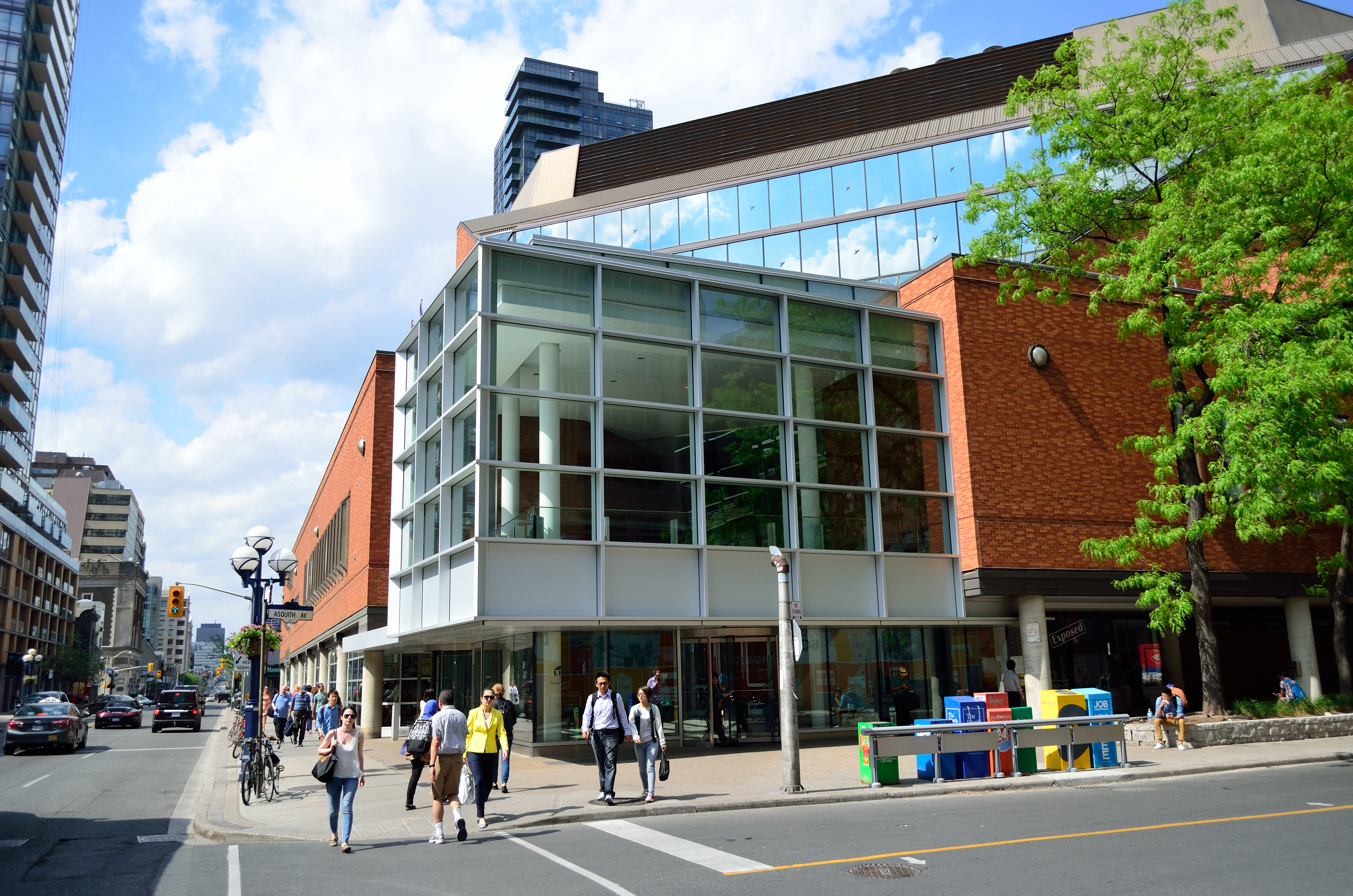
The Toronto Reference Library, the largest branch operated by Toronto Public Library and the de facto main branch of the library system

Toronto Public Library is the largest public library system in Canada. In 2008, it averaged a higher circulation per capita than any other public library system internationally, making it the largest neighbourhood-based library system in the world. Within North America, it also had the highest circulation and visitors when compared to other large urban systems.

Established as the library of the Mechanics' Institute in 1830, the Toronto Public Library now consists of 100 branch libraries and has over 12 million items in its collection.

== Culture and contemporary life ==
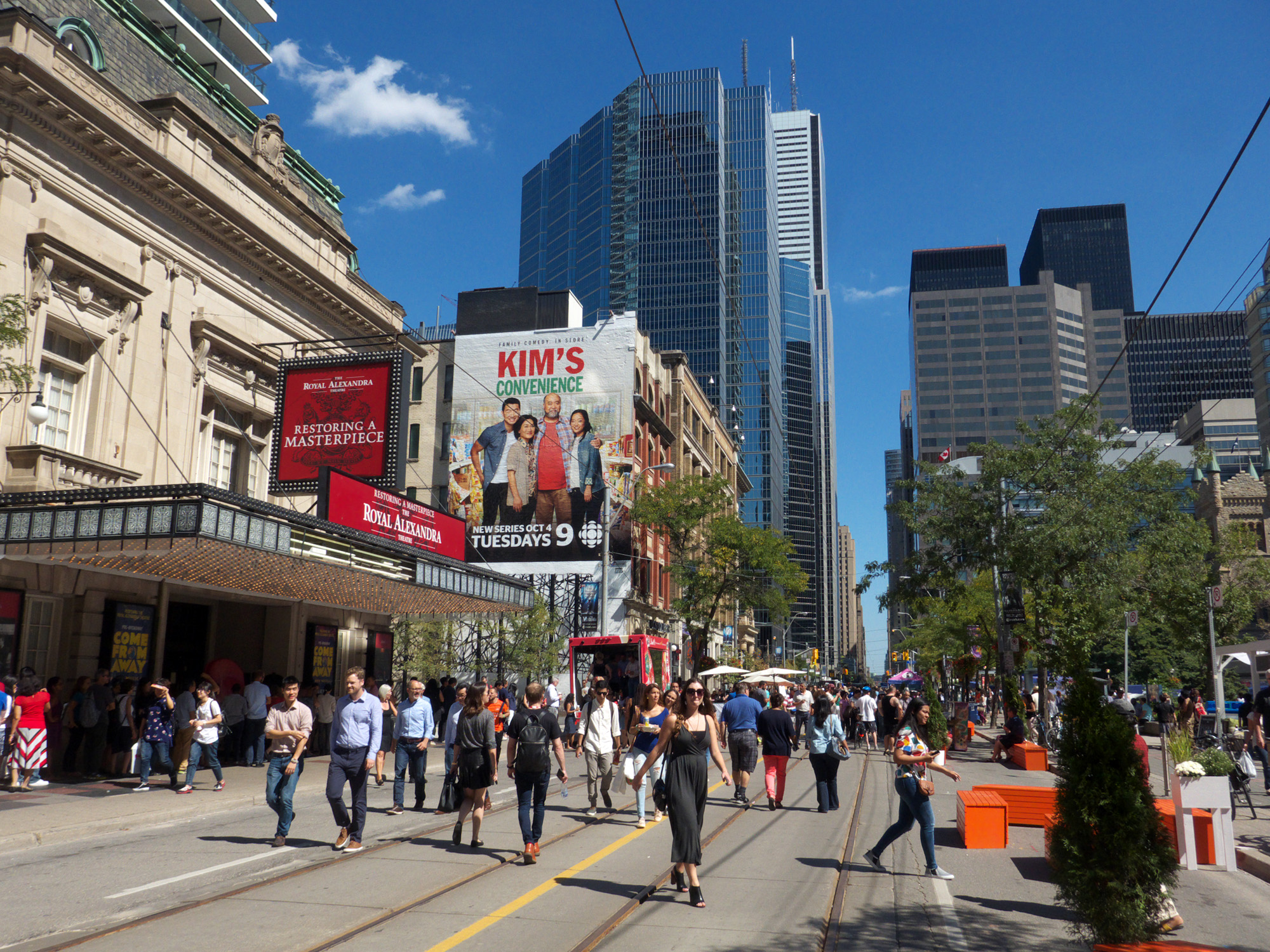
Crowds walk past the Royal Alexandra Theatre during the Toronto International Film Festival

Toronto's theatre and performing arts scene has more than fifty ballet and dance companies, six opera companies, two symphony orchestras, many music venues, and a host of theatres. The city is home to the National Ballet of Canada, the Canadian Opera Company, the Toronto Symphony Orchestra, the Canadian Electronic Ensemble, and the Canadian Stage Company. Notable performance venues include the Four Seasons Centre for the Performing Arts, Roy Thomson Hall, the Princess of Wales Theatre, the Royal Alexandra Theatre, Massey Hall, the Meridian Arts Centre (formerly the Toronto Centre for the Arts), the Elgin and Winter Garden Theatres, and the Meridian Hall (originally the "O'Keefe Centre" and formerly the "Hummingbird Centre" and the "Sony Centre for the Performing Arts").

Runway model at Toronto Fashion Week in 2009

Toronto Fashion Week (TFW) is a bi-annual fashion show held every February (fall/winter) and September (spring/summer) in the city's prestigious Yorkville neighbourhood.

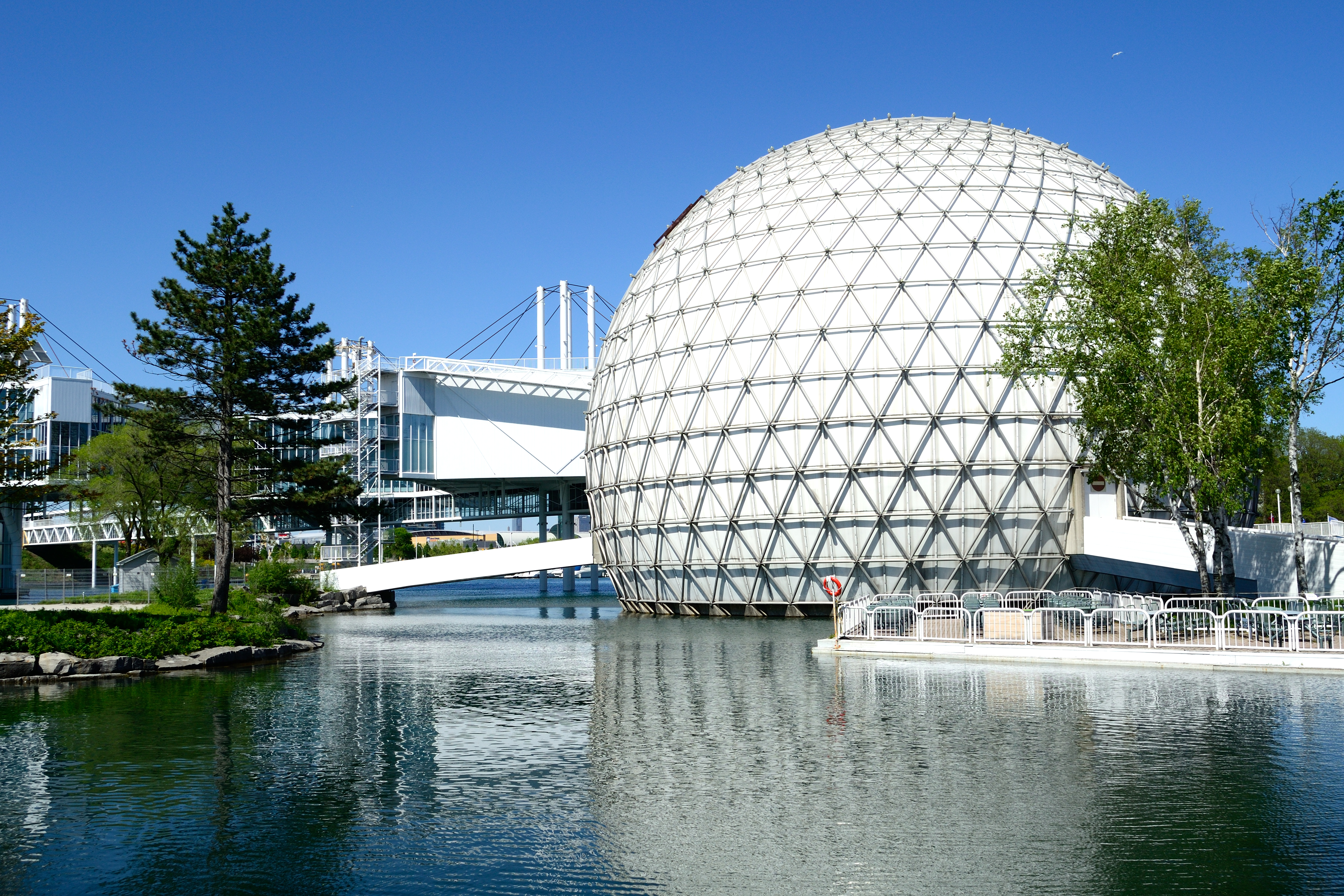
The Cinesphere at Ontario Place

Ontario Place features the world's first permanent IMAX movie theatre, the Cinesphere, as well as the RBC Amphitheatre (formerly Molson Amphitheatre and later Budweiser Stage), an open-air venue for music concerts. In the spring of 2012, Ontario Place closed after declining attendance. Although the RBC Amphitheatre and harbour still operate, the park and Cinesphere are no longer in use. There are ongoing plans to revitalise Ontario Place.

Rogers Stadium is a major concert venue located in Downsview Park.

Canada's Walk of Fame acknowledges the achievements of successful Canadians with a series of stars on designated blocks of sidewalks along King Street and Simcoe Street.

The production of domestic and foreign film and television is a major local industry. As of 2011, Toronto ranks as the third-largest production centre for film and television after Los Angeles and New York City, sharing the nickname "Hollywood North" with Vancouver. The Toronto International Film Festival is an annual event celebrating the international film industry.

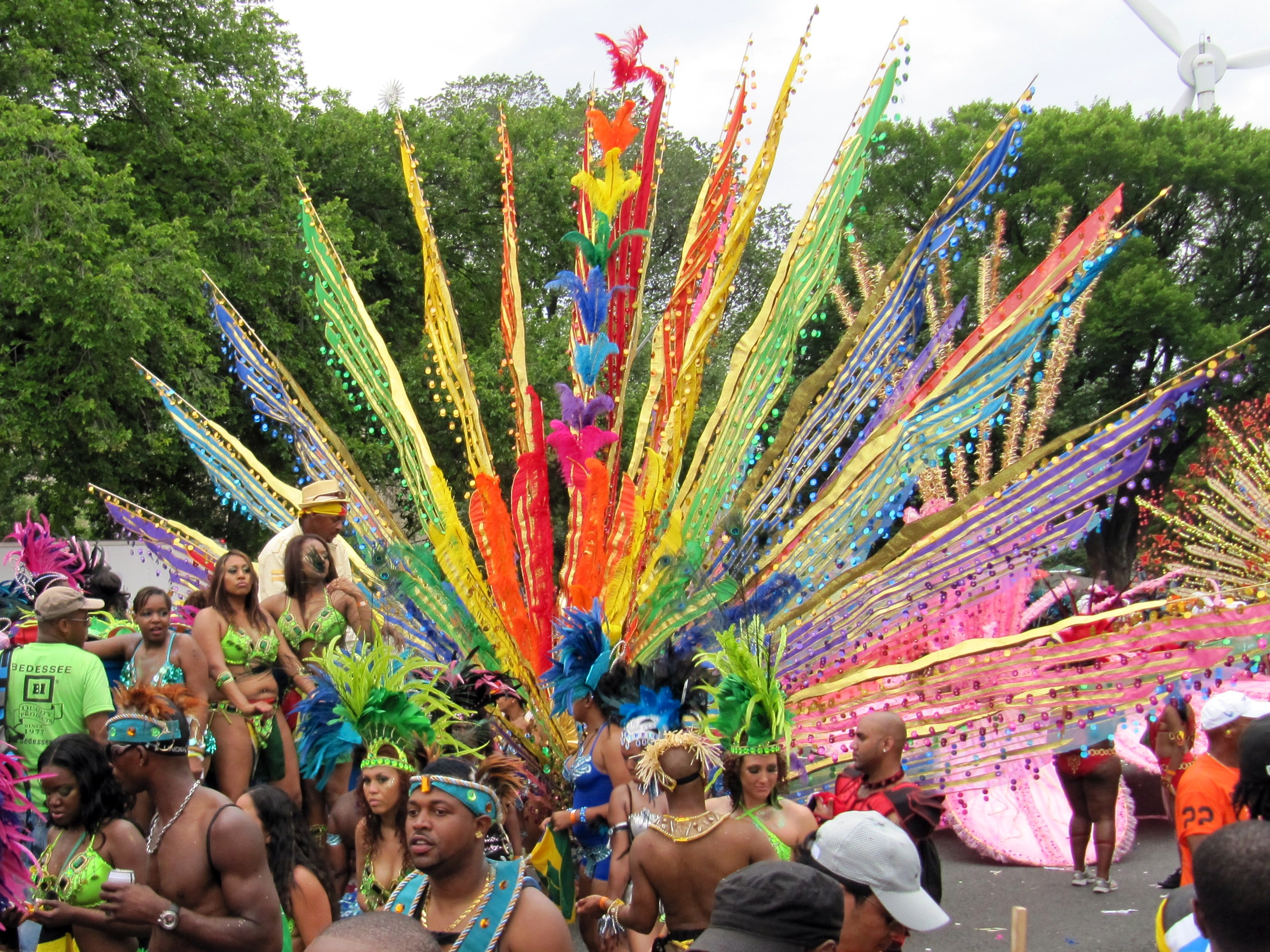
The grand parade for the Caribana festival on Lake Shore Boulevard

Toronto's Caribana (formerly known as Scotiabank Caribbean Carnival) takes place from mid-July to early August of every summer. Primarily based on the Trinidad and Tobago Carnival, the first Caribana took place in 1967 when the city's Caribbean community celebrated Canada's Centennial. More than forty years later, it has grown to attract one million people to Toronto's Lake Shore Boulevard annually. Tourism for the festival is in the hundreds of thousands, and each year, the event generates over $400 million in revenue for Ontario's economy.

One of the most significant events in the city, Pride Week, takes place in late June and is one of the largest LGBTQ+ festivals in the world.

== Sports ==
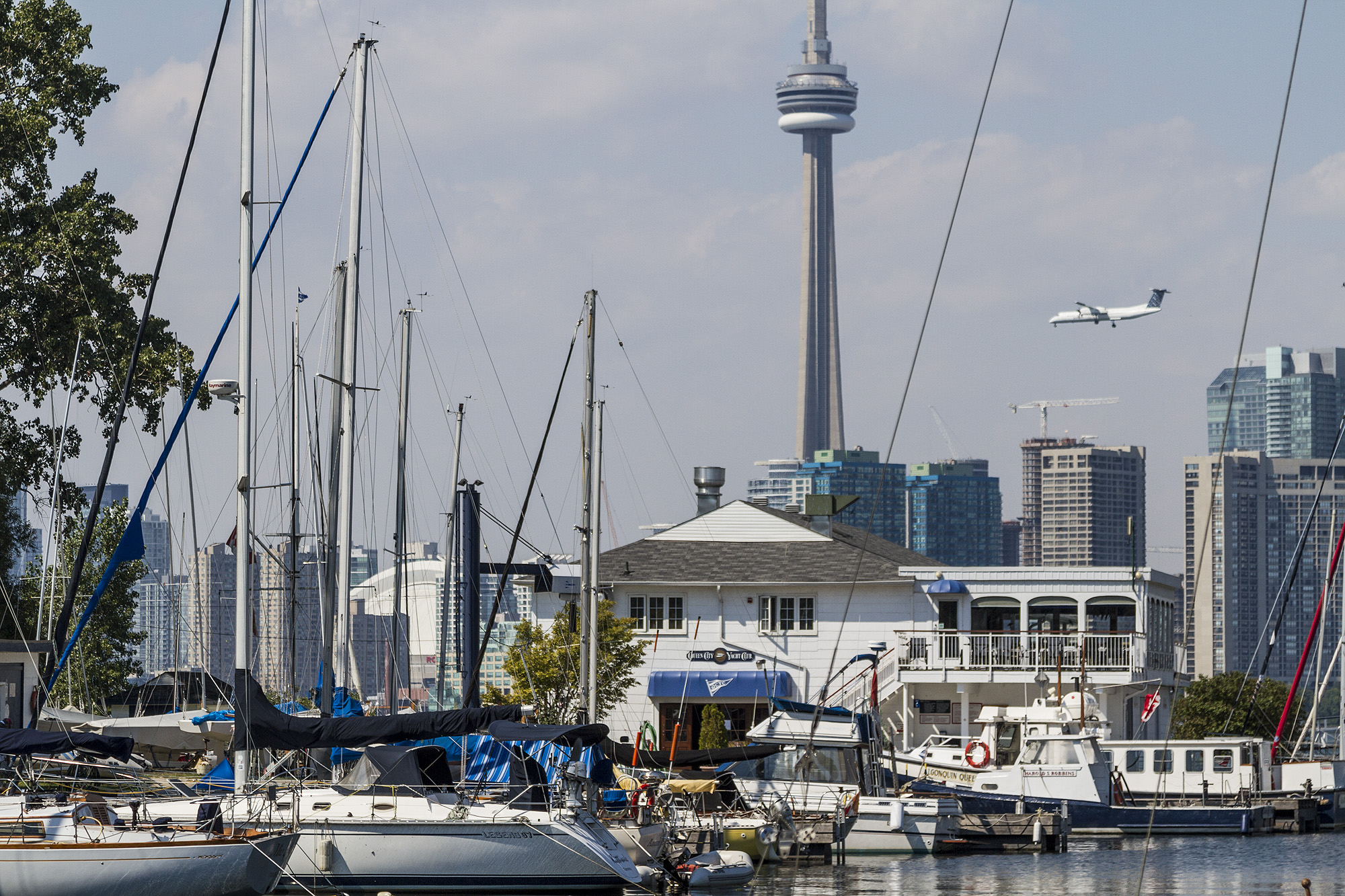
Queen City Yacht Club facilities and piers on the Toronto Islands

Toronto is represented in seven major league sports, with teams in the National Hockey League (NHL), Major League Baseball (MLB), National Basketball Association (NBA), Canadian Football League (CFL) and Major League Soccer (MLS), the Professional Women's Hockey League (PWHL), and the Women's National Basketball Association (WNBA). It was formerly represented in an eighth; the USL W-League that announced on November 6, 2015, that it would cease operation ahead of the 2016 season and the Canadian Women's Hockey League (CWHL) ceased operations in May 2019, though the PWHL is the successor to the CWHL. The city's major sports venues include the Scotiabank Arena (formerly Air Canada Centre), Rogers Centre (formerly SkyDome), Coca-Cola Coliseum (formerly Ricoh Coliseum), and BMO Field.

Historic sports clubs of Toronto include the Granite Club (established in 1836), the Royal Canadian Yacht Club (established in 1852), the Toronto Cricket Skating and Curling Club (established before 1827), the Argonaut Rowing Club (established in 1872), the Toronto Lawn Tennis Club (established in 1881), and the Badminton and Racquet Club (established in 1924).

=== Professional sports ===
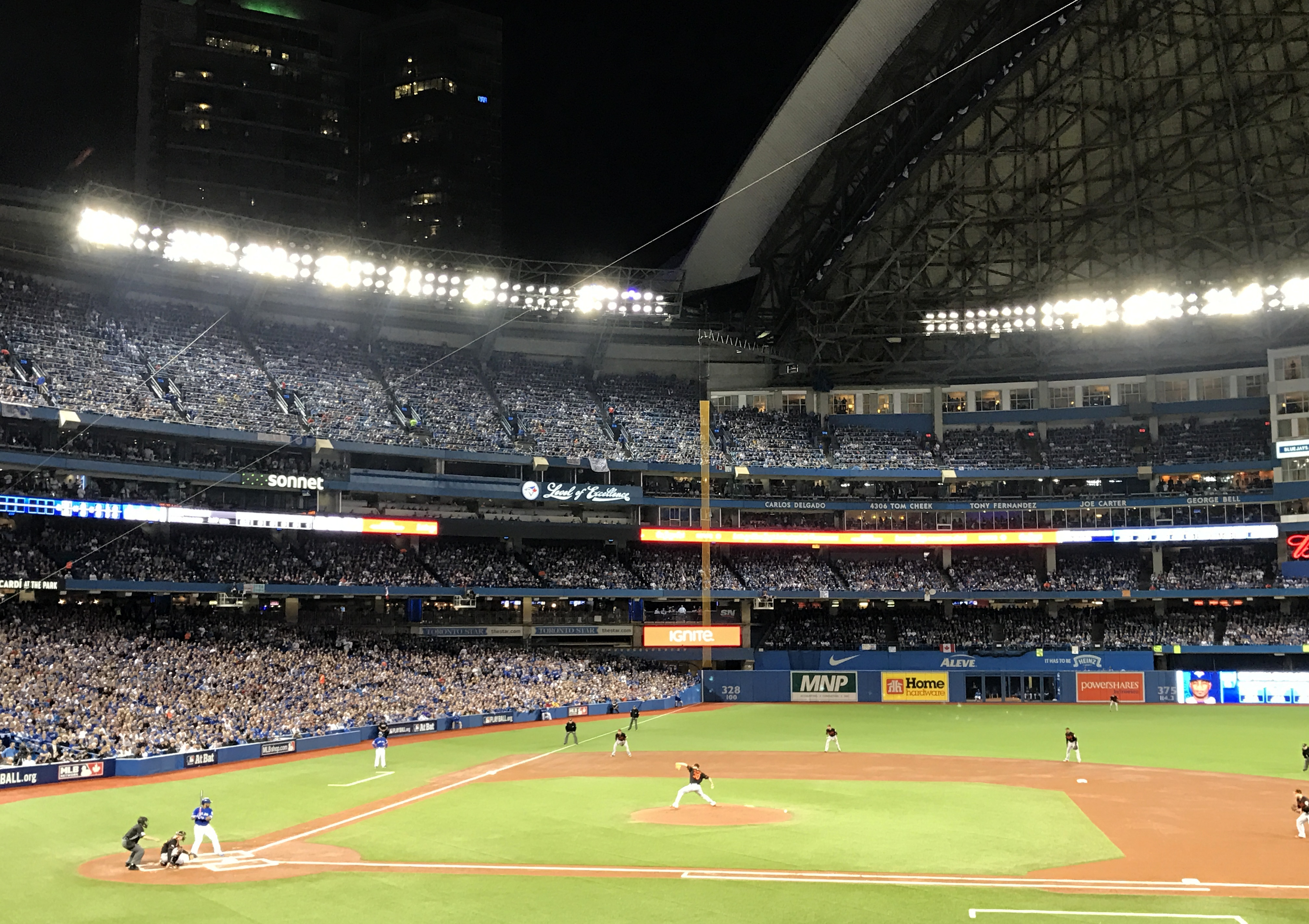
The 2016 American League Wild Card Game played at Rogers Centre. The Toronto Blue Jays use the stadium.

Toronto is home to the Toronto Maple Leafs, one of the NHL's Original Six clubs, and has also served as home to the Hockey Hall of Fame since 1958. The city had a rich history of hockey championships. Along with the Maple Leafs' 13 Stanley Cup titles, the Toronto Marlboros and St. Michael's College School-based Ontario Hockey League teams, combined, have won a record 12 Memorial Cup titles. The Toronto Marlies of the American Hockey League also play in Toronto at Coca-Cola Coliseum and are the farm team for the Maple Leafs. The Toronto Six, the first Canadian franchise in the National Women's Hockey League, began play with the 2020–21 season. However, the National Women's Hockey League folded. Its successor, the Professional Women's Hockey League, has the Toronto Sceptres.

The city is home to the Toronto Blue Jays MLB baseball team. The team has won two World Series titles (1992, 1993), though they lost the 2025 World Series in seven games. The Blue Jays play their home games at the Rogers Centre in the downtown core. Toronto has a long history of minor-league professional baseball dating back to the 1800s, culminating in the Toronto Maple Leafs baseball team, whose owner first proposed an MLB team for Toronto.

The Toronto Raptors basketball team entered the NBA in 1995 and has since earned eleven playoff spots and five Atlantic Division titles in 24 seasons. They won their first NBA title in 2019, subsequently celebrating with the championship parade. The Raptors are the only NBA team with their own television channel, NBA TV Canada. They play their home games at Scotiabank Arena, which is shared with the Maple Leafs. In 2016, Toronto hosted the 65th NBA All-Star game, the first to be held outside the United States. The Toronto Tempo of the Women's National Basketball Association (WNBA) will begin play in 2026.

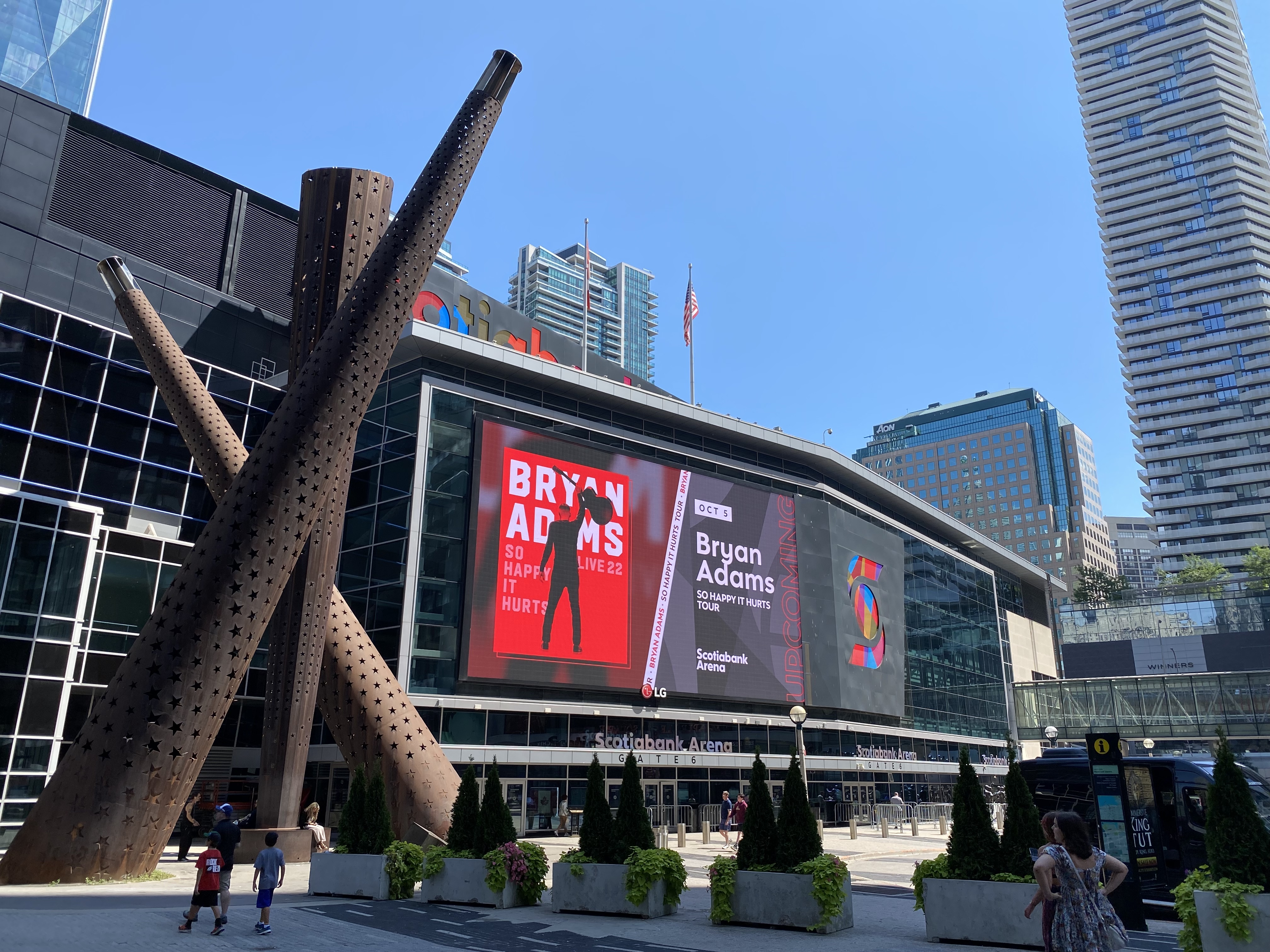
Scotiabank Arena from Bremner Boulevard. The NBA's Toronto Raptors and the NHL's Toronto Maple Leafs play their home games at the arena.

The city is represented in Canadian football by the CFL's Toronto Argonauts, which was founded in 1873. The club has won 19 Grey Cup Canadian championship titles, with the most recent victory in 2024. The club's home games are played at BMO Field.

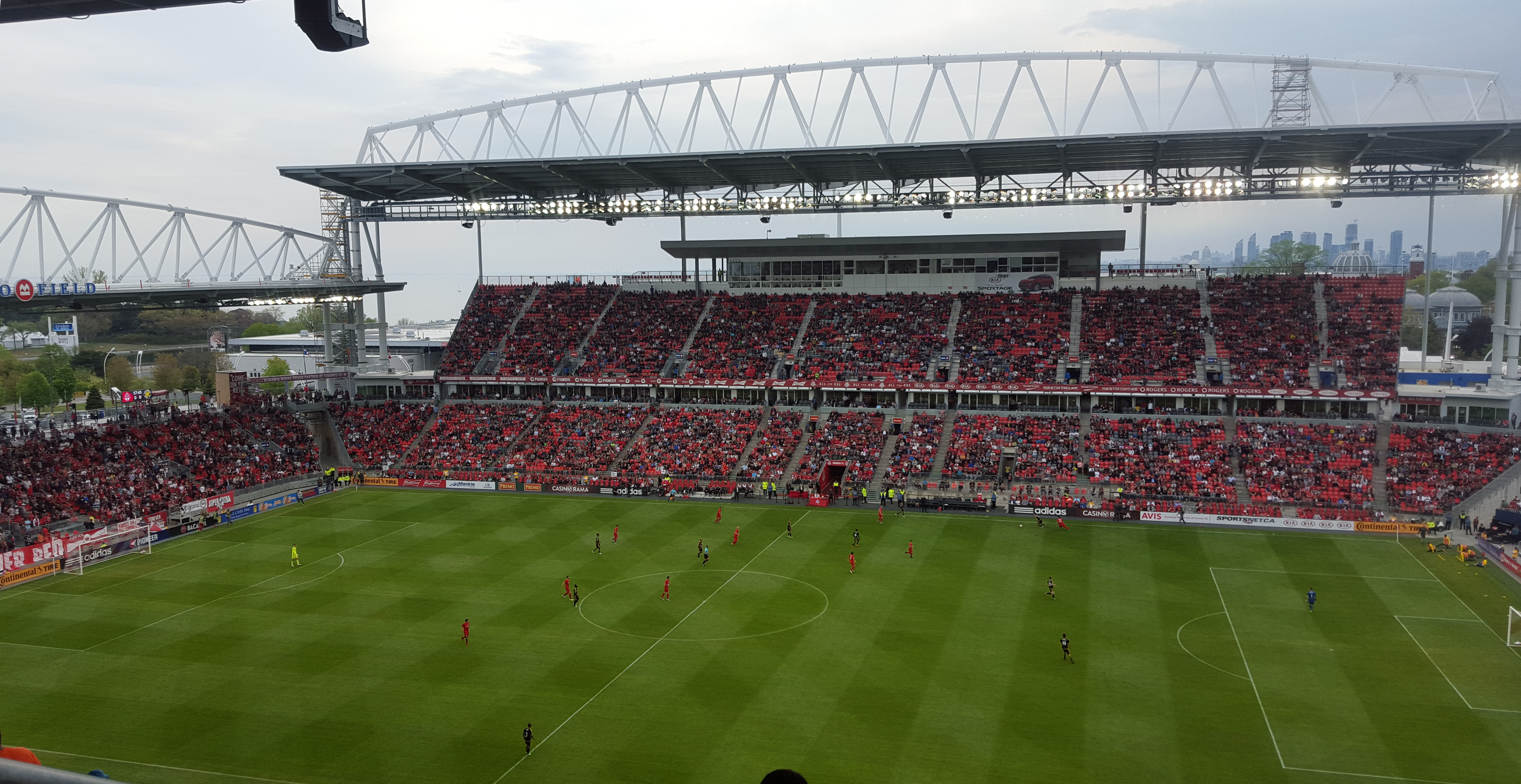
View of BMO Field from the grandstands. The CFL's Toronto Argonauts and MLS' Toronto FC play their home games at the outdoor stadium.

Toronto is represented in soccer by the Toronto FC MLS team, who have won seven Canadian Championship titles, as well as the MLS Cup in 2017 and the Supporters' Shield for best regular season record, also in 2017. They share BMO Field with the Toronto Argonauts. Toronto has a high level of participation in soccer across the city at several smaller stadiums and fields. Toronto FC entered the league as an expansion team in 2007. AFC Toronto of the Northern Super League play at York Lions Stadium.

The Toronto Rock is the city's nominal National Lacrosse League team. They won five National Lacrosse League Cup titles in seven years in the late 1990s and the first decade of the 21st century, appearing in an NLL-record five straight championship games from 1999 to 2003, and are first all-time in the number of Champion's Cups won. The Rock formerly shared the Scotiabank Arena with the Maple Leafs and the Raptors. However, the Toronto Rock moved to the nearby city of Hamilton while retaining its Toronto name.

The Toronto Wolfpack became Canada's first professional rugby league team and the world's first transatlantic professional sports team when they began play in the Rugby Football League's League One competition in 2017. Due to COVID-19 restrictions on international travel the team withdrew from the Super League in 2020 with its future uncertain. The rugby club's ownership changed in 2021, now 'Team Wolfpack', plays in the newly formed North American Rugby League tournament.

Toronto is home to the Toronto Rush, a semi-professional ultimate team that competes in the American Ultimate Disc League (AUDL). Ultimate (disc), in Canada, has its beginning roots in Toronto, with 3300 players competing annually in the Toronto Ultimate Club (League).

Toronto has hosted several National Football League (NFL) exhibition games at the Rogers Centre. Ted Rogers leased the Buffalo Bills from Ralph Wilson for the purposes of having the Bills play eight home games in the city between 2008 and 2013. There have been many serious proposals for NFL expansion to Toronto.

=== Collegiate sports ===
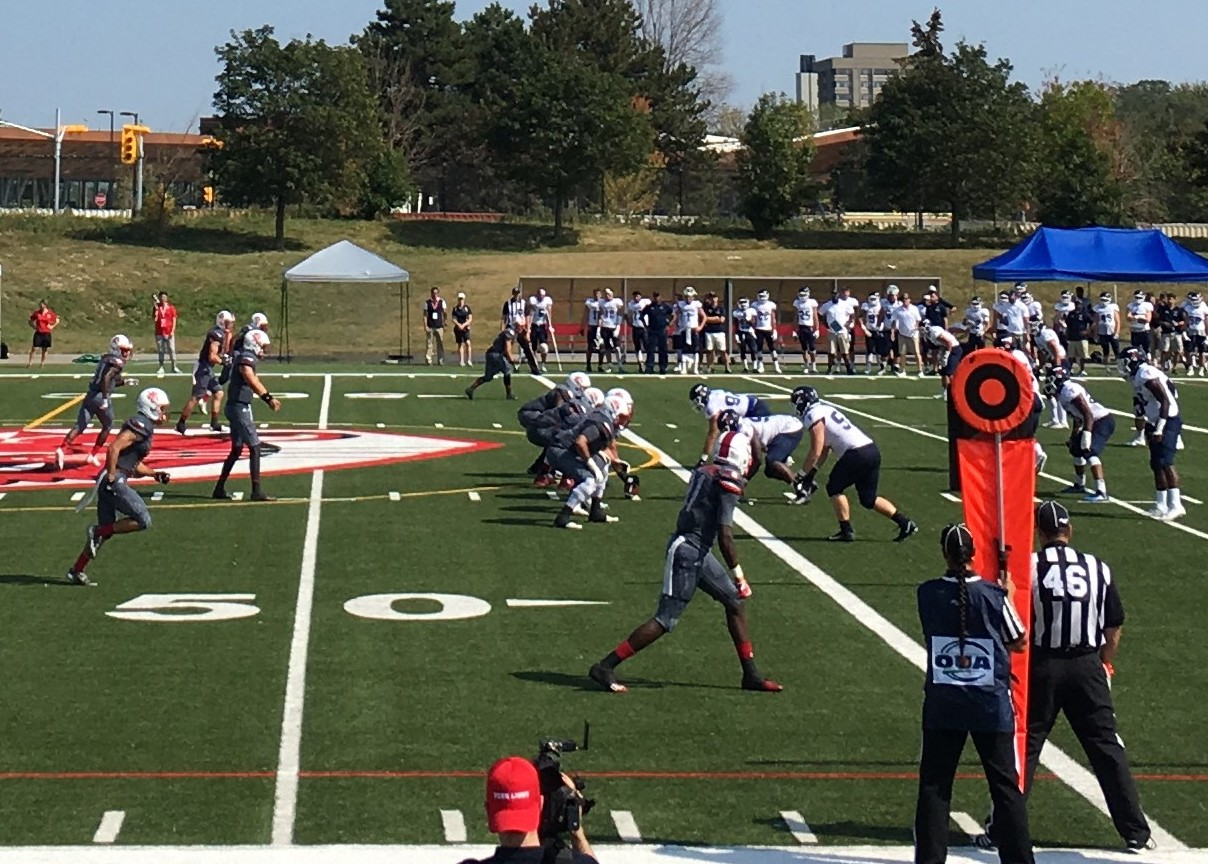
A Canadian football game between the Toronto Varsity Blues and the York Lions at York's Alumni Field

The University of Toronto's St. George campus in downtown Toronto was where the first recorded college football game was held in November 1861. Many post-secondary institutions in Toronto are members of U Sports or the Canadian Collegiate Athletic Association, the former for universities and the latter for colleges.

Toronto was home to the International Bowl, an NCAA-sanctioned post-season college football game that pitted a Mid-American Conference team against a Big East Conference team. From 2007 to 2010, the game was played at Rogers Centre annually in January.

=== Events ===
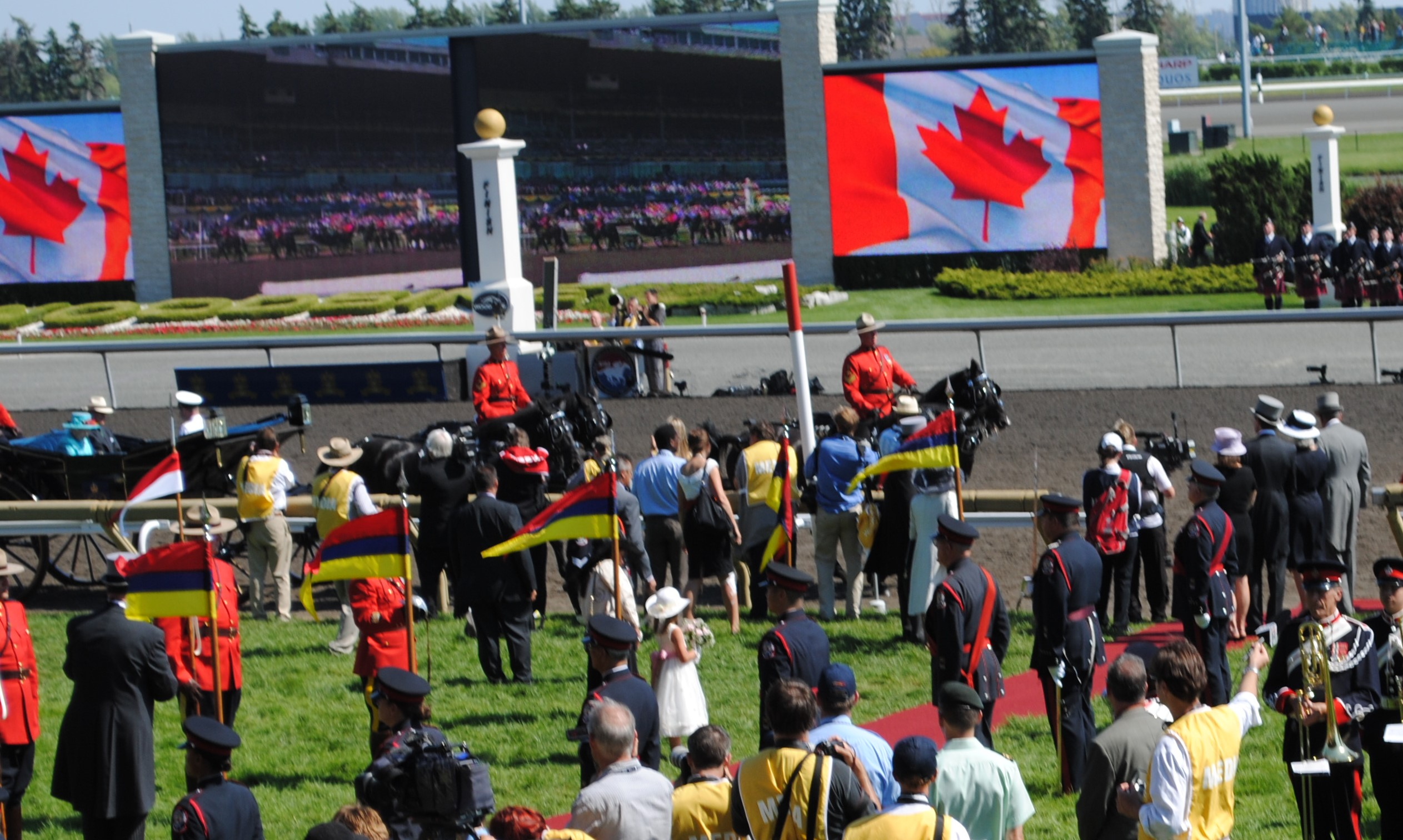
Arrival of Elizabeth II at the 2010 Queen's Plate (later renamed King's Plate upon the accession of her son Charles III) at Woodbine Racetrack

Toronto, along with Montreal, hosts an annual tennis tournament called the Canadian Open (not to be confused with the identically named golf tournament) between the months of July and August. In odd-numbered years, the men's tournament is held in Montreal, while the women's tournament is held in Toronto, and vice versa in even-numbered years.

The city hosts the Toronto Waterfront Marathon annually, one of the World Athletics Label Road Races. From 1986 to 2025, Toronto used to host the Grand Prix of Toronto, part of the IndyCar Series schedule, held on a street circuit at Exhibition Place until it was moved to Markham. It was previously sanctioned by Championship Auto Racing Teams (CART) as the Molson Indy Toronto until 2007. Both thoroughbred and standardbred horse racing events are conducted at Woodbine Racetrack in Rexdale, most notably the King's Plate (which was named the Queen's Plate during the reign of Elizabeth II).

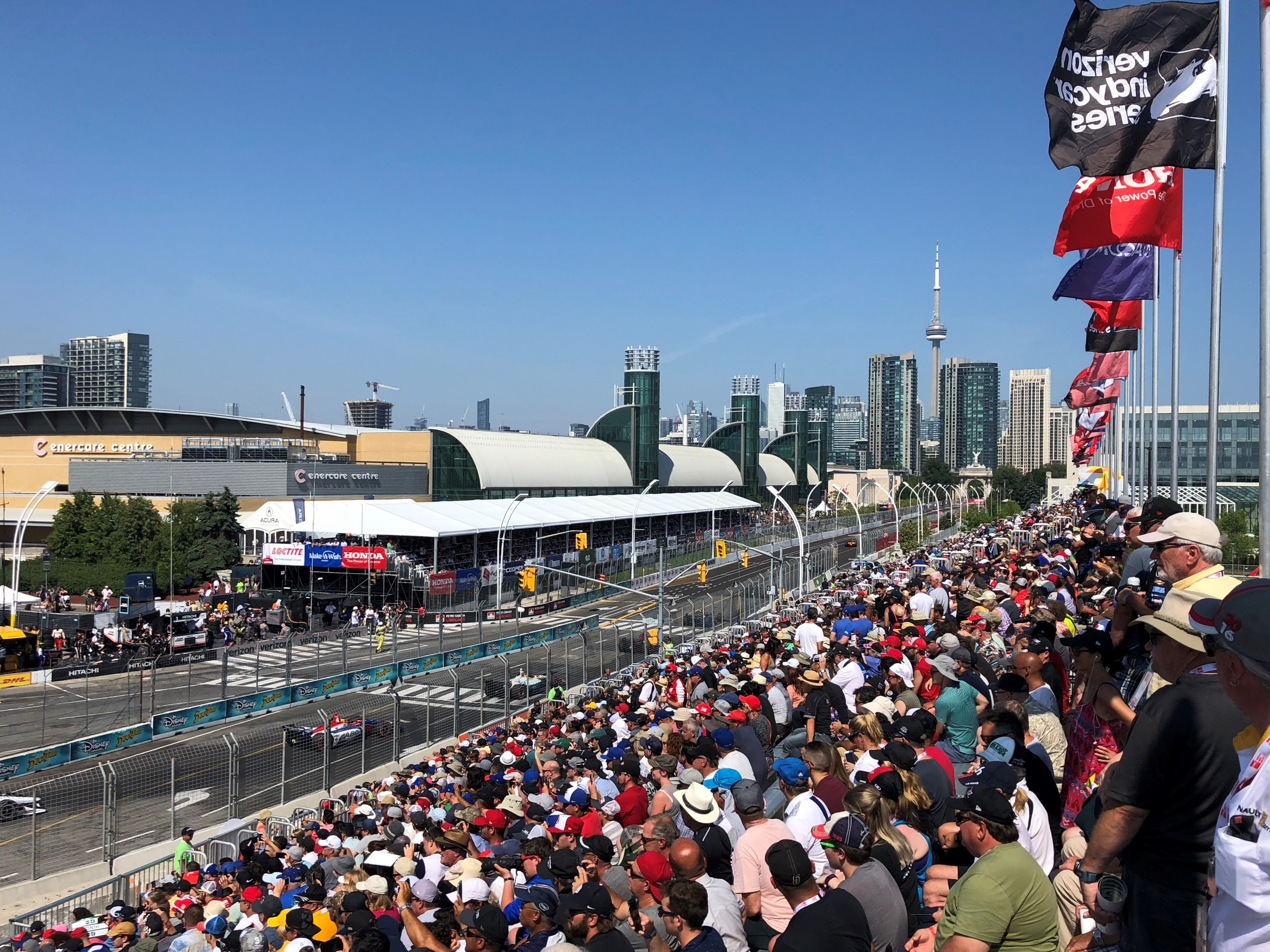
The 2018 Grand Prix of Toronto, an IndyCar Series race formerly held at Exhibition Place

Toronto hosted the 2015 Pan American Games in July 2015 and the 2015 Parapan American Games in August 2015. It beat the cities of Lima, Peru, and Bogotá, Colombia, to win the rights to stage the games. The games were the largest multi-sport event ever to be held in Canada (in terms of athletes competing), double the size of the 2010 Winter Olympics in Vancouver, British Columbia.

Toronto was a candidate city for the 1996 and 2008 Summer Olympics, which were awarded to Atlanta and Beijing, respectively. The city previously hosted the Summer Paralympics in 1976.

Toronto was one of 16 cities in North America (and one of two Canadian cities) to host matches during the 2026 FIFA World Cup.

== Government and politics ==
=== Government ===
Toronto is a single-tier municipality governed by a mayor–council system. The structure of the municipal government is outlined the City of Toronto Act. The mayor of Toronto is elected by direct popular vote to serve as the chief executive of the city. The Toronto City Council is a unicameral legislative body, comprising 25 councillors, since the 2018 municipal election, representing geographical wards throughout the city. The mayor and members of the city council serve four-year terms without term limits. (Until the 2006 municipal election, the mayor and city councillors served three-year terms.)

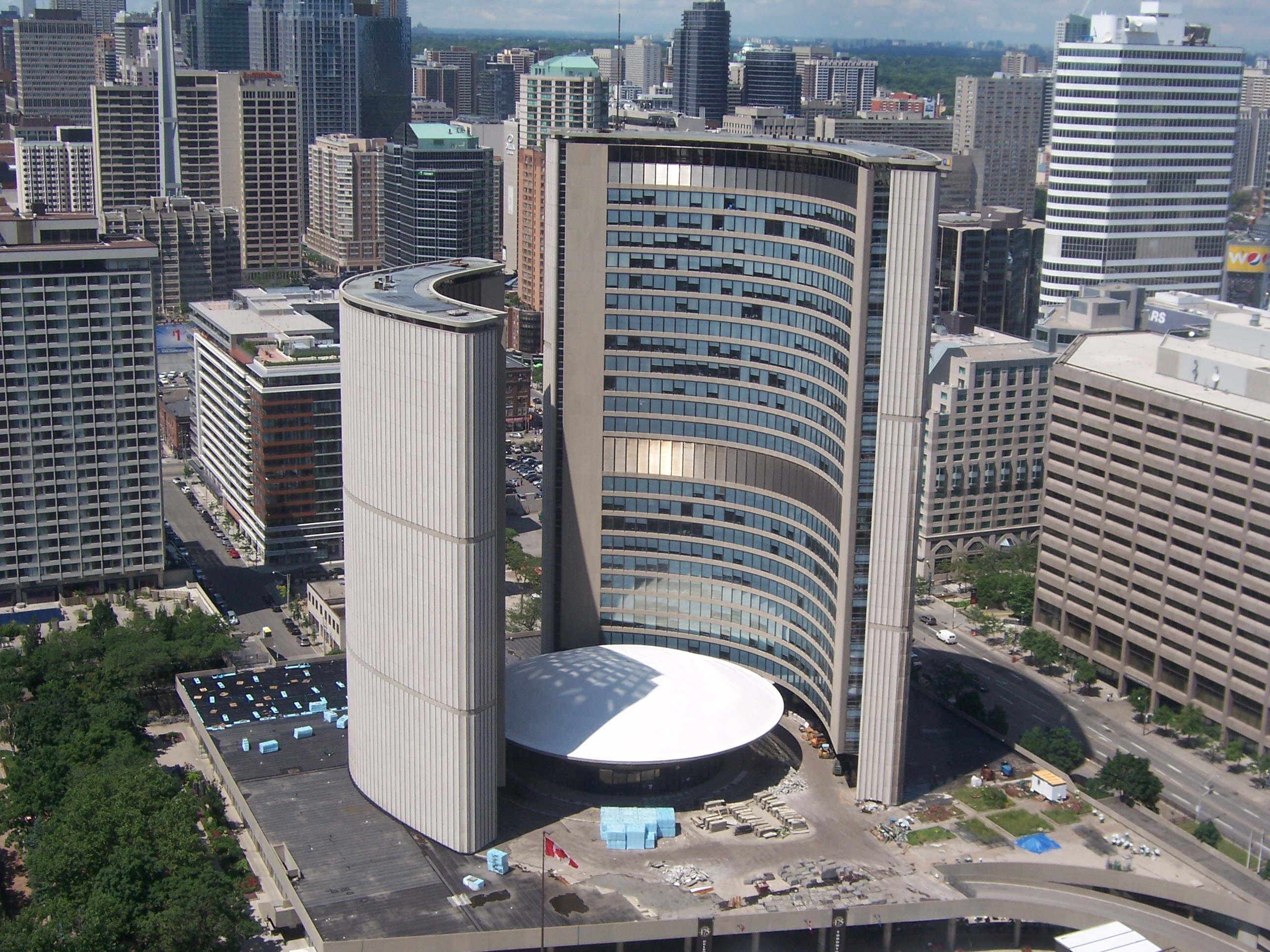
Toronto City Hall is the seat of the municipal government of Toronto

At the beginning of each term, mayor forms a striking committee which recommends the composition of other committees. The mayor appoints deputy mayors, committee chairs and vice chairs, and remaining committee members are appointed by council on the recommendation of the striking committee. An executive committee is formed by the chairs of each standing committee, the mayor, the deputy mayor and four other councillors. There are four standing committees, three special committees as well as other bodies which govern agencies such as the Board of Health, the Toronto Transit Commission Board and the Toronto Police Service Board.

Administratively, the city is divided into four districts: North (North York), South (Toronto and East York), West (Etobicoke and York) and East (Scarborough) City council has four community councils which have delegated decision-making authority on local, routine matters, and make recommendations to the city council on issues such as planning and zoning within their respective districts. Each city councillor is a member of the community council their ward is in.

There are about 40 subcommittees and advisory committees appointed by the city council. These bodies are made up of city councillors and private citizen volunteers. Examples include the Pedestrian Committee, Waste Diversion Task Force 2010, and the Task Force to Bring Back the Don.

The City of Toronto had an approved operating budget of CA$13.53 billion in 2020 and a ten-year capital budget and plan of CA$43.5 billion. The city's revenues include subsidies from the Government of Canada and the Government of Ontario (for programs mandated by those governments), 33 per cent from property tax, 6 per cent from the land transfer tax and the rest from other tax revenues and user fees. The city's largest operating expenditures are the Toronto Transit Commission at CA$2.14 billion, and the Toronto Police Service, CA$1.22 billion.

=== Crime ===
The historically low crime rate in Toronto has resulted in the city having a reputation as one of the safest major cities in North America. For instance, in 2007, the homicide rate for Toronto was 3.43 per 100,000 people, compared with Atlanta (19.7), Boston (10.3), Los Angeles (10.0), New York City (6.3), Vancouver (3.1), and Montreal (2.6). Toronto's robbery rate also ranks low, with 207.1 robberies per 100,000 people, compared with Los Angeles (348.5), Vancouver (266.2), New York City (265.9), and Montreal (235.3). Toronto has a comparable rate of car theft to various U.S. cities, although it is not among the highest in Canada.

In 2005, Toronto media coined the term "Year of the Gun" because of a record number of gun-related homicides, 52 out of 80 homicides in total. The total number of homicides dropped to 70 in 2006; that year, nearly 2,000 people in Toronto were victims of a violent gun-related crime, about one-quarter of the national total. 86 homicides were committed in 2007, roughly half of which involved guns. Gang-related incidents have also been on the rise; between 1997 and 2005, over 300 gang-related homicides have occurred. As a result, the Ontario government developed an anti-gun strategy. In 2011, Toronto's murder rate plummeted to 51 murders—nearly a 26% drop from the previous year. The 51 homicides were the lowest number the city has recorded since 1999 when there were 47. While subsequent years did see a return to higher rates, it remained nearly flat line of 57–59 homicides in from 2012 to 2015. 2016 went to 75 for the first time in over eight years. 2017 had a drop off of 10 murders to close the year at 65, with a homicide rate of 2.4 per 100,000 population.

The total number of homicides in Toronto reached a record 98 in 2018; the number included 14 fatalities from the Toronto van attack and the Danforth shooting, which gave the city a homicide rate of around 3.6 per 100,000 people. The record year for murders was previously 1991, with 89, at a rate of 3.9 murders per 100,000 people. The 2018 homicide rate was higher than in Winnipeg, Calgary, Edmonton, Vancouver, Ottawa, Montreal, Hamilton, New York City, San Diego, and Austin. Homicides in 2019 dropped to 80 (a rate of 2.9 per 100,000 people) below the rate of most US cities, but still higher than the Canadian average of 1.8. Shooting incidents also increased to an all-time high of 492 in 2019, even outpacing gun incidents that occurred in 2018. 2020 saw another decrease in homicides with the city having a total of 71 murders for the year (a rate of around 2.6 per 100,000 people). However, in 2021, the city saw an increase in homicides, with the city murders increasing to 85, giving Toronto a homicide rate of 3.04 per 100,000 people. A decrease in murders happened the following year with 71 being reported in 2022 (a murder rate of 2.5 per 100,000), which was then followed by a slight increase in homicides with 73 being reported in 2023, giving the city a murder rate of 2.6 per 100,000 people, along with a record 12,143 reports of auto theft in the year. 2024 saw another increase in homicides with 85 being reported in the year, giving the city a homicide rate of around 3.04 per 100,000 people.

== Transportation ==
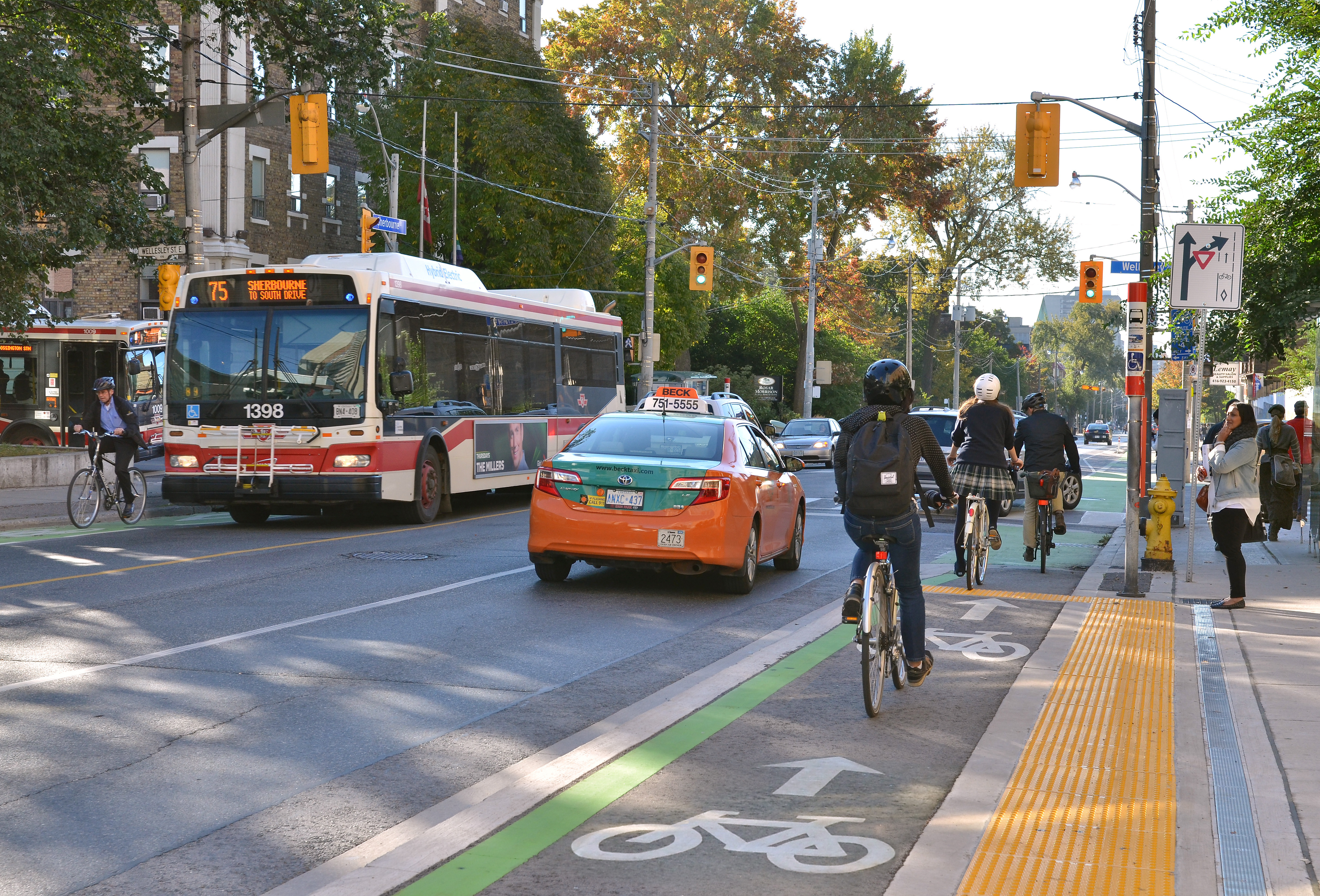
A roadway with bike lanes. Orion VII bus operated by the Toronto Transit Commission is visible in the background.

Toronto is a central transportation hub for road, rail, and air networks in Southern Ontario. The city has many forms of transport, including highways and public transit. The Toronto Transit Commission (TTC) is the main operator of public transportation in the city. Toronto also has an extensive network of bicycle lanes and multi-use trails and paths.

=== Rail ===
Toronto has various forms of rail transport, including streetcars, light rail, heavy rail, regional rail, and inter-city passenger and freight rail. The backbone of its public transport network is the Toronto subway, a rapid transit system operating both underground and on the surface, and is operated by the TTC. The Toronto subway consists of three heavy rail rapid transit lines spanning the city, the U-shaped Line 1, east–west Line 2 and the short east–west Line 4, and two light rail lines, Line 5 and Line 6, both running east–west.

The Union Station Rail Corridor at Union Station. The corridor is used by commuter and intercity rail services.

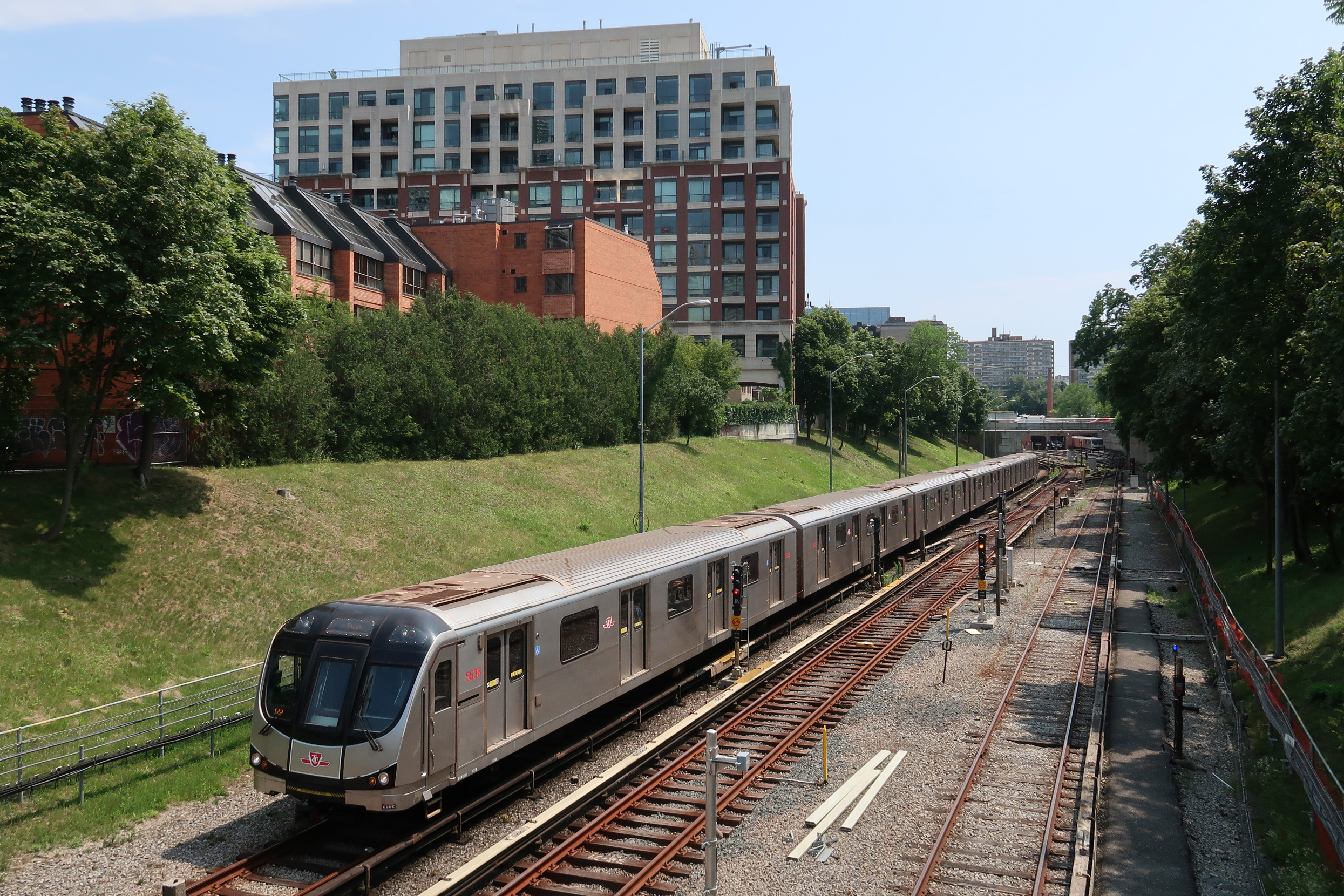
A Toronto Rocket train at Davisville Station

The TTC also operates a network of streetcars primarily serving streets in downtown that do not have subway service.

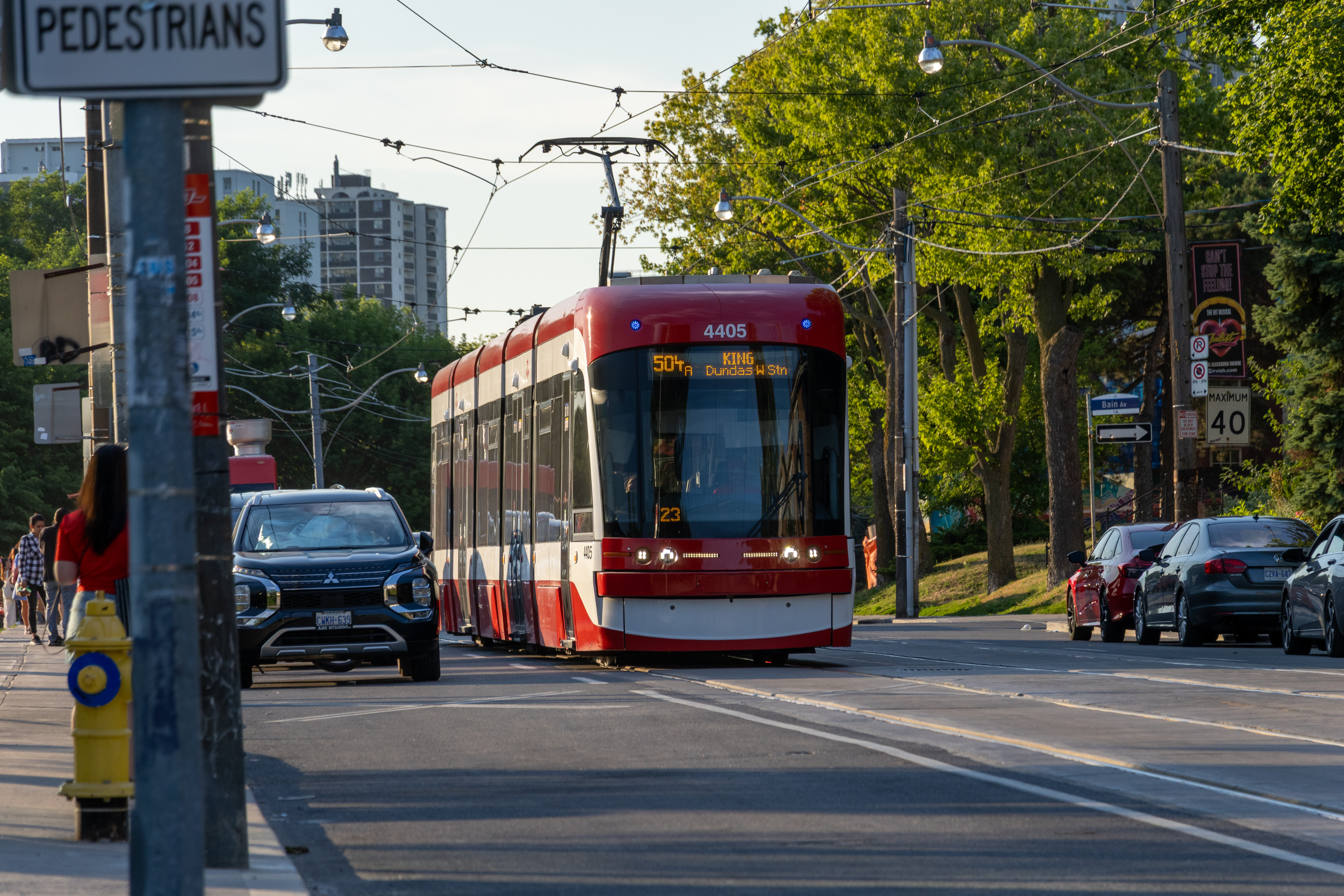
A Flexity Outlook streetcar on Broadview Avenue. The streetcar system is the largest and busiest such system in North America.

Union Station, located in downtown, is the city's main railway station and hub for regional and inter-city rail, and is serviced by the subway and streetcars with an adjacent station of the same name. GO Transit, owned by the provincial government, operates a regional rail network centred on Union Station that connects downtown Toronto with the Greater Golden Horseshoe region. GO Transit carries over 320,000 passengers every weekday (2025) and 79 million annually, with a majority of them travelling to or from Union Station. Metrolinx is currently implementing Regional Express Rail into its GO Transit network and plans to electrify many of its rail lines by 2030. Via Rail, Canada's federally owned inter-city rail network, connects Toronto with other cities in the heart of Central Canada with the Quebec City–Windsor Corridor, and with Northern Ontario and Western Canada with The Canadian, a trans-continental rail service. The Maple Leaf, jointly operated by Via Rail and Amtrak, runs between Toronto and New York City, and is the only international rail service to Toronto.

There have been numerous plans to extend the subway and implement light rail lines, but budgetary concerns have thwarted many efforts. By November 2011, construction on Line 5 Eglinton, an east–west light rail line, began. Line 5 originally scheduled to finish construction by 2020, but was delayed several times to 2026. The Line 6 Finch West light rail line opened in 2025. In 2019, the Government of Ontario released a transit plan for the Greater Toronto Area, which includes a new 16-kilometre (9.9 mi) Ontario Line, Line 1 extension to Richmond Hill Centre, a Line 2 extension to Sheppard Avenue / McCowan Road to replace Line 3, and an extension for Line 5 Eglinton to Toronto Pearson International Airport.

Toronto's century-old Union Station is also getting a major renovation and upgrade which would be able to accommodate more rail traffic from GO Transit, Via Rail, UP Express and Amtrak. Construction on a new Union Station Bus Terminal began in 2017 and was completed in 2020. In addition, the East Harbour Transit Hub is slated to open in 2028. Toronto's public transit network also connects to other municipal networks such as York Region Transit, Viva, Durham Region Transit, Brampton Transit, and MiWay.

=== Bus ===
The TTC operates an extensive bus network that serves parts of the city many not served by the sparse subway network. The TTC bus system had an annual ridership of over 389 million trips in 2025.

GO Transit provides intercity bus services from the Union Station Bus Terminal and other bus terminals in the city to destinations within the Golden Horseshoe. Long-distance intercity coach services by multiple companies also operated from the Union Station Bus Terminal and provide a network of services to further cities in Ontario, neighbouring provinces, and the United States. The Toronto Coach Terminal formerly served as the city's intercity coach hub from 1931 to 2021, when the terminal was decommissioned.

=== Sea ===
The Port of Toronto in the Toronto Harbour receives 2 million tons of cargo annually as of 2024.

The Toronto Island ferries travel from ferry terminals in the downtown mainland to the Toronto Islands. Ferries operated by the city carried over 1.4 million passengers in 2024.

=== Air ===
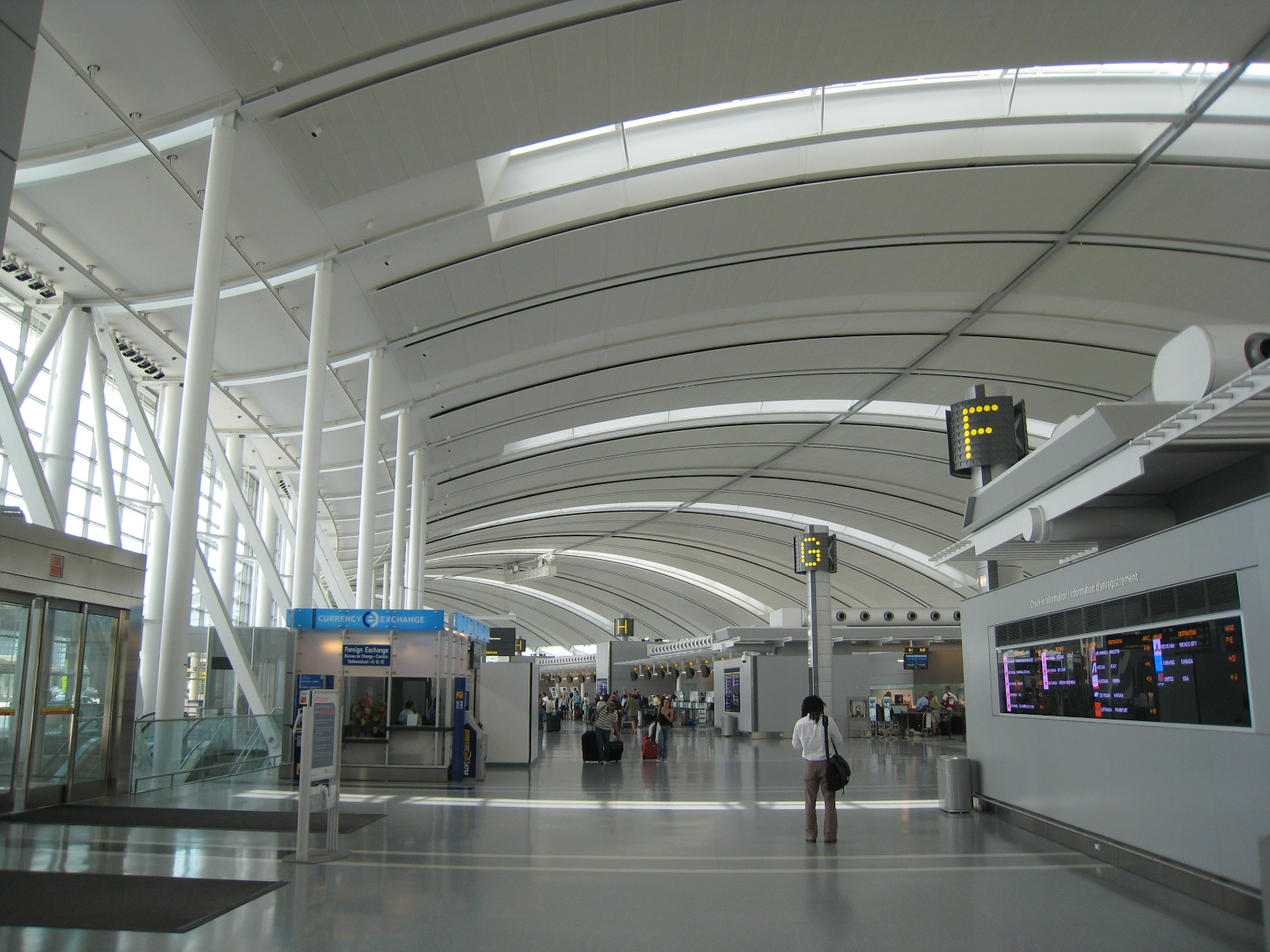
Interior of Toronto Pearson International Airport's Terminal 1. Toronto Pearson serves as the international airport for the Greater Toronto Area

Canada's busiest airport, Toronto Pearson International Airport (IATA: YYZ), straddles the city's western boundary with the suburban city of Mississauga. The Union Pearson Express (UP Express) train service provides a direct link between Pearson International and Union Station. It began carrying passengers in June 2015.

Limited commercial and passenger service to nearby destinations in Canada and the United States is offered from the Billy Bishop Toronto City Airport (IATA: YTZ) on the Toronto Islands, southwest of downtown. Downsview Airport (IATA: YZD), was located near the city's north end, and was owned by de Havilland Canada serving as the Bombardier Aviation aircraft factory. The airport permanently ceased operations in April 2024.

Within a few hours' drive, Hamilton's John C. Munro International Airport (IATA: YHM) and Buffalo's Buffalo Niagara International Airport (IATA: BUF) serve as alternate airports for the Toronto area in addition to serving their respective cities. A secondary international airport, to be located northeast of Toronto in Pickering, had been planned by the Government of Canada, but was permanently cancelled due to the Alto high-speed rail project, which would make the airport no longer necessary.

The city is also serviced by a number of private heliports, most of which are attached to local hospitals and exclusively used for medevac flights. Additionally, Polson Pier Heliport opened in 2025.

=== Roads and highways ===
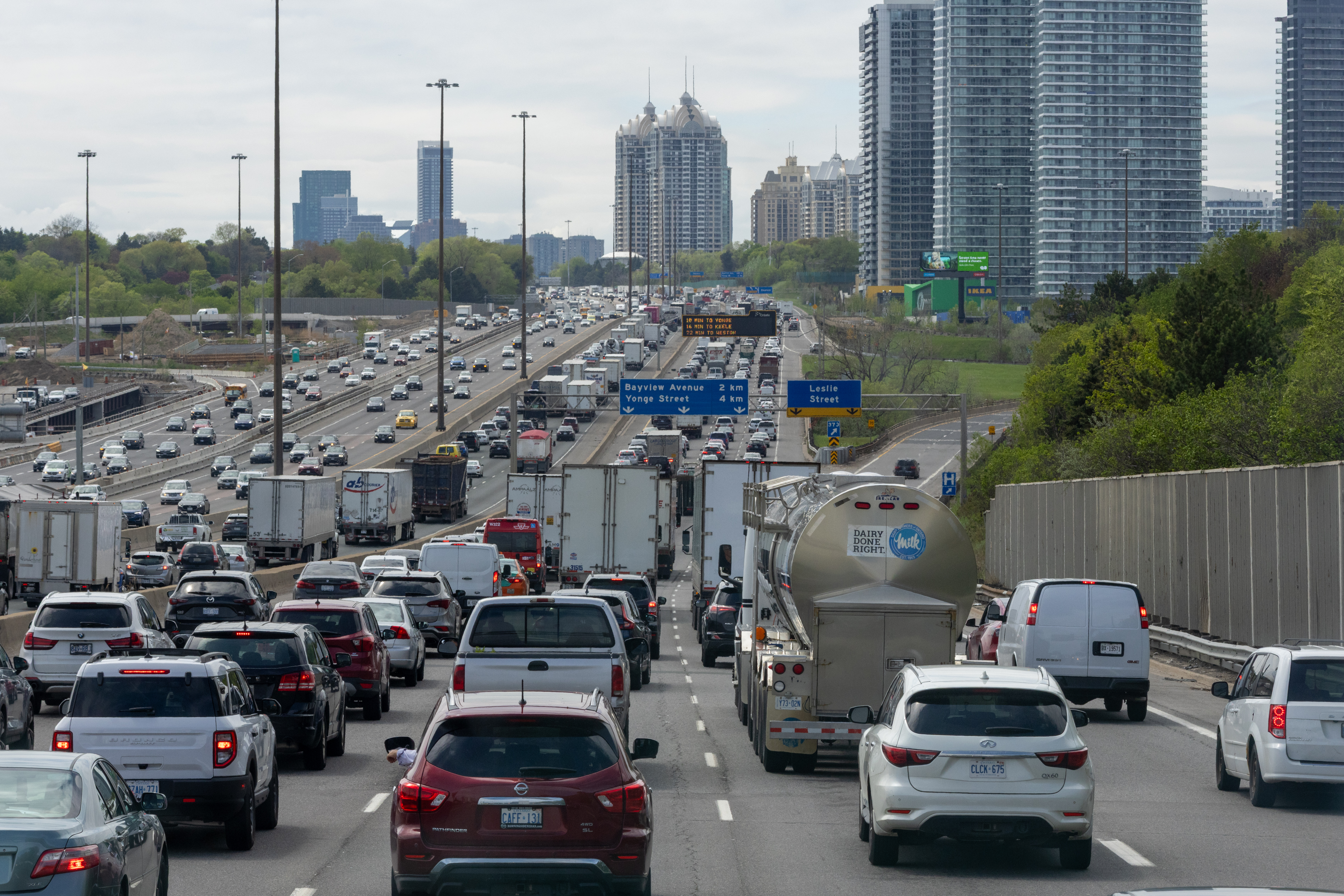
Highway 401 is a 400-series highway that passes west to east through Greater Toronto. Toronto's portion of Highway 401 is the busiest highway in North America.

The grid of major city roads was laid out by a concession road system, in which major arterial roads are 100 chains (6,600 ft; 2.0 km) apart (with some exceptions, particularly in Scarborough and Etobicoke, as they used a different survey). Major east-west arterial roads are generally parallel with the Lake Ontario shoreline, and major north–south arterial roads are roughly perpendicular to the shoreline, though slightly angled north of Eglinton Avenue. This arrangement is sometimes broken by geographical accidents, most notably the Don River ravines. Toronto's grid north is approximately 17° to the west of true north. Many arterials, particularly north–south ones, due to the city originally being within the former York County, continue beyond the city into the 905 suburbs and further into the rural countryside.

There are several municipal expressways and provincial highways that serve Toronto and the Greater Toronto Area. In particular, Highway 401 bisects the city from west to east, bypassing the downtown core. It is the busiest road in North America, and one of the busiest highways in the world. Other provincial highways include Highway 400, which connects the city with Northern Ontario and beyond and Highway 404, an extension of the Don Valley Parkway into the northern suburbs. The Queen Elizabeth Way (QEW), North America's first divided intercity highway, terminates at Toronto's western boundary and links Toronto to Niagara Falls and Buffalo. The main municipal expressways in Toronto include the Gardiner Expressway, the Don Valley Parkway, and, to some extent, Allen Road. Toronto's traffic congestion is one of the highest in North America, and is the second-highest in Canada after Vancouver.

== Sister cities ==
=== Partnership cities ===
- Chicago, Illinois, United States (1991)
- Chongqing, China (1986)
- Frankfurt, Germany (1989)
- Milan, Italy (2003)
- Ho Chi Minh City, Vietnam (2006)
- Kyiv, Ukraine (1992)
- Quito, Ecuador (2006)
- Rio de Janeiro, Brazil (2015)
- Sagamihara, Japan (1991)
- Warsaw, Poland (1990)

=== International project agreement ===
- Lisbon, Portugal
- Matera, Italy

== See also ==
- Great Lakes megalopolis – Cities around the Great Lakes of North America
- Largest cities in the Americas
- List of metropolitan areas in the Americas
- Outline of Toronto – Overview of and topical guide to Toronto
