= Outline of Toronto =

Overview of and topical guide to Toronto

The following outline is provided as an overview of and topical guide to Toronto:

Toronto is the largest city in Canada and the provincial capital of Ontario. It is located in Southern Ontario on the northwestern shore of Lake Ontario. Toronto is a relatively modern city. Its history begins in the late 18th century, when the British Crown purchased its land from the Mississaugas of the New Credit.

== General reference ==
- Pronunciation:
  - Pronunciation abroad: /təˈrɒntoʊ/
  - Local pronunciation: [ˈtɹɒnoʊ]
- Name of Toronto

== Geography of Toronto ==
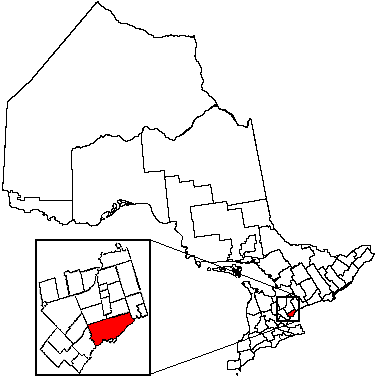
Location of Toronto within Ontario

Location of Ontario

Geography of Toronto

- Toronto is: a city in Canada, and provincial capital of Ontario

=== Location of Toronto ===
Toronto is situated in the following regions: Northern Hemisphere, Western Hemisphere

- Americas
- North America
  - Northern America
  - Laurentia
      - Canada
        - Central Canada
        - Eastern Canada
        - Canadian Shield
          - Ontario
            - Southern Ontario
              - Golden Horseshoe
              - Greater Toronto and Hamilton Area
              - Greater Toronto Area

Time zone: Eastern Standard Time (UTC-05), Eastern Daylight Time (UTC-04)

=== Geographic features of Toronto ===
==== Environment of Toronto ====
- Fauna of Toronto
- Flora of Toronto
  - Native trees in Toronto

==== Landforms of Toronto ====
- Toronto Harbour
- Toronto Islands
- Toronto ravine system
- Toronto waterway system
- Scarborough Bluffs
- Leslie Street Spit

==== Areas of Toronto ====
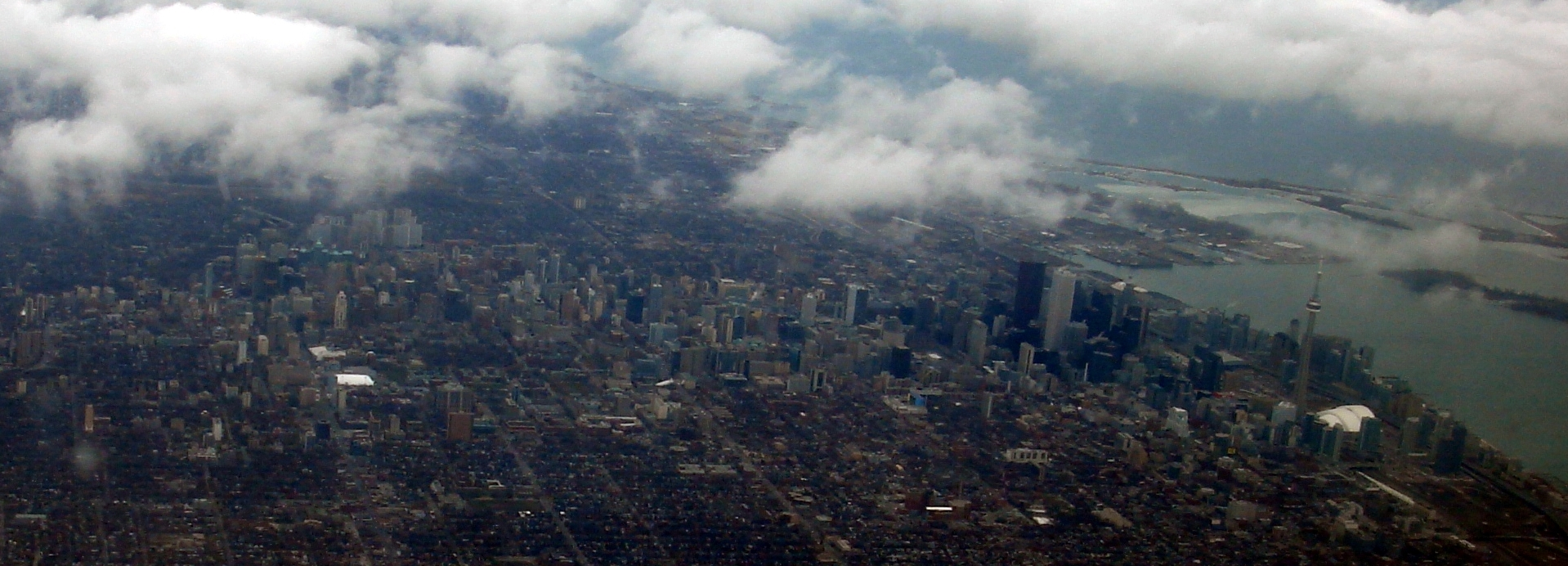
Aerial view of Downtown Toronto in 2007

- Districts of Toronto
  - Old Toronto
    - Downtown Toronto
    - East Toronto
  - East York
  - Etobicoke
  - Scarborough
  - North York
  - York
- Neighbourhoods in Toronto
  - City designated neighbourhoods in Toronto
  - Business improvement areas
- Toronto waterfront

==== Locations in Toronto ====
- Baseball parks in Toronto
- Cinemas in Toronto
- Hotels in Toronto
- Museums in Toronto
- Toronto Public Library branches
- Shopping malls in Toronto

===== Parks and zoos in Toronto =====
- List of Toronto parks
- Riverdale Zoo
- Toronto Zoo

===== Other =====
- Allan Gardens
- Art Gallery of Ontario
- Black Creek Pioneer Village
- Canada's Walk of Fame
- Canada's Wonderland in Vaughan, Ontario
- Canadian Aboriginal Festival
- Canadian National Exhibition
- Caribana Festival
- Casa Loma
- Centreville Amusement Park
- Cherry Beach
- CHUM-City Building
- CN Tower
- Colborne Lodge
- Design Exchange
- Distillery District
- Fort Rouillé
- Fort York
- Gibraltar Point Lighthouse
- Gibson House
- Harbourfront
- Harbourfront Centre
- Hockey Hall of Fame
- Liberty Grand
- Little Canada
- Little Glenn
- Medieval Times
- Montgomery's Inn
- Olympic Spirit Toronto
- Ontario Place
- Ontario Science Centre
- Ripley's Aquarium of Canada
- Rogers Centre
- Royal Ontario Museum
- Spadina House
- St. Lawrence Market
- Taste of the Danforth
- Wet'n'Wild Toronto, in Brampton, Ontario
- Yorkville

===== Historic locations in Toronto =====
- List of historic places in Toronto
  - List of historic Toronto fire stations
  - List of National Historic Sites of Canada in Toronto

=== Demographics of Toronto ===
- Demographics of Toronto

== Government and politics of Toronto ==
Government and politics of Toronto

- Municipal elections of Toronto
- City of Toronto government
  - List of mayors of Toronto
  - Toronto City Council
    - Speaker of Toronto City Council
- Toronto Police Service
- Crime in Toronto
  - Graffiti in Toronto
- Sister cities of Toronto

== History of Toronto ==
History of Toronto

=== History of Toronto, by period ===
- Timeline of Toronto history
- Great Fire of Toronto
  - Great Fire of Toronto (1849)
  - Great Fire of Toronto (1904)
- Centennial of the City of Toronto

=== History of Toronto, by region ===
- History of neighbourhoods in Toronto
  - List of reeves of the former townships and villages in Toronto
- Old Toronto

=== History of Toronto, by subject ===
- Amalgamation of Toronto

== Culture in Toronto ==
Culture in Toronto

- Architecture of Toronto
  - List of tallest buildings in Toronto
  - List of oldest buildings and structures in Toronto
- Cuisine of Toronto
- Events in Toronto
  - Annual events in Toronto
  - List of Asian events in Toronto
- List of Toronto Public Library branches
- Media in Toronto
  - List of multicultural media in the Greater Toronto Area
- Museums in Toronto
- Recreation in Toronto
  - Annual events in Toronto
- List of people from Toronto
  - List of University of Toronto people
- Symbols of Toronto
  - Flag of Toronto
  - Coat of arms of Toronto

=== Art in Toronto ===
- List of fiction set in Toronto
- Graffiti in Toronto

==== Cinema of Toronto ====
- Cinemas in Toronto
- List of filming locations in Toronto
- List of films set in Toronto
- List of films shot in Toronto
- Toronto International Film Festival
- Toronto Film Critics Association

==== Music of Toronto ====
- List of songs about Toronto
- Toronto Jazz Festival

=== Religion in Toronto ===
- List of cemeteries in Toronto
- Christianity in Toronto
  - Archbishop of Toronto and Eastern Canada
  - Bishop of Toronto
  - List of cathedrals in Toronto
  - Diocese of Toronto
  - Ecclesiastical Province of Toronto
  - Anglicanism in Toronto
    - List of Anglican churches in Toronto
    - Anglican Diocese of Toronto
  - Catholicism in Toronto
    - Roman Catholic Archbishops of Toronto
    - Roman Catholic Archdiocese of Toronto
    - List of Roman Catholic churches in Toronto
  - First Christian Reformed Church of Toronto
  - First Evangelical Lutheran Church of Toronto
  - First Unitarian Congregation of Toronto
  - List of Orthodox churches in Toronto
  - List of Presbyterian churches in Toronto
  - List of United Church of Canada churches in Toronto
- Judaism in Toronto
  - List of synagogues in the Greater Toronto Area
  - History of the Jews in Toronto

=== Sports in Toronto ===
Toronto sports

- Amateur sport in Toronto
- List of sports teams in Toronto
- Baseball in Toronto
  - Toronto Blue Jays (Major League Baseball)
    - History of the Toronto Blue Jays
    - List of Toronto Blue Jays broadcasters
    - List of Toronto Blue Jays first-round draft picks
    - List of Toronto Blue Jays managers
    - List of Toronto Blue Jays Opening Day starting pitchers
    - List of Toronto Blue Jays owners and executives
    - List of Toronto Blue Jays seasons
    - List of Toronto Blue Jays team records
  - Baseball parks in Toronto
- Basketball in Toronto
  - Toronto Raptors (National Basketball Association)
    - List of Toronto Raptors broadcasters
    - List of Toronto Raptors head coaches
    - List of Toronto Raptors seasons
- Football in Toronto
  - Soccer in Toronto
    - Toronto FC (Major League Soccer)
      - List of Toronto FC players
      - List of Toronto FC Players of the Year
  - Canadian football in Toronto
    - Toronto Argonauts (Canadian Football League)
      - List of Toronto Argonauts head coaches
      - List of Toronto Argonauts seasons
- Hockey in Toronto
  - List of Toronto Hockey Club seasons
  - Toronto Maple Leafs (National Hockey League)
    - History of the Toronto Maple Leafs
    - List of Toronto Maple Leafs award winners
    - List of Toronto Maple Leafs broadcasters
    - List of Toronto Maple Leafs draft picks
    - List of Toronto Maple Leafs general managers
    - List of Toronto Maple Leafs head coaches
    - List of Toronto Maple Leafs players
    - List of Toronto Maple Leafs records
    - List of Toronto Maple Leafs seasons
  - Toronto Marlies (American Hockey League)
- Lacrosse in Toronto
  - Toronto Rock (National Lacrosse League)
- Running in Toronto
  - Toronto Marathon

== Economy and infrastructure of Toronto ==
Economy of Toronto

- Toronto Board of Trade
- Health in Toronto
  - Toronto Public Health
  - List of hospitals in Toronto
- Public services in Toronto
  - Toronto Fire Services
  - Toronto Police Service
  - Toronto Public Library
- Tourism in Toronto
  - Attractions in Toronto

=== Transportation in Toronto ===
Transportation in Toronto

- List of airports in the Greater Toronto Area
- Cycling in Toronto
- List of roads in Toronto
  - List of east–west roads in Toronto
  - List of north–south roads in Toronto
- List of bridges in Toronto
- Toronto Transit Commission (bus system)
  - Toronto Transit Commission accessibility
  - Toronto Transit Commission buses
  - List of Toronto Transit Commission bus routes
  - Toronto Transit Commission fares
  - Toronto Transit Commission personnel
- Toronto streetcar system
  - Toronto streetcar system rolling stock
- Toronto subway and RT
  - List of Toronto subway and RT stations
  - Toronto subway rolling stock

== Education in Toronto ==
Education in Toronto

- Conseil scolaire catholique MonAvenir
- Conseil scolaire Viamonde
- Toronto Catholic District School Board
- Toronto District School Board

=== University of Toronto ===
University of Toronto

- Campuses
  - St. George
  - Mississauga (not in Toronto)
  - Scarborough
- Faculties & divisions
  - Ontario Institute for Studies in Education
  - Rotman School of Management
  - Toronto School of Theology
  - Faculty of Applied Science and Engineering
  - John H. Daniels Faculty of Architecture, Landscape, and Design
  - Faculty of Arts and Science
  - Faculty of Dentistry
  - Faculty of Information
  - Henry N.R. Jackman Faculty of Law
  - Temerty Faculty of Medicine
  - Lawrence Bloomberg Faculty of Nursing
  - School of Graduate Studies
- Other departments and programs
  - University Health Network
  - Institute for Aerospace Studies
  - Canadian Institute for Theoretical Astrophysics
  - Institute of Biomaterials and Biomedical Engineering
  - Munk School of Global Affairs and Public Policy
  - Trudeau Centre for Peace and Conflict Studies
  - Pontifical Institute of Mediaeval Studies
  - Fields Institute
  - Joint Centre for Bioethics
  - Institute of Child Study
  - Massey Lectures
  - Toronto School of communication theory
  - University of Toronto Press
  - McClelland & Stewart
  - UTEC
- Facilities
  - List of University of Toronto buildings
  - Convocation Hall
  - University of Toronto Libraries
  - Robarts Library
  - Thomas Fisher Rare Book Library
  - Gerstein Science Information Centre
  - Soldiers' Tower
  - Varsity Arena
  - Varsity Stadium
  - Koffler Scientific Reserve
  - David Dunlap Observatory
  - Toronto Magnetic and Meteorological Observatory
  - University of Toronto Schools
- Student life
  - University of Toronto Students' Union
  - The Varsity
  - The Underground
  - CIUT-FM
  - CFRE-FM
  - Hart House Theatre
  - Hart House Review
  - Toronto Varsity Blues
  - Jennings Cup
- Affiliated colleges
  - Emmanuel College
  - Innis College
  - Knox College
  - Massey College
  - New College
  - Regis College
  - University of St. Michael's College
  - University of Trinity College
  - University College
  - Victoria University
  - Woodsworth College
  - Wycliffe College
- List of University of Toronto people

=== York University ===
York University

- Keele Campus
- Glendon College

=== Toronto Metropolitan University ===
Toronto Metropolitan University

- Campus

=== George Brown College ===
George Brown College

- Casa Loma campus
- St. James campus
- Waterfront campus

=== Humber College ===
Humber College

=== Seneca College ===
Seneca College

== See also ==
- Outline of geography
  - Outline of North America
    - Outline of Canada
      - Outline of Ontario
- City of Toronto Act
- City of Toronto Archives
- City of Toronto Emergency Management Office (OEM)
- City of Toronto Heritage Property Inventory
- Convocation Hall (University of Toronto)
- Hart House (University of Toronto)
- Hill v. Church of Scientology of Toronto
- History of Toronto Island Airport
- Islamic Institute of Toronto
- Lesbian Organization of Toronto
- Live in Toronto (disambiguation)
- Live in Toronto (Psychic TV album)
- Live in Toronto Canada
- Live Peace in Toronto 1969
- Metropolitan Community Church of Toronto
- National Football League in Toronto
- Parachute School of Toronto
- Plague City: SARS in Toronto
- Poet Laureate of Toronto
- Proposal for the Province of Toronto
- R. v. Church of Scientology of Toronto
- Serbs of Toronto
- Sir John Robinson, 1st Baronet, of Toronto
- Sringeri Temple of Toronto
- St. Hilda's College, University of Toronto
- Stephenson House (University of Toronto)
- Taiwanese Canadian Association of Toronto
- Tanenbaum Community Hebrew Academy of Toronto
