= Annual events in Toronto =

Numerous festivals, shows and exhibitions are held annually in Toronto. They include:

== January ==
- Winterlicious
- Toronto Design Offsite Festival
- Toronto Design Week

== February ==
- Canadian International AutoShow - at the Metro Convention Centre
- Winter City

== March ==
- Cinéfranco
- St Patrick's Day Parade
- Canadian Music Week

== April ==
- Sporting Life 10K
- Hot Docs
- Khalsa Day parade, first held in 1986
- Toronto Fashion Week

== May ==
- Cabbagetown Forsythia Festival - Held the first Sunday in May.
- Doors Open Toronto
- Science Rendezvous
- Anime North - Usually held the weekend following Victoria Day, although some times during the long weekend.
- Toronto Comic Arts Festival at Toronto Reference Library

== June ==
- Luminato a festival of arts and creativity established in 2007
- North by Northeast, an annual five-day live music and film festival and music conference
- Pride Week a large gay pride festival
- Toronto Downtown Jazz Festival - various indoors and located throughout the downtown core
- MuchMusic Video Awards
- Toronto International Dragon Boat Festival - Centre Island
- Fête de la Musique (World Music Day) - June 21 annually. Musicians from all over the world perform free concerts throughout the city
- VRTO Virtual & Augmented Reality World Conference & Expo - a virtual reality conference that takes place the 3rd week of June, annually.
- World Naked Bike Ride, annually since June 2004.

== July ==
- Toronto Fringe Festival, Toronto's largest theatre festival
- Honda Indy Toronto at Exhibition Place
- Caribana is North America's largest street festival, showcasing Caribbean/West Indian culture (in some years early August).
- Beaches International Jazz Festival - The Beaches
- Summerlicious
- ConBravo! fandom convention
- Brickfete LEGO Fan Festival
- Rogers Cup - An ATP World Tour Masters 1000 and WTA Tour Premier 5 tennis tournament held annually since 1881.

== August ==
- The Canadian National Exhibition (CNE, or "the Ex").
- The Taste of the Danforth festival showcases the mostly Greek culture of The Danforth and has expanded to include other cultures of the area.
- Fan Expo Canada
- Veld Music Festival - Largest annual electronic dance music festival in Canada

== September ==
- The Canadian International Air Show -off CNE grounds over Lake Ontario
- The Terry Fox Run
- The Toronto International Film Festival is considered one of the big three global film events, with Cannes and Berlin, with more screens and more films than either.
- Cabbagetown Fall Festival, - Held the second weekend in September.
- FIVARS Festival of International Virtual & Augmented Reality Stories third week September
- Virgin Festival, based on the British festival
- Word on the Street - Canada's largest, annual outdoor book and magazine festival
- Taste of the Kingsway - A celebration of food and music, the Taste of the Kingsway festival is a family-friendly way to honour the community.
- Roncesvalles Polish Festival - Join us at the Roncesvalles Polish Festival, North America's largest celebration of Polish culture, for a weekend of great local and international music, including Polish folklore, Polka and Euro dance bands, family fun zones, entertainment from near and far on 3 stages, a local artisan zone, and pierogi, bigos and Paczki, of course! Combining old world charm with today’s Roncesvalles Village, well-known as one of Toronto’s most vibrant communities, festival attendees will find a wide variety of global cuisines, exceptional shopping, and quality services from the amazing businesses located on the street.

== October ==
- Nuit Blanche
- The Toronto Waterfront Marathon - One of just five IAAF Gold Label marathons in North America, run along the waterfront starting and ending in downtown Toronto
- The Toronto After Dark Film Festival

== November ==
- The Canadian FinTech Awards. An annual Gala Awards Dinner to celebrate Canadian Innovation, which was started in 2015.
- The Toronto Santa Claus Parade (Started in 1904 with just a single float, it now boasts 32 floats, 24 bands, and 2000 participants. It is one of the biggest productions in North America, and broadcast to many countries around the world.)
- Cavalcade of Lights.
- The Royal Agricultural Winter Fair, an annual fall fair started in 1922.

== December ==
- Reviving the Islamic Spirit

== See also ==
- List of Asian events in Toronto
