= The Argues =

The Argues may refer to:

- The Argues (band), Canadian band
- The Argues: The Movie, 2010 Australian film
