= Hollywood North =

American film production in Canada

Hollywood North is a colloquialism used to describe film production industries and/or film locations north of its namesake, Hollywood, California. The term has been applied principally to the film industry in Canada, specifically to the cities Toronto and Vancouver.

== Use of the term ==
The title has been claimed for both Toronto, Ontario and Vancouver, British Columbia.

=== Toronto ===
Official poster of the 2002 Toronto International Film Festival

One of the earliest Hollywood television series to shoot in Toronto was the 1957 production Hawkeye and the Last of the Mohicans. The city has been associated with the nickname 'Hollywood North' since the late 1970s, due to its role as a production centre for both domestic and international film projects. In 1979 Toronto mayor John Sewell announced that Canada had become the third largest movie production centre after Los Angeles and New York.

In 2002 the year Toronto's Film and Television industry accounted for $1.16 billion towards the city's economy, and the city's mayor Mel Lastman proclaimed "Toronto is Hollywood North". In 2003 the Toronto Ontario Film Office was established in Los Angeles to promote the benefits of filming in the city of Toronto and the province of Ontario. With the TOFO Ontario is the only Canadian province to have an office in Hollywood. The province of Ontario had 230 film projects with $946 million in production spending in 2010.

Ontario ranks as the second largest film and television production centre in Canada, and fourth overall in North America behind California, New York, and British Columbia. Although a decline in BC's domestic production and an increase of $300 million or 31% over the previous year, allowed Ontario to surpass British Columbia for the largest production centre in Canada in 2011, British Columbia has once again surpassed Ontario in recent years, as it had historically. The province recorded $1.26 billion in production activity in 2011, its largest year ever. By 2017, Toronto itself grew to $2 billion.

Toronto ranks fourth as an exporter of television programming in North America and behind only Los Angeles, New York City, and Vancouver among North American cities in total industry production, $903.5 million were spent by production companies on 209 major production film and television projects in 2010 in Toronto. In 2011, the film industry contributed $1.13 billion from 244 on location film and television projects to Toronto the largest figure since the year 2002, this increase in revenue over the past years was attributed to a film tax credit offered by the provincial government in 2009. A 47% increase in Hollywood productions in 2011 over 2010 was mostly attributed to this tax credit among others. In 2012 on location film and television production increased again to $1.2 billion generated.

Toronto is the headquarters of Nelvana, the largest animation company in Canada and one of the largest animation/children's entertainment studios in the world. Toronto was also the headquarters of Alliance Atlantis, the largest film distribution company in Canada, and the 12th largest film and TV distribution company in the world, which distributes films and television across all of North America and parts of Europe.

Pinewood Toronto Studios located in Toronto, Ontario, Canada is Canada's largest film and television production complex, with more than 23,000 m^{2} (250,000 sq ft) of production space. It contains the largest purpose-built sound stage in North America, capable of accommodating large blockbuster movies. Some have credited the completion of Pinewood Studios along with provincial tax credits as being responsible for the late 2000s/early 2010s surge in in-province Hollywood productions. Due to its ability to handle film productions on a scale not previously possible.

The Toronto Film and Television Office reported that in 2005 some 200 productions were completed in Toronto: 39 features, and 44 movies made for television, 84 television series, 11 television specials, and 22 MOW's (movies of the week). The Toronto Film and Television Office issued 4,154 location filming permits for 1,258 projects totalling 7,319 days of shooting. Toronto's domestic production industry benefits greatly financially from large treaty coproductions with international partners.

As with Vancouver, government tax incentives at both the provincial and federal level promote Toronto as a destination for many US film productions. The city is often used as a stand in for New York City and Chicago in film.

In addition to being a productions centre, Toronto is the home to the Toronto International Film Festival, which is considered by many in the film industry to be second only to Cannes in terms of influence or in instances actually rivaling it. It attracts numerous high-profile actors and film makers from around the globe to premiere their Films in Toronto and is generally considered the tip-off point to which the Oscar races begin.

Toronto is home to Canada's Walk of Fame, similar in appearance to the Hollywood Walk of Fame, honouring notable Canadians.

Toronto is the headquarters to the majority of Canada's national media outlets including: CBC Television, CTV, Global Television Network, MuchMusic, YTV, and entertainment programs ETalk and Entertainment Tonight. The city is the traditional host for the Gemini Awards, honouring the Canadian television industry.

=== Vancouver ===
Vancouver has been used as a filmmaking location for over a century, beginning with The Cowpuncher's Glove and The Ship's Husband, both shot in 1910 by the Edison Manufacturing Company. Isolated by distance from the domestic film production communities in Toronto and Montreal, it became known as "Hollywood North" for its role as a production centre for US feature films shot in British Columbia. The provincial government first established a film development office in 1977 to market the province to the Hollywood community. In 2000, BC crossed the billion-dollar mark in production for the first time, and in 2002, 75% of all Canadian foreign productions were based in British Columbia and Ontario. That same year British Columbia led the country in foreign film production receiving 44% of the Canadian total. This would grow to nearly 64% of the Canadian total by 2017/18.

British Columbia is currently the third largest production centre for film and television in North America, after Los Angeles and New York City, and has held this title for years with over 246 motion picture projects and $1.02 billion on production spending in 2010. Although declining domestic production in the province through 2011 and less competitive tax rates left BC ranking fourth in overall production after Ontario for a few years, British Columbia has regained its position as the third largest production centre in North America with American studios returning in droves thanks largely to existing infrastructure and talent. For years, beginning in the early-1990s, movies and television series produced in Vancouver carried the credit, "Production Executive: Stephen Sassen," the name of British Columbia's longtime film commissioner.

North Shore Studios — formerly Lionsgate Studios — and Vancouver Film Studios are among the two largest special effects stages in Canada. VFS being one of the largest production facility outside of Los Angeles; Bridge Studios, in Burnaby, British Columbia, has one of the largest special effects stages in North America. Mammoth Studios, a subsidiary of North Shore studios holds the largest film stages in the world, their largest at 11,509.1 m^{2} (123,883 sq ft). As of 2020, over 93,000 m^{2} (1,000,000 sq ft) of studio and production space is being added. Vancouver is also home to the world’s largest VFX/animation cluster with over 60 domestic and foreign-owned studios, and 17 educational institutions with motion picture production as a discipline.

The BC Film Commission reported that in 2005, more than 200 productions were completed in B.C.: 63 feature films, 31 television series, 37 movies-of-the-week, 15 television pilots, 5 miniseries, 20 documentaries, 16 short films and 24 animation projects. In 2006, spending on film and TV production in B.C. was $1.228 billion. The Great Recession of the late 2000s hit the film industry financially on all levels. By March 2008, the British Columbia film industry dramatically recovered with film spending at $1.2 billion, with foreign-film production increasing 146 percent and domestic animation by 79 percent. In total, 86 foreign productions including 40 feature-length films, were completed in 2008. The city is also host to the Vancouver International Film Festival and the Vancouver Film and Television Forum.

Vancouver is 1,725 kilometres (1,072 mi) from Hollywood, a three-hour airplane flight or a 20-hour drive. It is also in the same time zone as Los Angeles. This relative proximity, diverse geography, educational capacity, and local talent, coupled with government subsidies, is a major factor in the growth of Vancouver's production industry. Proximity reduces issues over operating hours, accessibility, travel time for principals, access to filmmaking infrastructure, and experience of crews.

== See also ==
- Canadian pioneers in early Hollywood
- List of filming locations in the Vancouver area
- List of filming locations in the British Columbia Interior
- List of filming locations in Toronto
- List of films shot in Toronto
