= Recreation in Toronto =

Cultural activities and events

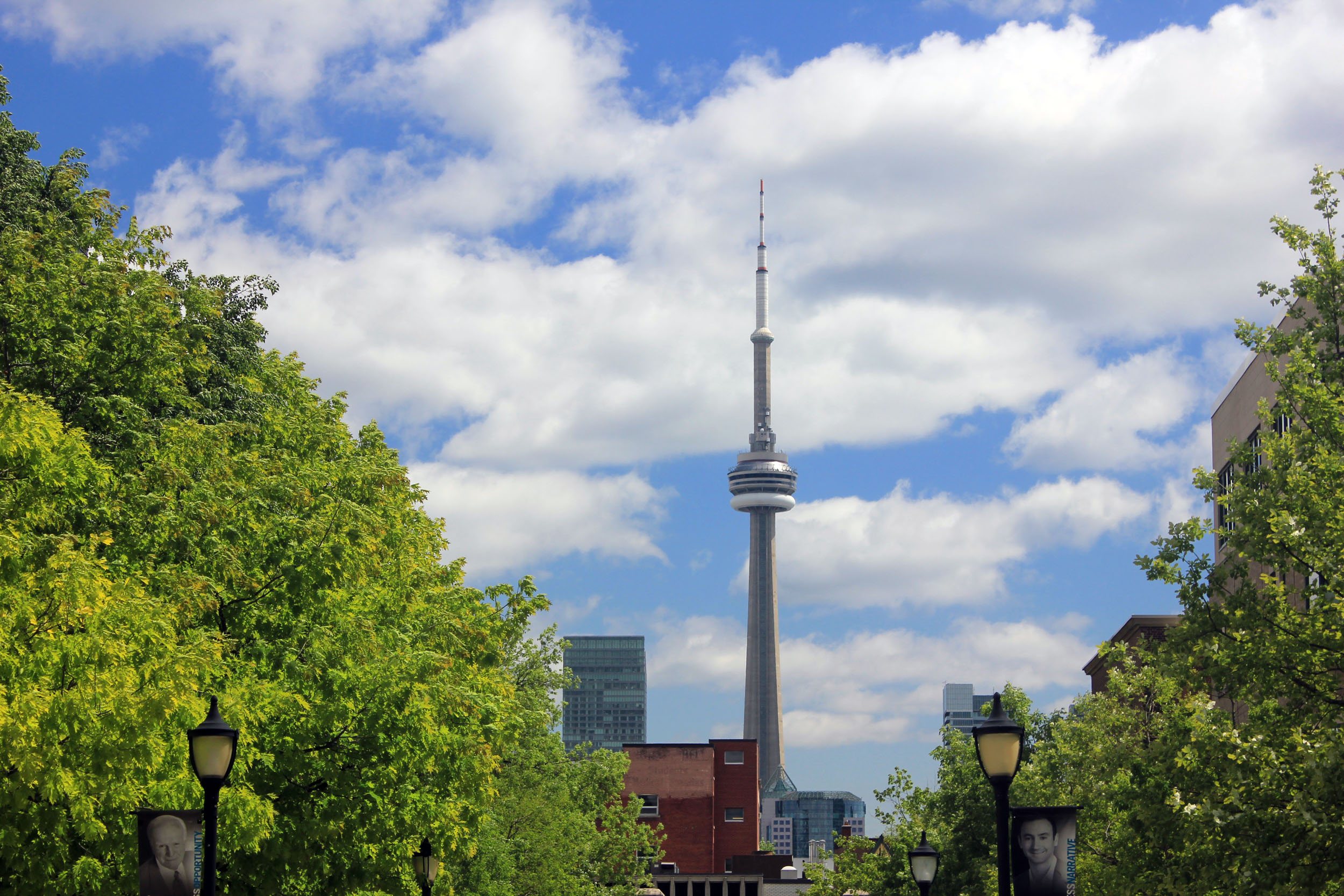
The CN Tower is one of several major attractions in Toronto.

Recreation in Toronto consists of a varied selection of activities and events throughout the city year-round. Toronto boasts renowned theatre and arts communities, has a wide range of recreational public services, and offers many attractions for both residents and tourists.

== Art and culture ==
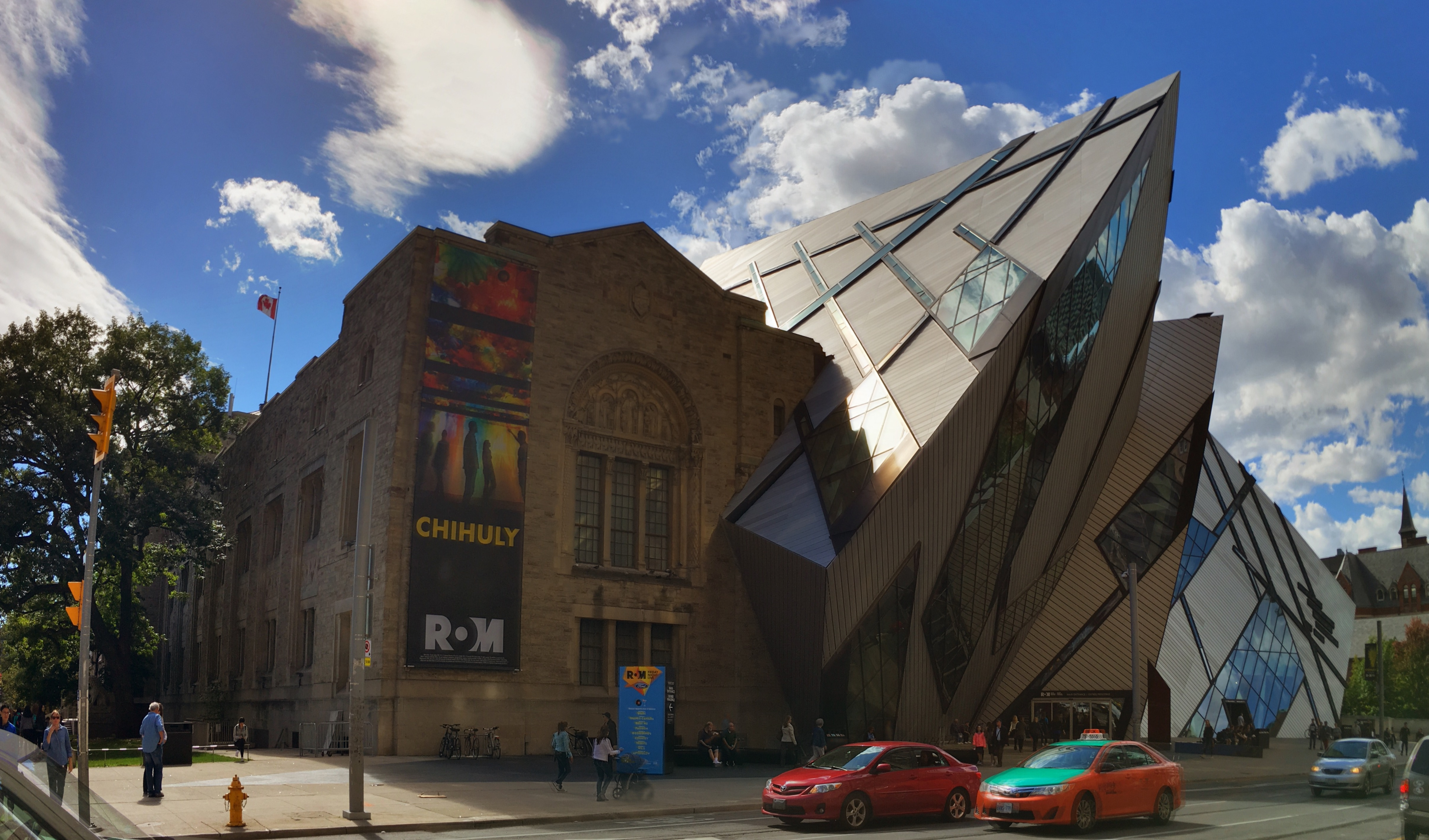
The Royal Ontario Museum is a museum of art, world culture and natural history. It is the largest, and most visited museum in Canada.

Toronto has a broad and diverse cultural sector, and is a major scene for theatre and other performing arts. More than fifty ballet and dance companies, six opera companies, and two symphony orchestras are located in the city. Toronto is home to the National Ballet of Canada, the Canadian Opera Company, and the Toronto Symphony Orchestra. Notable performance venues include the Four Seasons Centre for the Performing Arts, Roy Thomson Hall, the Princess of Wales Theatre, the Royal Alexandra Theatre, Massey Hall, the Toronto Centre for the Arts, the Elgin and Winter Garden Theatres and the Hummingbird Centre.

The Royal Ontario Museum (ROM) is a major museum for world culture and natural history. The Art Gallery of Ontario contains a large collection of Canadian, European, African and contemporary artwork. The Gardiner Museum of ceramic art consists of more than 2,900 ceramic works from Asia, the Americas, and Europe. The Bata Shoe Museum also features many unique exhibitions. The Don Valley Brick Works is a former industrial site, which opened in 1889, and has recently been restored as a park and heritage site.

== Annual events ==
The oldest annual fair in the world, the Canadian National Exhibition, is held annually at Exhibition Place. It is Canada's largest annual fair and the fifth largest in the world, with an average attendance of 1.5 million.

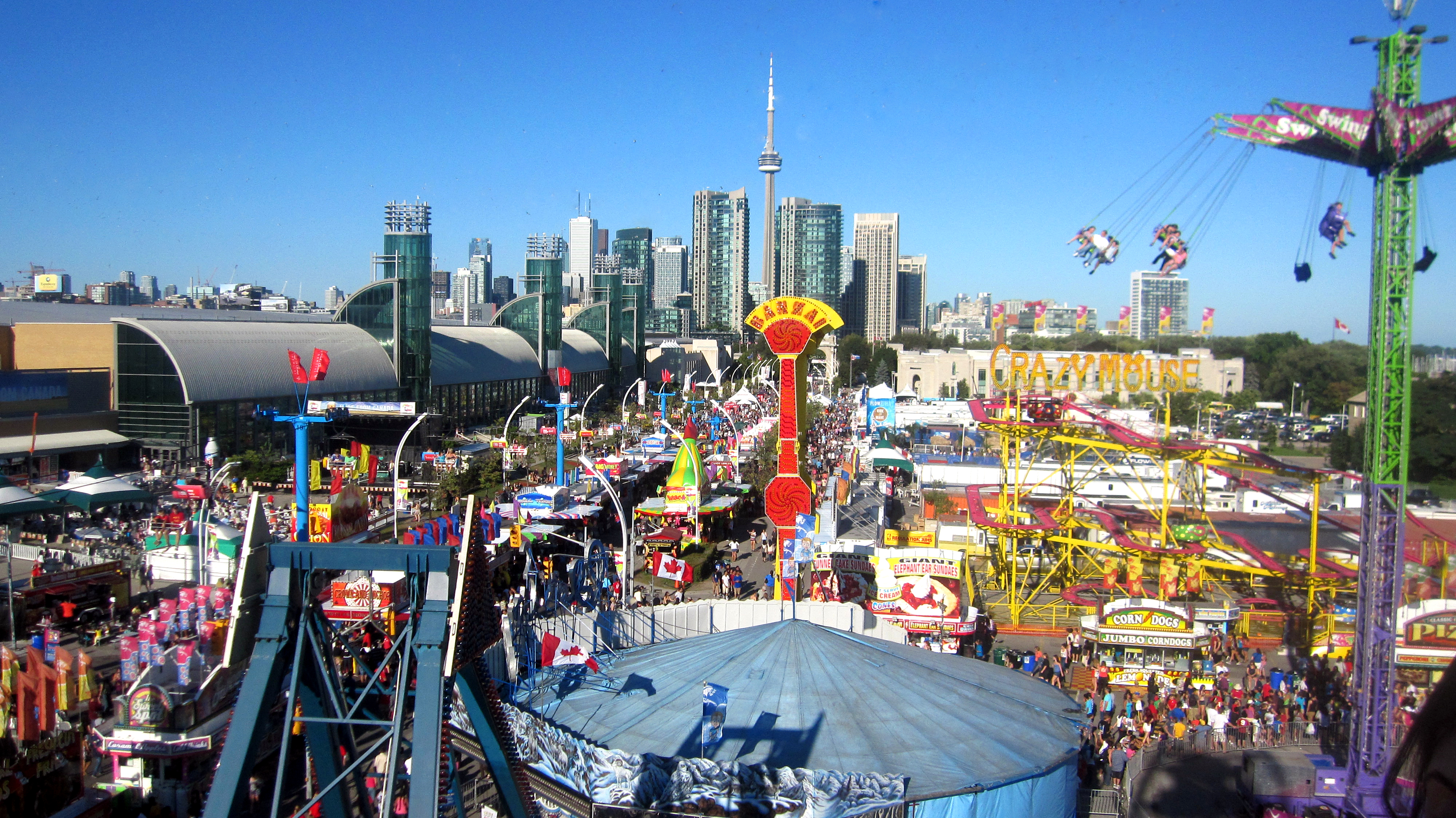
Held at Toronto's Exhibition Place, the Canadian National Exhibition is Canada's largest annual fair, averaging 1.5 million visitors each year.

Toronto's Caribana festival is one of North America's largest street festivals, taking place from mid-July to early August of every summer. The first Caribana took place in 1967 when the city's Caribbean community celebrated Canada's Centennial year. Forty years later, it has grown to attract one million people to Toronto's Lake Shore Boulevard annually. Tourism for the festival is in the hundred thousands, and each year, the event generates about $300 million in revenues.

Pride Week takes place in mid-June, and is one of the largest LGBT festivals in the world. It attracts more than one million people from all over the world, and is one of the largest events to take place in the city. Toronto is major centre for gay and lesbian culture and entertainment, and the gay village is located in the Church and Wellesley area of Downtown.

The Toronto Santa Claus Parade is the world's longest-running children's parade. Held annually in mid-November, the event draws more than half a million visitors each year. The parade is also televised and broadcast around the world.

Numerous other events take place in the city, such as the Toronto International Film Festival, which screens films in a number of a cinemas across Toronto. These are sponsored by federal, provincial and municipal government, by local business and international companies, by community groups, and by volunteer, charitable, educational and religious organizations.

== Attractions ==
Toronto's most famous landmark is the CN Tower. Defining the Toronto skyline, the 553.33 m (1,815 ft, 5 in) structure is an important telecommunications hub and a centre of tourism.

Doors Open Toronto is a free event held in the spring that showcases many of the city's unique and historically significant buildings to the public.

== Sport ==
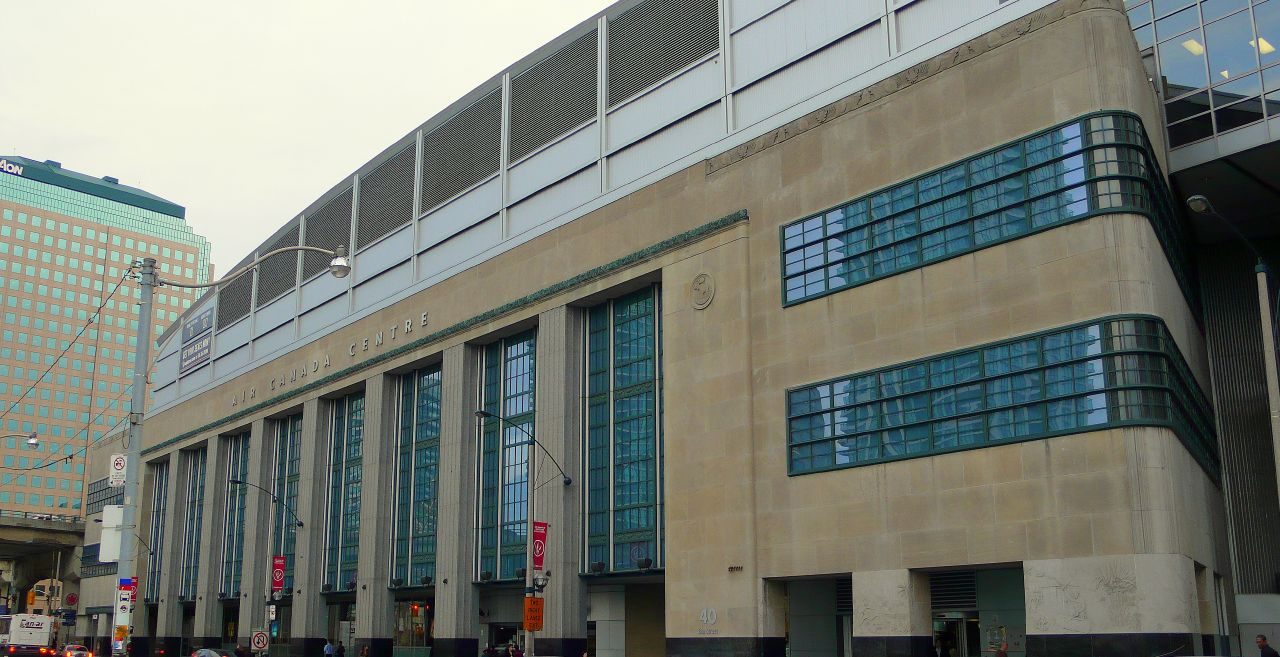
The Air Canada Centre hosts the Toronto Maple Leafs, Toronto Raptors, and the Toronto Rock.

The city has a broad range of professional sport franchises, with clubs in six major North American leagues. With approximately 200 matches contested in the city, attending a professional game is possible throughout the year. The city is famously known for the Toronto Maple Leafs hockey franchise, and is also home to the Toronto Argonauts, Toronto Blue Jays, Toronto Raptors, Toronto Rock, and Toronto FC.

Attending an amateur sporting event is affordable, with plentiful options throughout the city in many sports. There is also strong participation in amateur and recreational sporting activities in Toronto, reflecting the active urban lifestyle it promotes.

Annual sporting events in the city include professional events such as the Grand Prix of Toronto or amateur events such as the International Bowl. The city has also hosted international events, such as the 2007 FIFA U-20 World Cup.
