= The Argues (band) =

Canadian country rock band

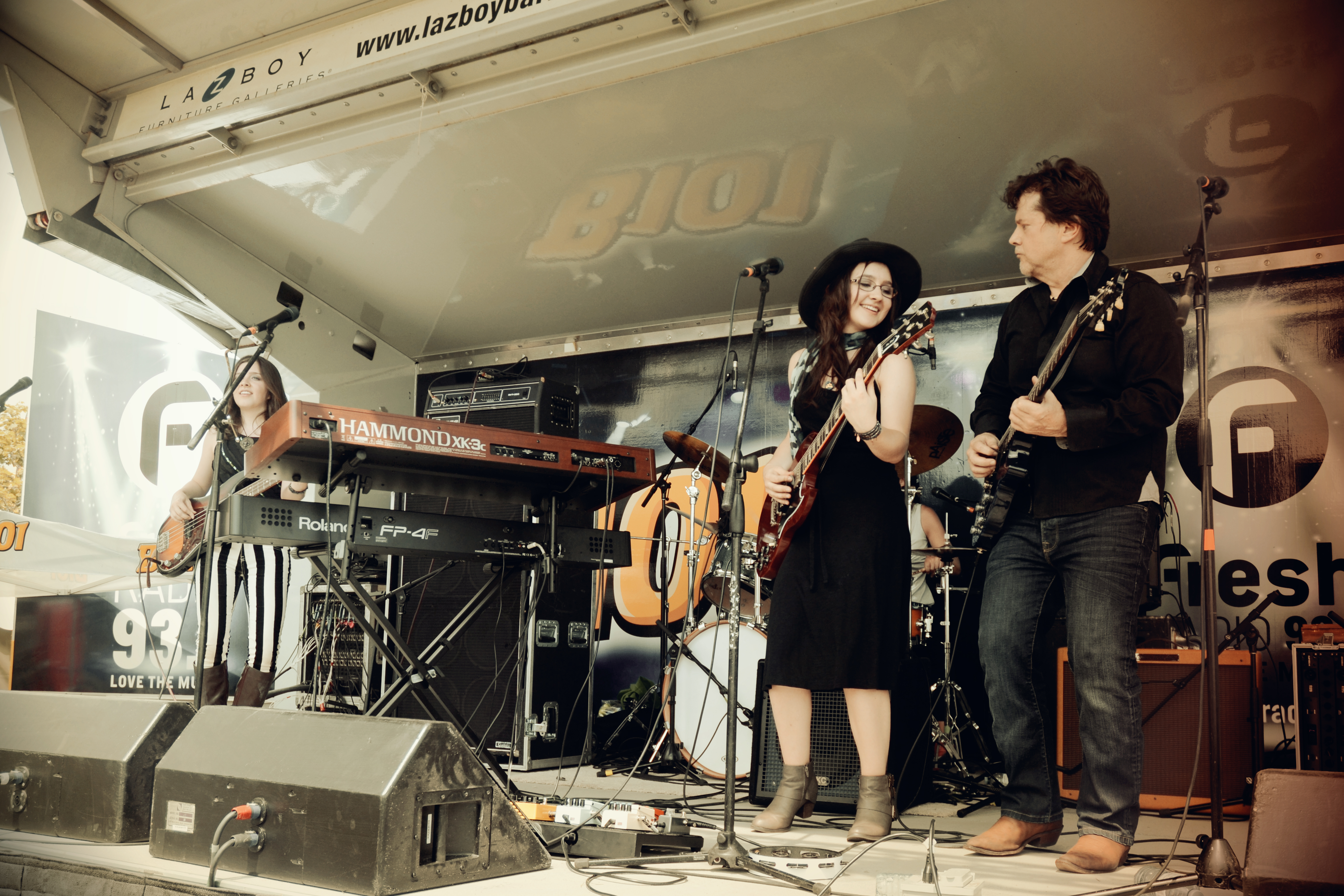
- The Argues performing at the Barrie Waterfront Festival in May 2016

Background information
- Origin: Toronto, Ontario, Canada
- Genres: Country rock, Country, pop rock, rock, Americana
- Years active: 2010–present
- Members: Sabrina Argue; Lauren Argue; Chantale Argue; Michael Argue
- Website: theargues.ca

The Argues are a Canadian country rock family band, consisting of multi-instrumentalist sisters Lauren and Sabrina Argue, their father Michael and mother Chantale. They released their debut album, Something New, on November 3, 2016. In 2017, The Argues won the award for Best Country at the Toronto Independent Music Awards.

== History ==
The Argues' music has been described as a new sound of blues, rock, and country music. Largely self-taught, the band does most of their songwriting at their log cabin near the Archipelago and in their studio near Barrie, Ontario.

== Shows and TV appearances ==
Since 2010, The Argues have performed at countless festivals, fundraisers, pubs, and corporate events, including performances at Manitoulin Country Fest, Toronto's Taste of the Kingsway, the Kitchener-Waterloo Oktoberfest, and the Toronto Ribfest, performing with audiences of over 6,000. The band has appeared on Rogers TV's Toronto Talent program and Toronto Sessions several times. They have worked with producer/engineer Michael Jack (Phase One, Radio Room), celebrity vocal coach Elaine Overholt, Jeff Healey Band's Joe Rockman, Texassippi Blues man Danny Brooks, and have shared the stage with the River Town Saints and Andrew Hyatt.

== Something New (2016) ==
The Argues' debut album, Something New, which features the band's original songs, was released on November 3, 2016. It was co-produced by Canadian producer/engineer Michael Jack. Since its release, their songs have been played on stations worldwide: New Zealand, England, the United States and Canada (including CBC's Fresh Air). They released two music videos for the album—for "The Best Is Yet To Be" and "I Don't Need You". They were also listed in the regional top-10 for CBC Searchlight 2017 for the song "Run Till You Drop."

=== TIMA and Singles ===
In October 2017, The Argues won the 2017 Toronto Independent Music Award for Best Country.

In June 2018, their single "I Don’t Need You" was released to Canadian Country Radio.

On June 20, 2019, The Argues released the single titled "Enjoy This Night."

== Discography ==
=== Albums ===
- Something New (2016)

=== Singles ===
- "I Don't Need You" (2018)
- "Enjoy This Night" (2019)

== Members ==
- Sabrina Argue - lead vocals, guitar, piano, harmonica, bass guitar
- Lauren Argue - lead vocals, bass guitar, guitar
- Chantale Argue - drums, percussion, backing vocals
- Michael Argue - guitar, backing vocals

== Awards and nominations ==
Year	Award	Category	Result	Ref
2017	Toronto Independent Music Awards	Best Country	Won	
