= List of Toronto Blue Jays managers =

The Toronto Blue Jays are members of the American League (AL) East Division in Major League Baseball (MLB). There have been 14 different managers of the Blue Jays, the only Canadian baseball franchise in Major League Baseball. In baseball, the head coach of a team is called the manager (or more formally, the field manager). They are the only team outside the United States to win a World Series, and the first team to win a World Series in Canada. John Schneider was the interim manager, until the club named him their full time manager in the off season and giving him a three-year contract after, replacing Charlie Montoyo; Montoyo was fired on July 13, 2022.

Cito Gaston has both managed and won the most games of any Blue Jays manager, with 1,731 games and 894 wins. He is followed by John Gibbons in both categories, with 1,258 games and 644 wins, who surpassed Bobby Cox's marks during his second stint as manager. Gaston is the only Blue Jays manager to win a World Series in 1992 and 1993, the fourth African-American manager in MLB history, and was the first African-American manager to win a World Series. Cox is the only Blue Jays manager to be awarded the AL Manager of the Year Award in 1985. Mel Queen has the best winning percentage by winning 80 percent of his 5 games coached.

== Overview ==
The first manager of the Blue Jays was Roy Hartsfield. While his tenure was marked by conflict between players and last place finishes, Hartsfield was supported by general manager Pat Gillick as they worked on the same long term management strategy: developing young players around which to build a team. Following the 1979 season, the Blue Jays opted not to renew his contract but offered him a position within the organization, which he declined. Bobby Mattick served as manager on subsequent one-year contracts until Bobby Cox became available. As Mattick accepted an executive position in the Blue Jays organization, Cox signed a one-year contract, which was extended until the 1985 season as he led the team out of last place for the first time, and into the playoffs in 1985. Shortly after Cox unexpectedly left the Blue Jays organization for the general manager position with the Atlanta Braves, third base coach Jimy Williams took over as manager. Following late-season collapses in 1987 and 1988, and a poor start to the 1989 season, Williams was fired and hitting coach Cito Gaston took over. Gaston managed the team for nine seasons, including two World Series wins, though batting coach Gene Tenace did substitute for him for several weeks in 1991 when Gaston was hospitalized with back pains.

In 1997, with the team in last place, Gaston was fired by general manager Gord Ash with 5 games remaining; pitching coach Mel Queen finished the season as manager. Ash, seeking a more aggressive management style, hired Tim Johnson for his breadth of experience and communication skills. Following an admission to lying about aspects of his military experience, a tactic he used to motivate players, he was fired during spring training in 1999 and Jim Fregosi was signed to a two-year contract. When Rogers Communications acquired the Blue Jays organization, among other management changes, Fregosi was replaced with Buck Martinez. In June 2002, as the team was struggling, new general manager J. P. Ricciardi fired Martinez and replaced him with third base coach Carlos Tosca. Tosca, and his successor John Gibbons, each managed the team for several seasons but both were fired mid-season as the team struggled: Tosca in August 2004 replaced by first base coach Gibbons, and Gibbons in June 2008 replaced by former manager Gaston. Following Gaston's retirement at the end of the 2010 season, former Boston Red Sox pitching coach, John Farrell was introduced as the new manager of the Toronto Blue Jays.

== Key ==
#	Number of coaches^{[a]}
GM	Regular-season games managed
W	Regular-season wins
L	Regular-season losses
Win%	Regular season winning percentage
PGM	Playoff games managed
PW	Playoff wins
PL	Playoff losses

== Managers ==
Note: Statistics are correct as of November 2, 2025

#^{[a]}	Image	Name	Term	GM	W	L	Win%	PGM	PW	PL	Achievements
1		Roy Hartsfield*	1977–1979	484	116	318	.240	—	—	—	
2		Bobby Mattick	1980–1981	268	104	164	.388	—	—	—	
3		Bobby Cox	1982–1985	647	355	292	.549	7	3	4	AL East Division Championship (1985); 1985 AL Manager of the Year
4		Jimy Williams	1986–1989	522	281	241	.538	—	—	—	
5		Cito Gaston	1989–1991	417	235	182	.564	10	2	8	2 AL East Division Championships (1989, 1991)
6		Gene Tenace^{[b]}	1991	33	19	14	.576	—	—	—	
—		Cito Gaston	1992–1997	902	448	454	.497	24	16	8	2 World Series Championships (1992, 1993)
7		Mel Queen	1997	5	4	1	.800	—	—	—	
8		Tim Johnson	1998	162	88	74	.543	—	—	—	
9		Jim Fregosi	1999–2000	324	167	157	.515	—	—	—	
10		Buck Martinez	2001–2002	215	100	115	.465	—	—	—	
11		Carlos Tosca	2002–2004	382	191	191	.500	—	—	—	
12		John Gibbons	2004–2008	610	305	305	.500	—	—	—	
—		Cito Gaston	2008–2010	412	211	201	.512	—	—	—	
13		John Farrell	2011–2012	324	154	170	.475	—	—	—	
—		John Gibbons	2013–2018	972	488	484	.502	20	10	10	AL East Division Champions (2015); AL Wild Card Winner (2016)
14		Charlie Montoyo	2019–2022	472	236	236	.500	2	0	2	
15		John Schneider	2022–present	721	381	340	.528	22	10	12	AL East Division Champions (2025); AL Champions (2025)

== Notes ==
- ^{a} A running total of the number of managers of the Blue Jays. Thus, any manager who has two or more separate terms as manager is only counted once.
- ^{b} Gene Tenace managed until the end of the 1991 Toronto Blue Jays season as Gaston was sidelined with a herniated disc; Gaston returned in time for the playoffs.
