= Sporting Life 10K =

Annual 10K running/walking event on Yonge Street, Toronto, Ontario, Canada

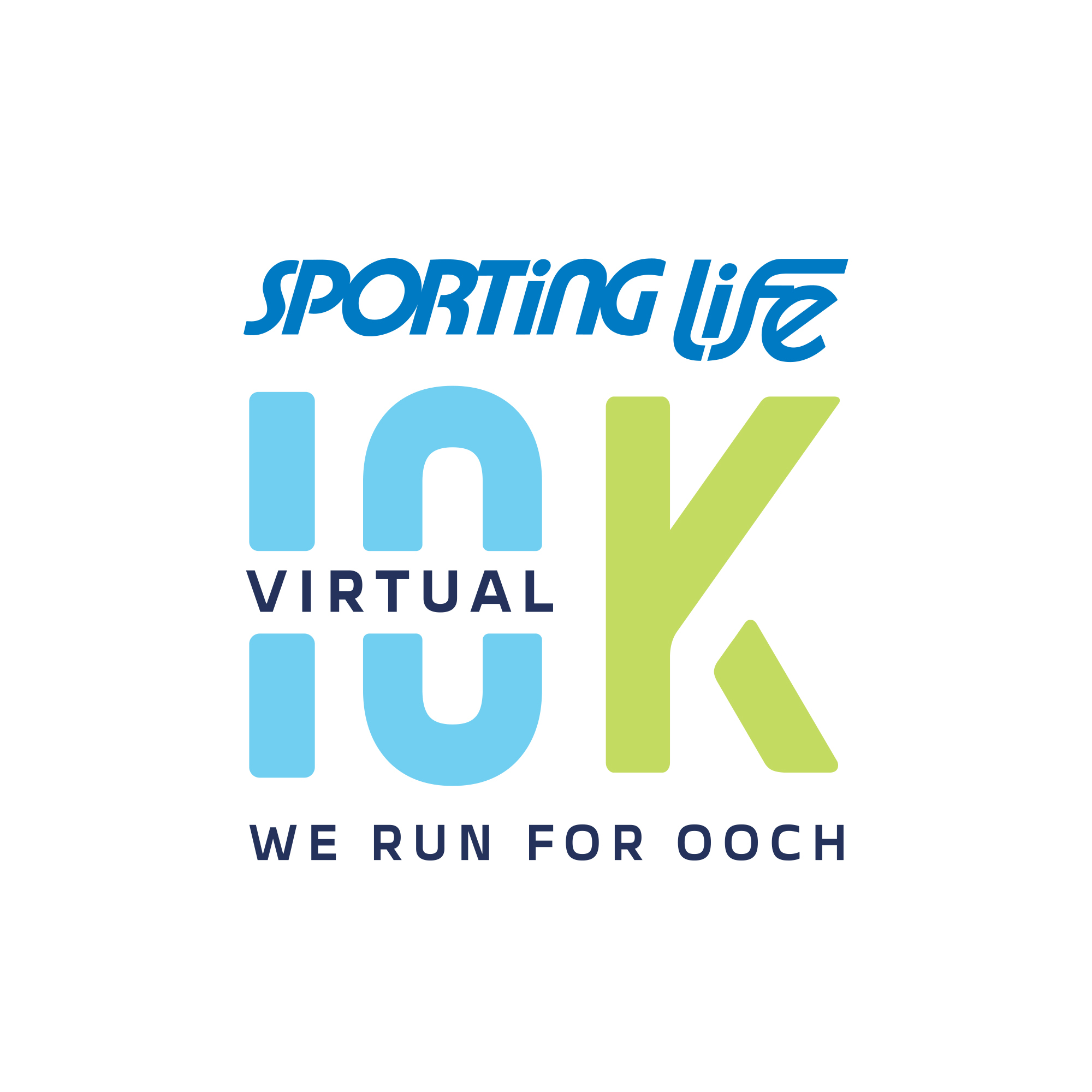
- Motto: Supporting Camp Oochigeas
- Purpose: To provide funding for Camp Oochigeas
- Frequency: Every year
- Inaugurated: 2003
- Headquarters: Toronto, Ontario
- Website: www.sportinglife10k.ca

The Sporting Life 10K is an annual 10K running/walking event on Yonge Street in Toronto, that has taken place every May since 2003. Money raised from the Sporting Life 10K goes towards funding Campfire Circle (formerly Camp Ooch and Camp Trillium) – which provides year-round programs for kids with childhood cancer or serious illness and their families in paediatric hospitals across Ontario, in local communities, and at two medically supported overnight camps.

27,000 people participated in 2013.
