= Sister cities of Toronto =

Friend and partner cities of the City of Toronto

Sister cities of Toronto are cities with which Toronto is twinned geographically and politically, with the goal of fostering human contact and cultural interchange.

== Relationships ==
As of 2024, the city maintains two types of relationships with other cities, partnership cities and International Project Agreements. Partnership cities are selected by city staff, with a focus toward economic development. International Project Agreements were established and are term limited to three years and focus on supporting activities and projects in both cities. As part of the 2024 review into the International Alliance Program, friendship cities were merged into partnership cities, and historical agreements were also established which are designated to expired or agreements that no longer meet criteria, but "honours the legacy and contribution of these relationships".

=== Partnership Cities ===
- Chongqing, China (1986)
- Frankfurt, Germany (1989)
- Warsaw, Poland (1990)
- Sagamihara, Japan (1991)
- Chicago, Illinois, United States (1991)
- Kyiv, Ukraine (1991)
- Milan, Italy (2003)
- Ho Chi Minh City, Vietnam (2006)
- Quito, Ecuador (2006)
- Rio de Janeiro, Brazil (2015)

=== International Project Agreements ===
- Lisbon, Portugal (2019)
- Matera, Italy (2019)

=== Historical Agreements ===
- Amsterdam, Netherlands
- Wuxi, China
- Shenzhen, China
- New York City, New York, United States
- Indianapolis, Indiana, United States
- Osaka, Japan
- São Paulo, Brazil
- Mexico City, Mexico
- Jaffna, Sri Lanka
- State of Maharashtra, India

== Formation of relationships ==
Toronto's city council considers requests to form relationships with other cities through its International Alliance Program. The criteria for both Partnership Cities and Friendship Cities were adopted by council December 5–7, 2005. Forming a relationship is primarily dependent on budget constraints of the Economic Development Committee, the municipal office which administers the program.

Proposals for new relationships are requested by city staff, of their own volition or on behalf of a third party. These proposals are analyzed for political and financial impact, and a recommendation is then presented to the Economic Development Committee.

== Principles for new relationships ==
=== Criteria for partnership cities ===
In order to prevent spurious proposals, cities that are candidates for a relationship with Toronto must satisfy the following conditions:

- there can be no more than one relationship in any region
- the candidate city cannot have a relationship with another Canadian city
- community groups must raise funds to support exchanges with Friendship Cities to which they have committed
- the federal government must have a relationship with the country in which the candidate city is located
- the candidate city must be an alpha, beta or gamma city

Proposals for new candidates are submitted to the General Manager of Economic Development; all proposals are analyzed and compiled into a yearly recommendation which coincides with the city's budget process.

=== Criteria for International Project Agreements ===
- Counterparty to the agreement must be a duly constituted municipal government in a county with which Canada has established relations and not be identified by the Government of Canada as a jurisdiction of concern, whether due to its nation’s human rights record or otherwise

== Candidate analysis ==
Once a proposal is presented to the General Manager of Economic Development, it is reviewed by staff to determine the candidate's status and applicability for formation of a relationship with Toronto. Whereas the criteria identified are minimal requirements, the review process is a more thorough investigation of the candidate city.

Recommendations to accept a proposal are often made only for cities which have strong similarities to, or compatibility with, Toronto. It must exhibit a diverse economic structure, instead of being dependent on one factor only, such as tourism. It should have sizeable population in the city core, and be the centre of an urban agglomeration.

=== Proposals for 2006 ===
On June 14, 2006, a report analyzing the candidacy of four cities was presented to, and considered by city council. Four cities were discussed:

- Lisbon was deemed to meet most of the criteria for a relationship, but was ultimately rejected because of Toronto's numerous relationships in the region, citing that "adding one more European city to an already unbalanced international portfolio is not recommended". The report noted that Lisbon and Toronto have very strong community and business relationships, as well as Toronto having a significant Portuguese population. Lisbon would later join Toronto’s International Alliance Program through their International Project Agreement initiative.
- Manila was rejected because it already has a relationship with another Canadian city (Winnipeg), and also because Toronto has a relationship with a city in that region
- Monte Carlo was rejected because it does not have a diverse economy, being dependent on tourism, and because it does not match demographically with Toronto
- Montego Bay was rejected for lack of compatibility both demographically and economically with Toronto; the report noted the strong presence of Jamaican culture in Toronto, and its lack of relationship with cities from the Caribbean
