= Great Fire of Toronto =

The Great Fire of Toronto or Great Toronto Fire may refer to:

- Great Fire of Toronto (1849)
- Great Fire of Toronto (1904)
