= Diocese of Toronto =

Diocese of Toronto may refer to:

- Anglican Diocese of Toronto
- Roman Catholic Archdiocese of Toronto
