= Live in Toronto =

Live In Toronto may refer to:

- Live in Toronto (Psychic TV album), a 1987 live album by Psychic TV
- Live Peace in Toronto 1969, an album by John Lennon and Yoko Ono
- Live in Toronto Canada, a 2001 album by Ween
- Live in Toronto (King Crimson album), a 2015 live album by King Crimson
- Live in Toronto (Art of Time Ensemble album)
