= Bishop of Toronto =

Bishop of Toronto may refer to:

- the archbishop of the Archdiocese of Toronto; see List of Roman Catholic archbishops of Toronto
- the bishop of the Anglican Diocese of Toronto
- the metropolitan of the Greek Orthodox Archdiocese of Canada
- the bishop of the Eparchy of Toronto and Eastern Canada
- the archbishop of the Ukrainian Orthodox Eparchy of Eastern Canada
