= Jennings Cup =

Hockey award

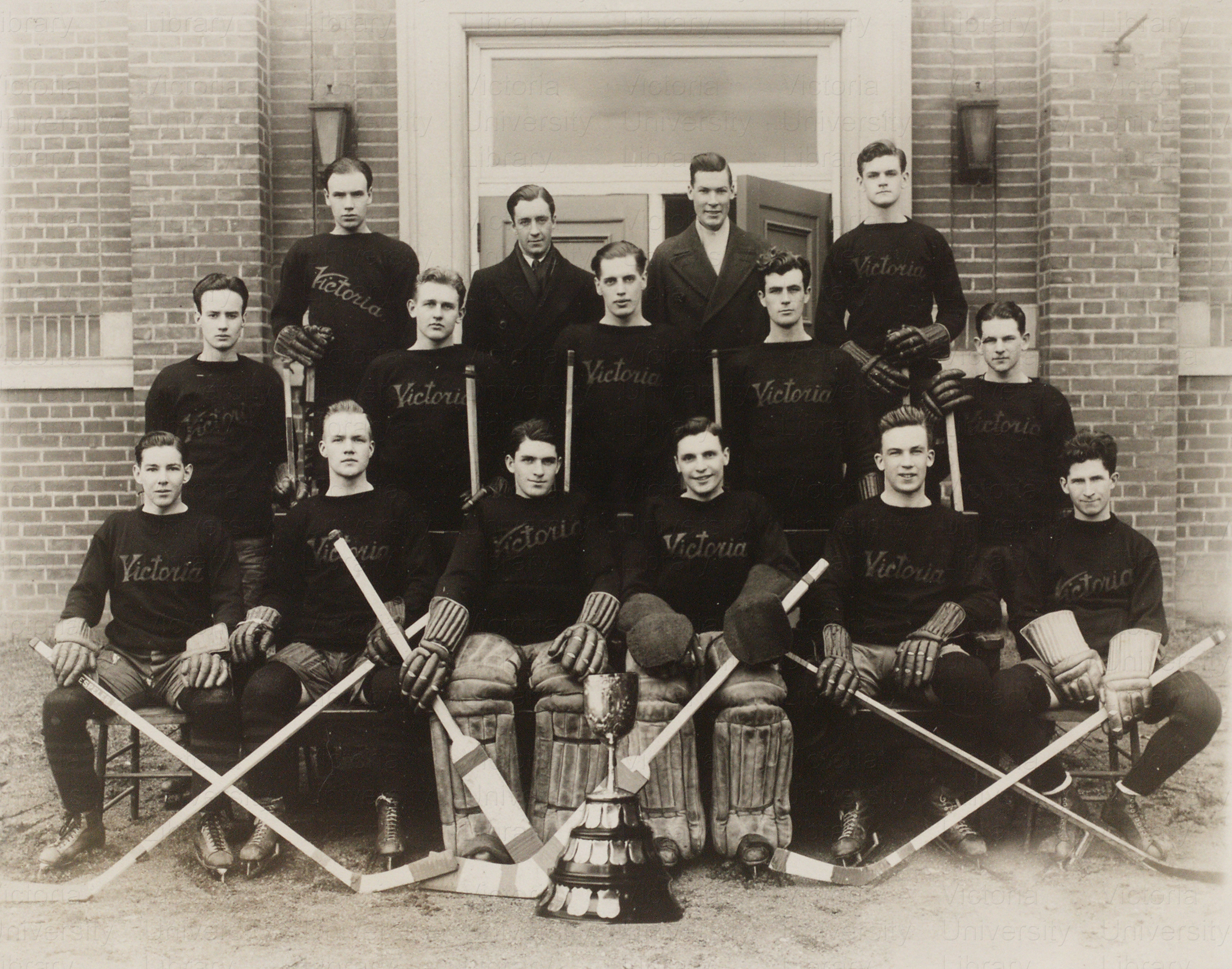
Victoria College Hockey Team, 1928, Jennings Cup Winners, Interfaculty Hockey Champions, 1926-27-28 (Victoria University Archives)

The Jennings Cup is the longest consecutively awarded ice hockey cup in the world. Presented in 1898 by William T. Jennings for the University of Toronto interfaculty ice hockey tournament, it has been disputed every year since then. At the present, it is disputed twice a year by the men's ice hockey teams of the three campuses of the University of Toronto.

== History ==
In 1898, the Jennings Cup was presented to the School of Practical Science, University of Toronto, for ice hockey competition. Its presenter, William T. Jennings, was a civil engineer, a chairman in Engineering, and a passionate hockey enthusiast who strongly believed in athletics. The donation of the cup brought attention to hockey at the university and sparked an interfaculty competition.

== Jennings Cup Winners ==
=== Interfaculty Tournament: 1899 - 1944 ===
Year	Team
1899–1900	Applied Science
1900–1901	McMaster College
1901–1902	Dentistry
1902–1903	Applied Science
1903–1904	Applied Science
1904–1905	Applied Science
1905–1906	Dentistry
1906–1907	Applied Science
1907–1908	Applied Science
1908–1909	Dentistry
1909–1910	Victoria College
1910–1911	Dentistry
1911–1912	Victoria College
1912–1913	Applied Science
1913–1914	Dentistry
1914–1915	Dentistry
1915–1916	Dentistry
1916–1917	Applied Science
1917–1918	Dentistry
1918–1919	Dentistry
1919–1920	Medicine
1920–1921	Trinity College
1921–1922	Victoria College
1922–1923	Dentistry
1923–1924	Medicine
1924–1925	Applied Science
1925–1926	Victoria College
1926–1927	Victoria College
1927–1928	Victoria College
1928–1929	Dentistry
1929–1930	St. Michael's College
1930–1931	St. Michael's College
1931–1932	Dentistry
1932–1933	Victoria College
1933–1934	Victoria College
1934–1935	Victoria College
1935–1936	Victoria College
1936–1937	Victoria College
1937–1938	Victoria College
1938–1939	Trinity College
1939–1940	Trinity College
1940–1941	Applied Science
1941–1942	Applied Science
1942–1943	Applied Science
1943–1944	University College

=== Intramural: 2001 - 2023 ===
Year	Season	Div 1 Contact	Div 1 Non-Contact	Div 2 Non-Contact	Div 3 Non-Contact
2001-02	Fall	UTSC	Law	FPEH	
	Winter		Law	FPEH	
2002-03	Fall	Skule A	FPEH	MBA	
	Winter	Victoria A	FPEH	MBA I	
2003-04	Fall		Skule B	FPEH	
	Winter	Victoria A	FPEH	MBA	
2004-05	Fall	Woodsworth	UTSC B	Victoria	
	Winter	Skule A	Biohazards	Victoria B	
2005-06	Fall	FPEH	Trinity	UTSC C	
	Winter	St. Michael's College A	UTSC B	Victoria	
2006-07	Fall	St. Michael's College A	Trinity	Meds A	
	Winter	Skule	Trinity	Biohazards	
2007-08	Fall	St. Michael's College A	University College	UTSC B	
	Winter	St. Michael's College A	Trinity	Rotman MBA	
2008-09	Fall	St. Michael's College A	Trinity	UTSC B	
	Winter	St. Michael's College A	Trinity	New	
2009-10	Fall	UTM B	UTSC B	Victoria	
	Winter	St. Michael's College A	UTSC C	Law	
2010-11	Fall	UTM	Victoria	Rotman MBA	
	Winter	St. Michael's College A	Victoria	PT/OT	
2011-12	Fall		UTSC	Rotman MBA	
	Winter		Rotman MBA		
2013-14	Fall		Victoria A	Architecture	
	Winter		Skule A	Dentistry	
2015-16	Winter	UTM			
2016-17		UTM			
2022-23	Fall				Chestnutters
2023-24	Fall				Law
2024-25	Fall		Rotman B	Medicine	Political Animals
