= Summerlicious and Winterlicious =

Food festivals in Toronto, Canada

Summerlicious and Winterlicious are two food festivals that are held each year in Toronto, Ontario, Canada. Winterlicious runs during the first two weeks of February, typically one of the poorest times of the year in terms of restaurant attendance. Summerlicious occurs at the start of July, also a slow time for restaurants. During the events major restaurants from across the city offer a limited menu of prix fixe dinners at a discount from typical prices. Currently the prices are $23, $28 or $33 for lunch and $33, $43 or $53 for dinner, with drinks and gratuity extra. Originally when the festival started, lunches were $15, $20, $25, while dinners were $25, $35, $45.

The promotion originally began in 2003 with 35 restaurants participating. Based on similar events in other cities it was designed to boost the restaurant trade at a slow time of the year. It was further promoted as part of the efforts to help Toronto recover from the tourism decline that followed the SARS epidemic in 2003. The event has since grown rapidly, becoming a popular semiannual event. In 2009, 150 restaurants were invited to participate in Winterlicious.

The event is run by the special events department of the city, and the city selects which restaurants are allowed to participate. There are several rules for becoming a participating restaurant, including certain price standards, a clean health inspection record, and good reviews from prominent Toronto restaurant review guides. It is also closed to chains. There is considerable demand to be included in Winterlicious. While the prices are discounted, participating restaurants see three to four times as much business. Non-participating restaurants are also correspondingly hurt during the event. Final invitations are at discretion of the city, which has been accused of choosing the largest and most prominent of the city's dining locations at the expense of smaller local ones. A number of other restaurants offer similar prix fixe combinations without participating in the promotion, but use different (though often similar) names to avoid infringement of the city's official marks.

The food festivals were paused during the COVID-19 pandemic and resumed in summer 2022.

Despite the large number of attendees and the stiff competition for restaurants to be included, the event is also regularly criticized. Customers complain about smaller food portions and lower ingredient quality. Restaurant workers complain about being overworked and forced to deal with over large numbers of uneducated diners.

Even with these criticisms, the licious promotions remain a very popular program and provide an opportunity for restaurants to make money during a typically otherwise slow time of the year. In Winterlicious 2009, 180,000 meals were served over 2 weeks, resulting in $12 million in economic impact for the City of Toronto.
