= Parachute School of Toronto =

Defunct parachuting and skydiving centre

Coordinates: 44°10′00″N 078°56′00″W

Parachute School of Toronto (often abbreviated as PST) was a Canadian Sport Parachuting Association affiliated parachuting centre and skydiving drop zone operating from the Baldwin_Airport, in Georgina, Ontario.

== General information ==
The drop zone operated one piston-powered aircraft (a Cessna 206 registration C-FEZN ) year round, and seasonally leased (May through October) one Turbine engine aircraft. For the 2010 season, the Turbine engine available was a Shorts Skyvan holding a maximum of 21 jumpers, in other years the club has leased a Cessna Grand Caravan and occasionally a De_Havilland_Canada_DHC-6_Twin_Otter. The school provided student training in the Static line progression system and tandem skydiving. All of the rigs used for student operation contained Automatic activation devices. There are packers, indoor carpeted packing area, rental rigs, diner and an in-house Parachute rigger available. The dro pzone operated year-round, primarily on weekends and holidays.

== Historical information ==
The centre was formed when the Damascas Parachute Association of Toronto relocated to an airstrip north of Arthur, Ontario (now reverted to farmland), where it had been operating for 27 years, between 1974 and 2001.

The Arthur location was known to be one of the last remaining public skydiving centres in North America to use exclusively round military T-10 style parachutes for initial training. Upon the relocation to the Baldwin location, new modern rectangular ram air canopies were acquired, and the centre also began focusing on providing Tandem skydives.

The school operated from the Baldwin Airport. between 2002 (after its original founder, Lloyd Kallio, retired and sold the original location) until winter 2020 when its lease was not renewed by the Baldwin Airport. It has not operated since then, as there has been a need to find a new suitable location. The school's official Facebook page has not seen activity since spring 2021.

In 2022, the centre briefly posted it was to began operations at the Seagrave/North Port Aerodrome in the Scugog / Port_Perry area, but airspace approval for parachute operations fell through. The last official update (Jun 26, 2022) from Adam Mabee, current owner, indicated the school was still looking for a suitable location to relocate. At this time the school's website is offline and operations have not resumed.

== Notable events ==
In 2008, Parachute School of Toronto was the host of the Ontario Provincial Skydiving Championships. This event had not been held in 15 years and was revived by members of PST. PST once again hosted this event in September 2009.

In August 2009, PST organized a national reunion to bring together skydivers from across the country who were instrumental in the development of the sport in Canada. The reunion will also facilitate a Canadian POPs ("Parachutists Over Phorty") record attempt.

== Online Presence ==
Parachute School of Toronto also has an interactive online presence via both Facebook, Twitter and public forums. Online user reviews of the dropzone have been very favourable.

== Deaths and Notable Incidents ==
The centre is notable for having three fatal accidents between July 2013 and July 2014. A total of 4 fatalities had occurred during the operations at Baldwin airport.

- Jul 5 2014, a 39-year-old man (Brad Vale) died after a crash during a high performance swoop landing.
- May 17 2014, a 28-year-old woman (Alana Shamrock) was killed when the main parachute malfunctioned and her emergency procedures were executed without enough altitude for her backup canopy to deploy.
- Jul 21 2013, a 42-year-old man (Igor Zaitsev) died in hospital after an incident resulted in a severe crash landing under an uncontrolled parachute.
- Aug 25 2002, the first year of operation at the new Baldwin Airport location, a 38-year-old man (Gareth Rodgers) died while performing his 7th student level skydive when his parachutes failed to deploy.
