= Winter City =

Winter City or Winter Cities is a concept for communities in northern latitudes that encourages them to plan their transportation systems, buildings, and recreation project around the idea of using their infrastructure during all four seasons, including winter, rather than just the other three.

== Background ==
In communities and regions where the concept of embracing winter has taken hold, it has made a dramatic impact on the lives of residents, especially in terms of improving winter livability, increasing tourism and strengthening the economy during what had been a traditional down time. The concept has been responsible for helping many communities see the opportunities that winter offers and helping many residents in the north acknowledge that winter can be an enjoyable time of year and that not everyone need move to warmer climes from November through May.

It has often been said that many communities in northern latitudes are living in denial of their northern climate. As evidence, they point to the fact that many northern cities are designed in much the same way that southern/warm-climate cities are designed.

== Livable Winter Cities Association ==
The Livable Winter Cities Association was formed in 1982 by a group of people from across North America and once had chapters in Minneapolis, Ottawa, and Anchorage. Members included cities, planners, architects, engineers, and other interested persons from around the world. From 1982 to 2005, the Association organized conferences, published books and the quarterly magazine "Winter Cities". As a non-profit managed by a dedicated but small group of volunteers, the Livable Winter Cities Association, in the end, struggled to maintain its mission. The Association mission is revived now through the efforts of the Winter Cites Institute, whose members include municipalities, community leaders and design professionals from around the world. In their 1986 publication, Livable Winter Cities, The American Institute of Architects and the Royal Architecture Institute of Canada defined winter cities as "places where the average January temperature is 32°F (0°C) or colder, and that are generally located above 45° latitude." Definitions of a what a winter city is have since changed to focus more on the concept of winter city thinking than relying on specific temperatures and geographies of a city.

Livable Winter Cities, published in 1986 in Edmonton, provides a solid context and background of the city's relationship with winter. The book emphasizes the lack of literature on the design of winter cities, and attempts to provide a comprehensive resource for winter cities, at a time when it was a relatively newer topic. It outlines the historical roots of Edmonton, claiming "northern cities in the west were built almost entirely in the twentieth century by private and public builders working on their properties, to answer their own needs". This focus on private and individualistic needs has left our city unconnected, spread out, and ill-equipped to deal with winter. Livable Winter Cities claims that most efforts in Winter Cities have centered on bringing a sense of the outdoors inside, however, there a need to extend some of the comforts of the indoors to the world of outdoor public spaces. For outdoor spaces, they suggest that outdoor spaces consider solar access, include heat islands, and essentially have a winter purpose. Along with this, inviting lighting, use of colour, and ice or snow sculpture should be included as well.

== The Winter Cities Institute ==
Northern communities or "winter cities" have great opportunities to mitigate negative effects of the winter season while reinforcing the many positive aspects to create a vibrant, sustainable and livable environment for a prosperous future. The sustainability of winter cities requires a creative approach that addresses the problems of snow and cold while enhancing the advantages, opportunities and beauty of the winter season. A positive approach benefits the attitudes of residents and bolsters the community's ability to attract new businesses and residents.

The mission of the Winter Cities Institute is to provide information, resources, policy, academic articles and design opportunities for those who desire to make northern communities more livable and sustainable. Their goal is to be the best source for information, research, reports, plans and news about winter cities from around the northern world, focusing on how to make the best of the winter season.

In 2024, the Winter Cities Institute was relocated to the University of Alberta, where it is now housed within the Winter Cities Hub in the School of Urban and Regional Planning. This transition, coordinated with the conclusion of the City of Edmonton’s 10-year Winter Strategy operational budget, marks the beginning of a new chapter. The Institute’s next phase focuses on fostering deeper collaboration with planners, architects, and designers to embed winter considerations into every aspect of urban development.

This forward-looking approach is strengthened by its integration into the University of Alberta, a renowned research institution and thriving urban laboratory. The university’s leadership in winter city innovation positions it as an ideal home for the Institute, enabling enhanced collaboration with the City of Edmonton to transform the city into a “living lab” for winter urban innovation. This partnership offers a unique opportunity to develop practical, climate-resilient solutions for cold-climate urban living, solidifying Edmonton and the University of Alberta as global leaders in winter city research and development.

The Winter Cities Institute is run by Dr. Robert Summers at the University of Alberta. Members of the WCI include Danielle Soneff as the lead project coordinator, Kristoff Van Assche as an academic contributor, Patrick Coleman as the legacy contributor, and Madeleine Stout as the City of Edmonton contributor.

== Features of a Winter City ==
Winter is often perceived as a negative force that generates inconvenience and added cost, in part due to cities and buildings planned and constructed as if they were in a southern, warmer location.

City and town planning, site design, transportation and infrastructure engineering, and architecture can all benefit through the application of "Winter City" design principles that work with nature rather than against it, in order to make winter a positive part of a four-season lifestyle. The goal is to create livability, reduce human discomfort, promote energy efficiency and the economic sustainability of northern places.

== European Winter Cities ==
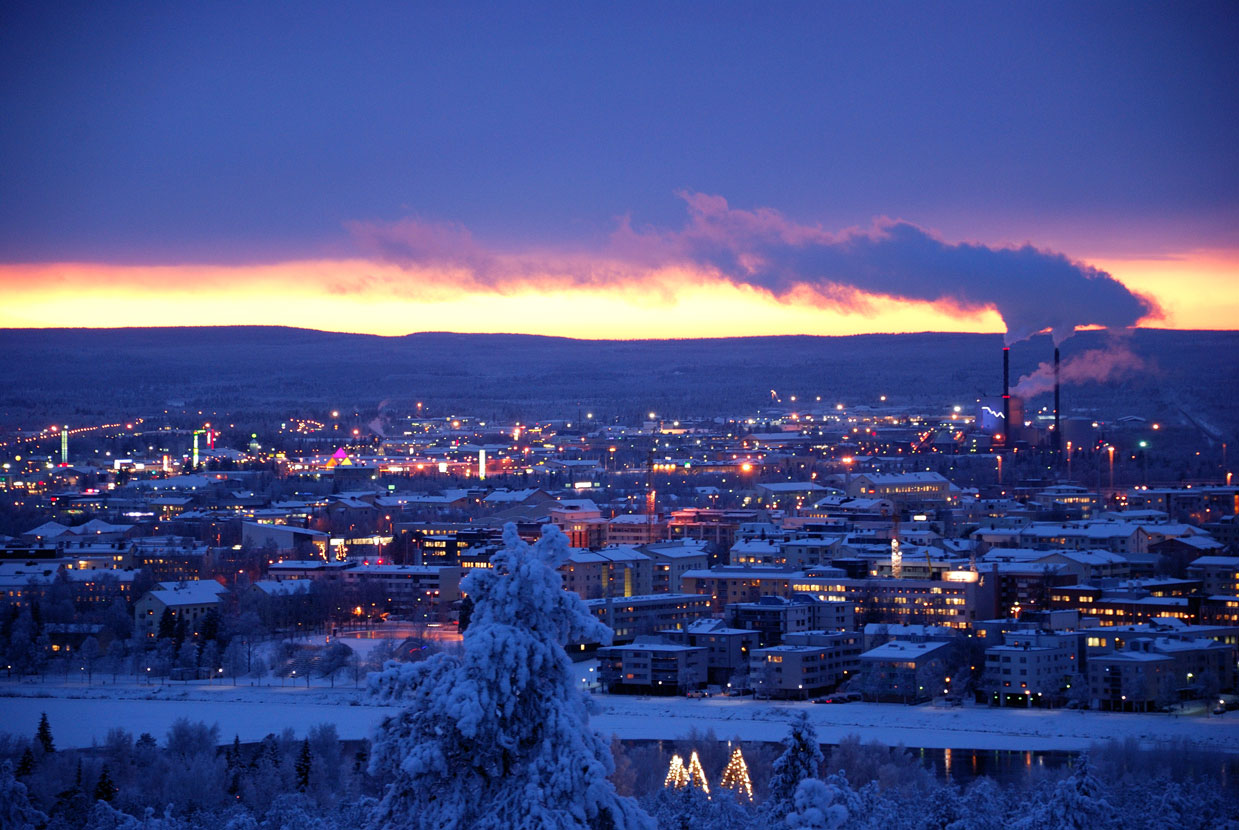
Rovaniemi, the capital of Finnish Lapland, during winter.

From 2010 to 2020, Luleå University of Technology's Architecture Group focused on research into Swedish winter cities. Luleå City was an original member of the Winter Cities Association. Under the direction of Kristina L Nilsson, architect SAR/ MSA, Professor emerita of Architecture, Member of the Royal Academy of Engineering, Board member of the National Renovation Center and Swedish representative in the Nordic Planning Research Network PLANNORD, this led to a number of key projects and PhD theses.

1. Urban design of winter cities: Winter season connectivity for soft mobility
2. Heritagisation, re-heritagisation and de-heritagisation of built environments: The urban transformation of Kiruna, Sweden
3. Outdoor Comfort in Cold Climates: Integrating Microclimate Factors in Urban Design
4. Attractiveness in Urban Design: A study of the production of attractive places

The full list of resulting studies, documents and articles can be found here

Major projects connected to this research include the moving of the Arctic City, Kiruna. The planning and urban design of Kiruna have historically acknowledged the winter context, however in the ongoing urban transformation best practice in winter planning considering the mikroclimate has been neglected.

To progress this line of inquiry, the group has strong links with the University of the Arctic (UArctic) and the Architect Five, a forum for collaboration of the five universities in the northern Fennoscandian region: University of Oulu, University of Lapland, Luleå University of Technology, UiT -The Arctic University of Norway, and Umeå University

Overarching considerations in this work encompass current planning agenda's of human health and well-being, climate change, global warming, urban heritage and place attractiveness. For urban design in particular the work expands the notion of green/ blue infrastructure planning to 'WHITE, GREEN, BLUE' - to encompass the winter season.

Historically important Architects and Planners include Ralph Erskine and Anne Brit Børve.

Cities and towns actively planning and designing for winter use include:

- Gällivare, Sweden
- Kiruna, Sweden
- Luleå, Sweden
- Oulu, Finland
- Svappavaara, Sweden
- Tromsø, Norway

== Winter City Edmonton ==
In 2013 the city of Edmonton approved the WinterCity Strategy. This strategy has four pillars of focus– Winter Life, Winter Design, Winter Economy, and Our Winter Story. In 2016, the City released the Winter City Design Guidelines, a document that outlines how to best equip our city to thrive and function in the winter months. The guidelines cover many areas of design— streets, architecture, infrastructure, vegetation, public art, way finding, transit, and more. The guidelines offer five main principles of design for a winter city.

1. Incorporate strategies to block wind, particular prevailing winds and downdrafts
2. Maximize sun exposure through orientation and design
3. Use of colour to enliven the winterscape
4. Create visual interest with light, while being mindful of intensity, spread, contrast, and colour
5. Design and provide infrastructure that supports desired winter life and improves comfort and access in cold weather

Sun and wind exposure is a major area of consideration when thinking about urban design. For urban areas, taller buildings should be located on the north side of streets to avoid shadow casting over sidewalks and outdoor spaces. Along with these building considerations, side to side building heights should be varied by one- to two-storeys to reduce wind speeds. At the base of these buildings, compact, fine-grained developments create a more inviting and walkable area. Fine-grained is defined in these guidelines by "small blocks, narrow frontages, and frequent storefronts". For outdoor parks and streets, vegetation near roads must be able to withstand salt, sand, and gravel. Plant material along sidewalks or parking lots should be set back to allow for space for snow storage, and raised plant beds can protect damage from both snow clearing and grass cutting equipment. Deciduous trees are a great choice for south facing areas, as they allow sun to reach the ground during the winter months while providing shade in the warmer summer months. The guidelines also outline tips for lightning. Feature lighting is a great way to create an inviting atmosphere in the dim months, providing visual interest, landmarks, and a sense of safety. The city recommends that lighting face downward to reduce light pollution.
