= Tourism in Toronto =

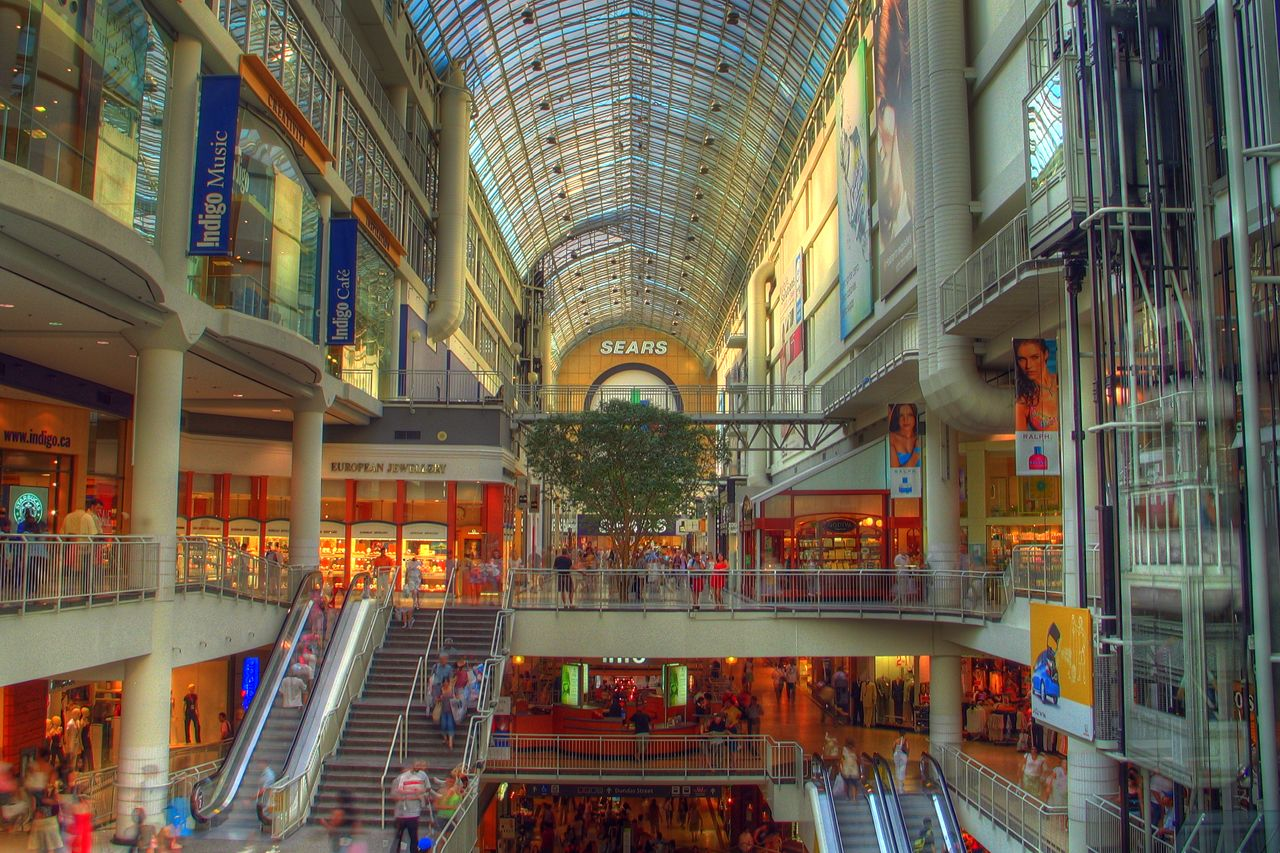
The Toronto Eaton Centre is the most visited tourist attraction in Toronto.

Toronto is one of Canada's leading tourism destinations. In 2017, the Toronto area received 43.7 million tourists, of which 10.4 million were domestic visitors and 2.97 million were from the United States, spending a total of $8.84 billion. Toronto has an array of tourist attractions and a rich cultural life.

== Attractions ==
=== Museums ===
The city of Toronto consists of many unique and famous museums. The Royal Ontario Museum is Canada's largest museum of natural history and world cultures. It presents a variety of art, archaeology and natural science from around the world. The Art Gallery of Ontario (AGO) is one of the largest art museums in North America and is home to approximately 95,000 works from around the world. The Bata Shoe Museum consists of many kinds of footwear from around the world. The Hockey Hall of Fame is amongst the largest ice hockey museums in the world, and home to several important artifacts, including the Stanley Cup. Other museums include the Aga Khan Museum, Gardiner Museum of Ceramic Art, Ukraine Museum of Canada, Toronto Police Museum and Discovery Centre, Textile Museum of Canada, the Museum of Inuit Art, Oral History Museum and many others.

=== Zoos and Aquarium ===
The Toronto Zoo is Canada's largest zoo and is home to over 5,000 animals, which represent about 500 different species. The High Park Zoo is also located in Toronto, comprising 399 acres of land that is home to animals including peacocks, deer, sheep and others. More than 250,000 people visit the High Park Zoo every year. Ripley's Aquarium of Canada is Canada's largest indoor aquarium, consisting of 5.7 million litres of water, representing marine and freshwater habitats from all around the world.

=== CN Tower ===
The CN Tower is visited by approximately 2 million people every year. In 1995, the CN Tower was classified as one of the Seven Wonders of the Modern World by the American Society of Civil Engineers, and for more than 30 years it was the world's tallest free-standing structure. The CN Tower consists of many inner attractions like the Glass Floor, SkyPod, 360 restaurant and EdgeWalk. EdgeWalk is a full circle hands-free walk on a 5 feet wide ledge encircling the top of the Tower, which is 1,168 feet aboveground. It has also been mentioned in the Guinness Book of World Records for the highest external walk on a building. The CN Tower provides various services for individuals with disabilities and special needs.

=== St. Lawrence Market ===
The St. Lawrence Market is a major public market, located along Front Street and Jarvis Street in the neighborhood of the same name, St. Lawrence. To the south of the market, over The Esplande, lies the St. Lawrence Market South, the southern half of the building. The St. Lawrence Market was first established in 1803, later being replaced in 1814, from henceforth being used as both a public market and post office before burning down in the Great Fire of 1849. It was then replaced, with the modern St. Lawrence north building being built on the site. The new St. Lawrence market had two floors, with the bottom floor as a market and the upper floor as Toronto's new city hall, designed by E.J Lennox, only replaced in 1899 where city officials moved to what is now called today as Old City Hall. The market today features more than 100 vendors, in addition to once being named, by National Geographic, the world's best food market.
