= List of multicultural media in the Greater Toronto Area =

This is a list of multicultural mass media in the Greater Toronto Area.

Media Company	Type	Community
Canada KCR News Corp.	Print	Korean
The Canadian Parvasi	Online & Print	South Asian
Parvasi Radio	Radio	South Asian
Parvasi TV	TV	South Asian
Parvasi Weekly	Online & Print	South Asian
Sing Tao A1 Chinese Radio	Radio	Chinese
All TV	TV	Korean
Bits Magazine	Print	Japanese
Canada Authayan	Print	Tamil
Canadian City Post	Print	Chinese
Canadian Immigrant Magazine	Print	Multicultural
CanIndia News	Print	South Asian
Ears Online	Web	Chinese and English
Ethnic Channels Group	TV	Chinese
Fairchild Radio	Radio	Chinese
Fairchild TV	TV	Chinese
Filmicafe Media Inc.	Web	South Asian
Gazeta	Print	Polish
GTA South Asian Media Network Inc.	Online, Print & Radio	English Multicultural
Immigrant Newsline	Print	South Asian
iTalkBB Media Corp.	TV	Chinese
Korea Canada Central Daily (JoongAng Ilbo)	Print	Korean
Korea Times Daily (Hankook Ilbo)	Print	Korean
Living Plus	Print	Korean
Ming Pao Daily	Print	Chinese
Megafone Media Corp.	Online	Chinese
Omni Television	TV	Chinese
Philippine Reporter	Print	Philippines
Msimulizionline	Print & Enewspaper	East African/Swahili/English
Russian Guide	Print	Russian
Sing Tao Daily	Print	Chinese
Thoi Bao	Print	Vietnamese
The Weekender	Print	South Asian
The Weekly Voice	Print	South Asian
The Toronto Caribbean Newspaper	Print	Caribbean
TorontoTamil	Online & Video	Tamil & English
World Journal	Print	Chinese
WowTV	TV	Chinese
Rupane TV	Online, Video Magazine	Sri Lankan (Sinhalese)
