= List of filming locations in Toronto =

Toronto, Ontario, Canada has a significant film and television production industry, which has earned it the nickname "Hollywood North", alongside Vancouver, British Columbia. In addition to features that take place in Toronto, it often serves as a substitute location for other cities and areas including Chicago and New York City.

== Neighbourhoods ==
=== Cabbagetown ===
- Big Fat Greek Wedding
- Serendipity (film)

== Buildings ==
=== Casa Loma ===
- X-Men
- X2
- Scott Pilgrim vs. the World

=== Fairmont Royal York ===
- Cinderella Man

=== Toronto City Hall ===
- Resident Evil: Apocalypse
- Star Trek: The Next Generation
- The Sentinel

=== Toronto Reference Library ===
- Red (also Chicago, Illinois and New York City, New York)

=== University of Toronto St. George ===
- Mean Girls
- Chicago
- Capote
- Man of the Year
- Skulls
- Hannibal (TV series)
- Nikita (TV series)
- Orphan Black
- The Incredible Hulk (film)
- Urban Legend (film)
- Harold and Kumar Go To White Castle (2004 film)
- The Boondock Saints (1999 film)
- Designated Survivor
- Suits
- Mrs. America
- Salvation

=== University of Toronto Scarborough ===
- Total Recall
- Shadowhunters

== Parks ==
=== Morningside Park ===
- The Incredible Hulk

=== Allan Gardens ===
- Warehouse 13
- Rookie Blue

=== Guild Park and Gardens ===
- The Skulls (film)

== Streets ==
=== Church Street ===
- Kojak
- The Grid
- Queer As Folk (US)
- Saving Hope

=== Kingston Road ===
- Kick-Ass

=== Yonge Street ===
- Confessions of a Teenage Drama Queen
- Queer as Folk (US)
- Suicide Squad

=== Elizabeth Street ===
- Pacific Rim (film)

== Studios ==
=== District 28 ===
- [[Formerly: Hangloose Media]]
