= Brickfête =

LEGO fan convention in Canada

- Status: Active
- Genre: LEGO
- Venue: Various
- Location: Toronto area
- Country: Canada
- Inaugurated: 2011
- Organizer: Ontario Brick Builders
- Website: www.brickfete.com

Brickfête is a LEGO fan convention held annually in Toronto, Ontario, Canada. It became the first Canadian LEGO convention for adult fans of LEGO at its inaugural event in 2011. It was created by volunteers and organized by the Ontario Brick Builders (OBB). The main focus of the convention is for LEGO fans and hobbyists bring their creations to display and share with fellow enthusiasts. Brickfête's mandate is to offer any fan, regardless of skill level or size of collection, a place to display their creations and to promote their revered hobby to new potential fans. Like other fan conventions, it offers workshops, presentations, special events, contests and challenges.

Brickfête is a four-day event typically held on a Thursday through Sunday. Brickfête is held typically in July in Toronto. In its third year, Brickfête also created a travelling road show (Brickfête - On the Road), which takes a similar, yet smaller show throughout Canada. Its first destination was Montreal, Quebec.

Brickfête is a two part event with a private convention for (primarily adult) exhibitors and then a public exhibition (general public) on the weekend. The event is not sponsored by the LEGO Company however it is recognized as a fan event by them.

== Private convention ==
The main focus of the event is the private convention, which provides a venue for adult fans of LEGO to bring and display their own LEGO creations. Activities at the convention include presentations, seminars, guest speakers, raffles, games, contests and awards. The LEGO company will sometimes provides designers or representatives as guest speakers or to show sneak peek previews of upcoming sets. The full attendee receives an event package including a schedule of events, give-aways from vendors, souvenirs of the event including an event brick, and other exclusive material.

== Public exhibition ==
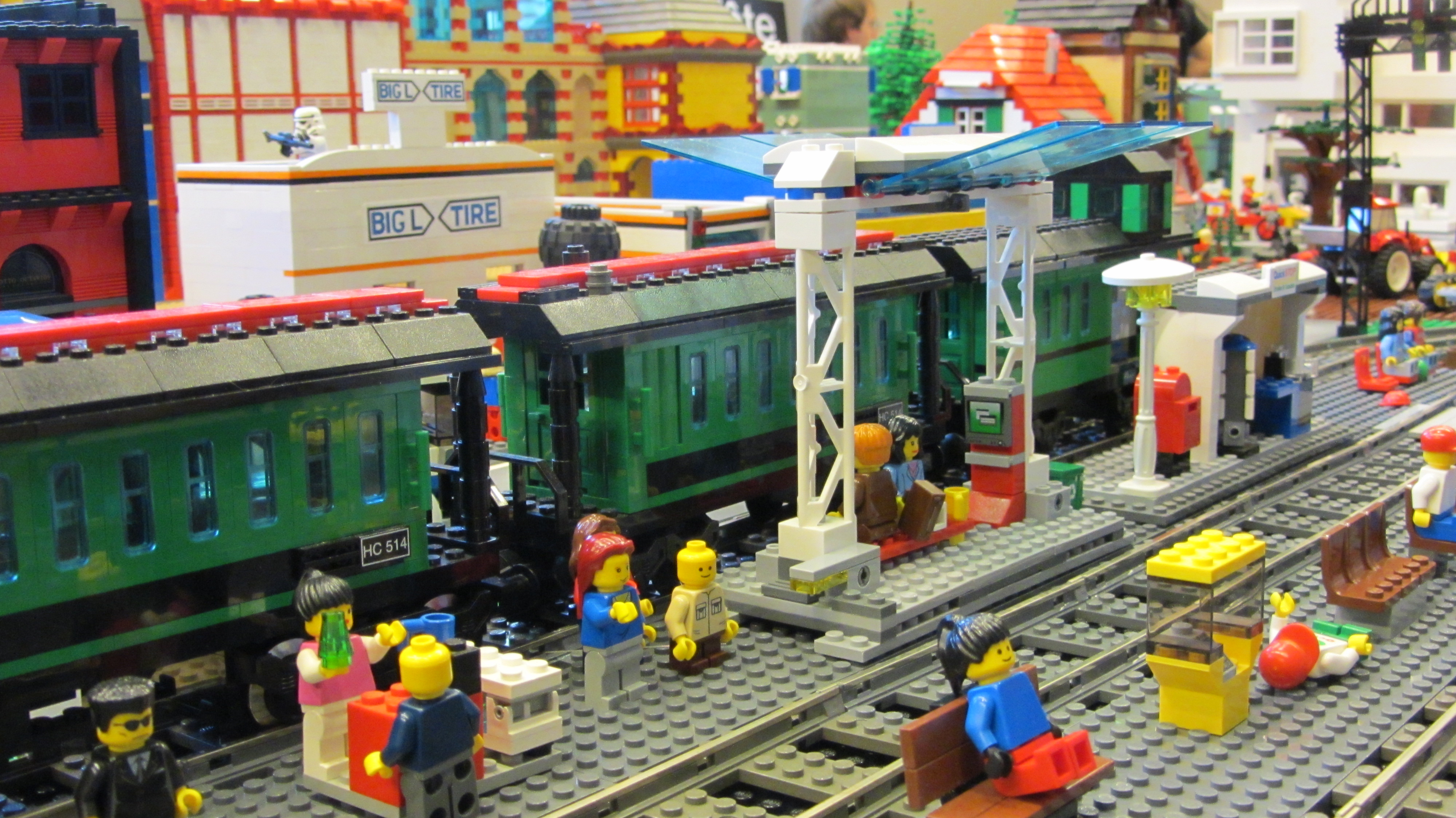
A model train station at the inaugural 2011 event

The public exhibition is for LEGO fans of all ages. For a nominal fee, the general public can view of hobbyist-built creations, meet and ask questions of their creators, or expand their interest in building or collecting LEGO. Guest can expect to see custom creations that include but are not limited to LEGO Robots & Mindstorms creations, city layouts with powered trains, space, Star Wars & science fiction creations, art, architecture and design, planes, trains and automobiles, historical buildings and castles, pirates, steampunk and Vikings, and mosaics and sculptures. There is a build area for hands-on experimenting.

== Locations and dates ==
Dates	Location	Organizer	Host Lug	AFOL & VIP Attendees	Theme	Guest Speakers	Notes
July 28–31, 2011	Assembly Hall, Toronto	OBB	rtlToronto	78 & 3	Old School	Jim Foulds	First Brickfête event
July 12–15, 2012	Hilton Hotel, Toronto	OBB	WHaCKoLUG	106 & 70	Heroes	Kevin Hinkle	Moved to a larger venue, Star Wars characters entertained
July 11–14, 2013	Hilton Hotel, Toronto	OBB	rtlToronto	122 & 78	Canadian Inventions & Inventors	Kevin Hinkle, Pierre Normandin, Graeme Dymond	Life-size LEGO figure entertained, Duplo play area for children under 3 was added
Nov 21–24, 2013	Montreal	OBB	QueLUG	86 & 80	Construction	Kevin Hinkle	First "On the Road" show
July 17–20, 2014	Delta East, Toronto	OBB	WHaCKoLUG	N/A	Elements	Jamie Berard, Kevin Hinkle	Venue change for better location and free public parking
July 3–5, 2015	Delta East, Toronto	OBB	WHaCKoLUG	N/A	Fire	unknown	
July 7–10, 2016	Delta East, Toronto	OBB	WHaCKoLUG	N/A	Music	unknown	
July 8–9, 2017	Delta East, Toronto	OBB	WHaCKoLUG	N/A	Canadian	unknown	

== Press Coverage ==
680 News Etobicoke Guardian
