= Vancouver Film and Television Forum =

Film festival in British Columbia

The Vancouver Film and Television Forum appears to have been an annual event produced by the Vancouver International Film Festival in Vancouver, British Columbia, Canada. Running for at least 28 years, the Film and Television Forum seems to have last taken place at the Rogers Industry Centre located at the Vancouver International Film Centre from October 2–4, 2013 with New Filmmakers' Day (NFD) on October 5. A positive write-up of the festivities was posted on the film festival website at the time, but years later a link to the same URL returns a Page Not Found message.

== Overview ==
The Forum is a four-day event that features panel discussions, master classes, workshops, and meetings geared to the professional development of the Canadian film and television community. It also serves as a platform for delegates to access domestic and global market leaders, share the expertise of international speakers and meet and foster working relationships with their peers.

Program content includes discussions ranging from the issue of multiplatform production and digital distribution to finding elusive co-production partners. Each day focuses on a different aspect of the industry, with themes including documentaries, factual programming, films, television and "new filmmakers". Speakers focus on successful and critically acclaimed film and television productions. Guest speakers have included Marc Forster, Atom Egoyan, Peter Farrelly, Sarah Polley, Stan Lee, Conrad Hall, Doug Liman, Michael Moore, Alexander Payne, Gus Van Sant and Joel H. Cohen.

== See also ==
- Vancouver International Film Festival
