= List of Asian events in Toronto =

Toronto is recognized as one of the most diverse and multicultural cities in the world. The population of Asian descent is over 1 million in the GTA, roughly 20% of the total population. With this many Asians living in the GTA, there are numerous cultural events and festivals throughout the year.

Events	Community	Dates	Location
Lunar New Year Festival	Chinese/Vietnamese/Korean	Januaryor February	varies
Dragon Ball	Chinese	January or February	Metro Toronto Convention Centre
South Asian Alliance Culture Show	South Asian	March	Varies
Haru Matsuri (Japanese Spring Festival)	Japanese	March	Japanese Canadian Cultural Centre
Korean-Canadian Scholarship Foundation (Toronto) Gala	Korean	March	Varies
Sinhalese New Year Festival "Celebration of Sri Lankan Solidarity"	Sri Lankan	April	Varies
Cambodian (Khmer) New Year Festival	Cambodian(Khmer)	April	Varies
Federation of Chinese Canadian Professionals (Ontario) Gala	Chinese	May	Varies
Carlos Bulosan Theatre's Tales from the Flipside Festival	Multicultural (mostly Filipino)	May	Toronto
Beauties of Asia Pageant	Multicultural (mostly Chinese)	May or June	Varies
Asian Community Games	Multicultural (mostly Chinese)	June	York University Campus
Taste of Asia	Multicultural (mostly Chinese)	June	Kennedy Road and Steeles Avenue
Toronto International Dragon Boat Race Festival	Multicultural Japanese Canadian Cultural Centre	June	Toronto Centre Island
Dano Festival	Korean	June	Christie Pits
Festival of India (Ratha-Yatra)	Indian	July	Centre Island
Taste of Thailand Festival	Thai	July	Nathan Phillips Square
Waterfront Night Market	Multicultural (mostly Chinese/Japanese)	July	Kontained by the Pier
Mississauga Chinese Arts Festival	Chinese	July or August	Mississauga Living Arts Centre
Festival of South Asia (Little India Street Festival)	Southasian	July or August	Gerrard Street East
Toronto Chinatown Festival	Chinese	August	Chinatown
Miss Pakistan World	Pakistani	August	Varies
Federation of Chinese Canadian Professionals (Ontario) Golf Tournament	Chinese	August	Varies
Miss India Canada Pageant	South Asian	August	Double Tree by Hilton
Hangawi Festival	Korean	September	Mel Lastman Square
Diwali Fiesta	Southasian	October	Pearson Convention Centre
Mississauga Board of Chinese Professionals and Businesses	Chinese	October	Varies
Diwali-Mela	South Asian	November	Gerrard Indian Bazaar
Miss Chinese Toronto Pageant	Chinese	November	Metro Toronto Convention Centre
Road to Asia Festival	Multicultural	November	Japanese Canadian Cultural Centre
