= Taste of the Kingsway =

Annual street festival in Toronto, Canada

- Date(s): September 8–10, 2023
- Location(s): Bloor Street West, Toronto

The Taste of the Kingsway is an annual street festival held in Toronto, Ontario. The festival takes place on Bloor Street West between the intersections of Prince Edward Drive and Montgomery Road. Held on the second weekend of September, Taste of the Kingsway is the Kingsway neighbourhood's largest festival of the year.

Hosted by the Kingsway BIA, an organization formed in 1979 aiming to promote the Kingsway area, the Taste of the Kingsway has grown from a small celebration of local food in 1998 to a large community event attracting over 200,000 visitors in 2010.

== Main attractions ==
The Taste of the Kingsway offers live music, a wide variety of food, amusement rides, street performers, and carnival games. The festival also raises money for charity and hosts the largest dog show in Etobicoke.
