= Public services in Toronto =

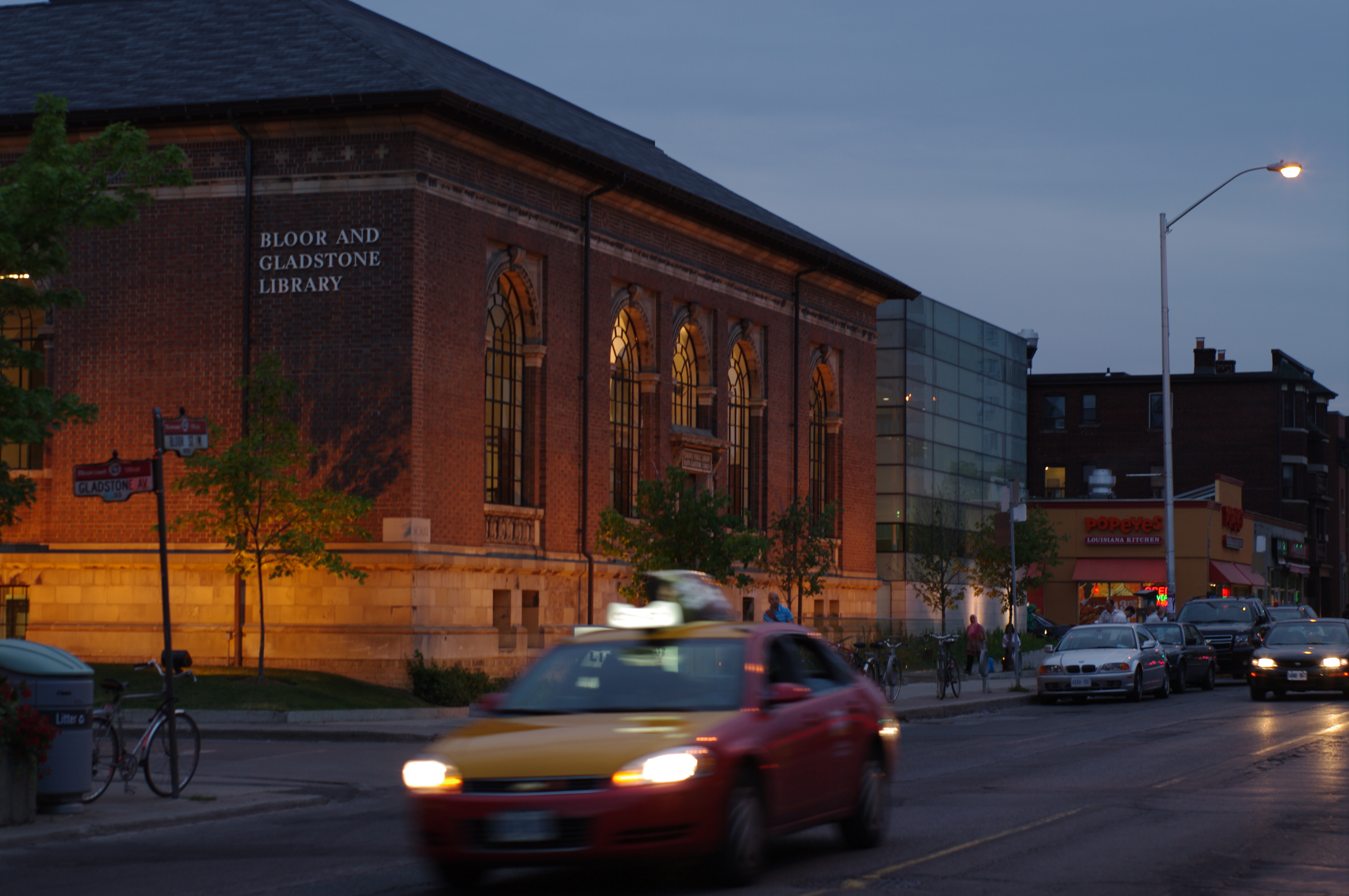
The Bloor and Gladstone branch of the Toronto Public Library, a public service operated by the City of Toronto government.

Public services in Toronto are funded by municipal property taxes, financial transfers from the Government of Ontario and Government of Canada, or are operated and financed by the higher-level governments. Funding for services provided by the municipal government is determined by a vote of the Toronto City Council in favour of the year's proposed operating budget.

== Operational finances ==
Revenue sources for the city's operational budget consist of transfers and subsidies from the provincial and federal governments ($1.944 B), user fees ($1.205 B) and withdrawals from the reserve fund ($0.5 B). Property taxes represent 42% of the budget ($3.221 B), which is referred to as the Net Operating Budget. All other sources total approximately $1.0 B.

The most significant expenditures are:

- Police Services Board (24.4% of expenditures)
- Debt financing (12.2%)
- Fire services (10.4%)
- Social services (8.4%)
- Shelter, Support and Housing Administration (8.0%)
- Toronto Transit Commission (includes WheelTrans service) (7.4%)
- Parks, Forestry and Recreation (7.0%)
- Transportation services (5.7%)
- Solid Waste Management services (5.7%)
- Toronto Public Library (4.6%)

All other services individually represent less than 2% of expenditures.

== Education ==
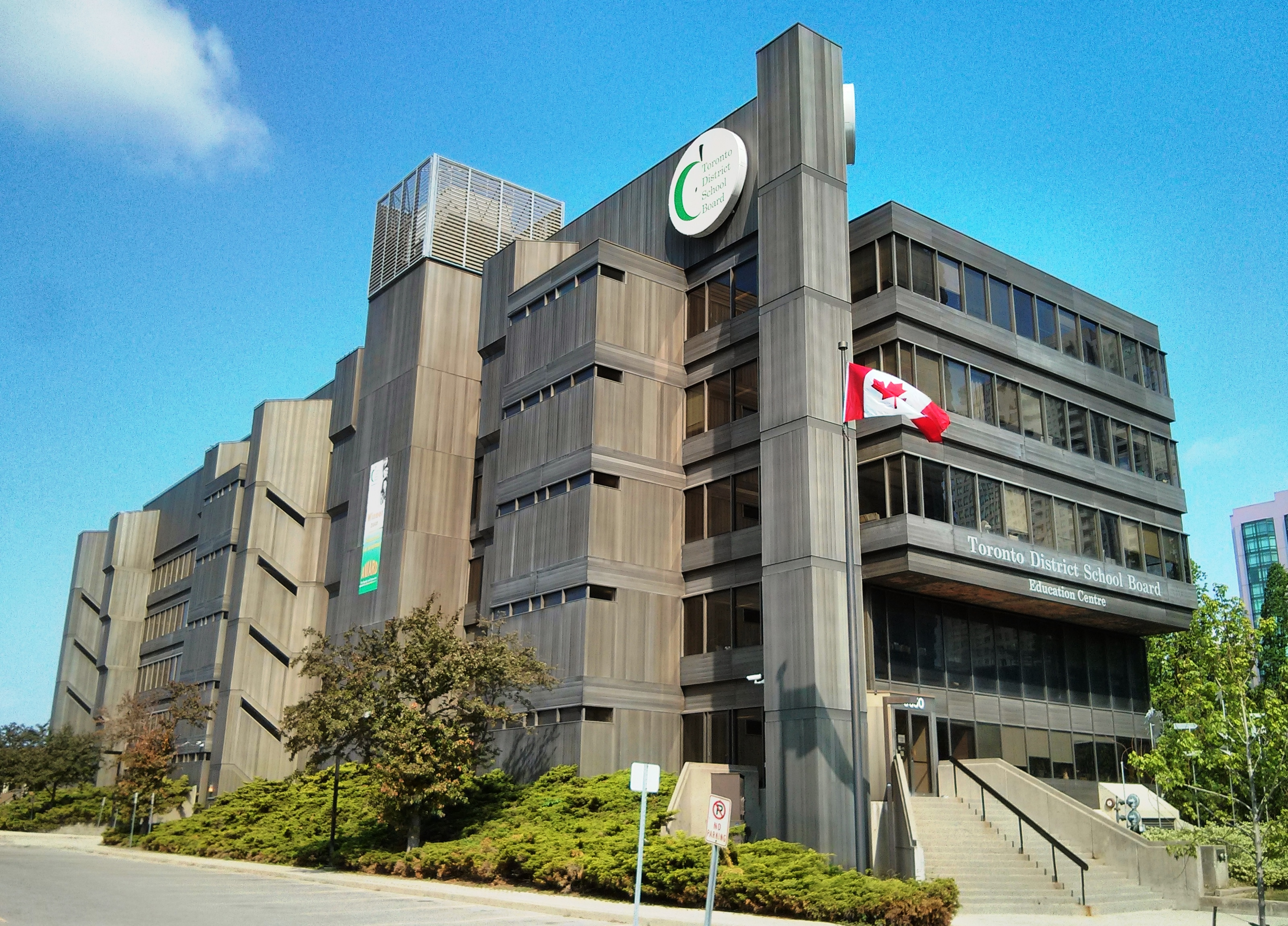
Head office for the Toronto District School Board, one of four public school boards that operate in the city.

Most students from Toronto receive their primary and secondary education via the public school system, operated by school boards funded by the province via provincial income tax and federal financial transfers to the provincial government. The Toronto District School Board (TDSB) is a public secular English-first language school board. TDSB is the city's largest public school board in the country, operating 451 public schools and 102 secondary or high schools. Other public school boards in Toronto include the Toronto Catholic District School Board (TCDSB), a separate English-first language school board; Conseil scolaire Viamonde (CSV), a secular French-first language school board; and Conseil scolaire catholique MonAvenir, a separate French-first language school board. In addition to schools operated by public school boards, the city is also home to a number of private schools.

There are five diploma-granting community colleges in Toronto: Seneca College, Humber College, Centennial College, Sheridan College and George Brown College. The Royal Conservatory of Music, which includes The Glenn Gould School, is a major music school located in downtown. The Canadian Film Centre is a film, television and new media training institute founded by filmmaker Norman Jewison.

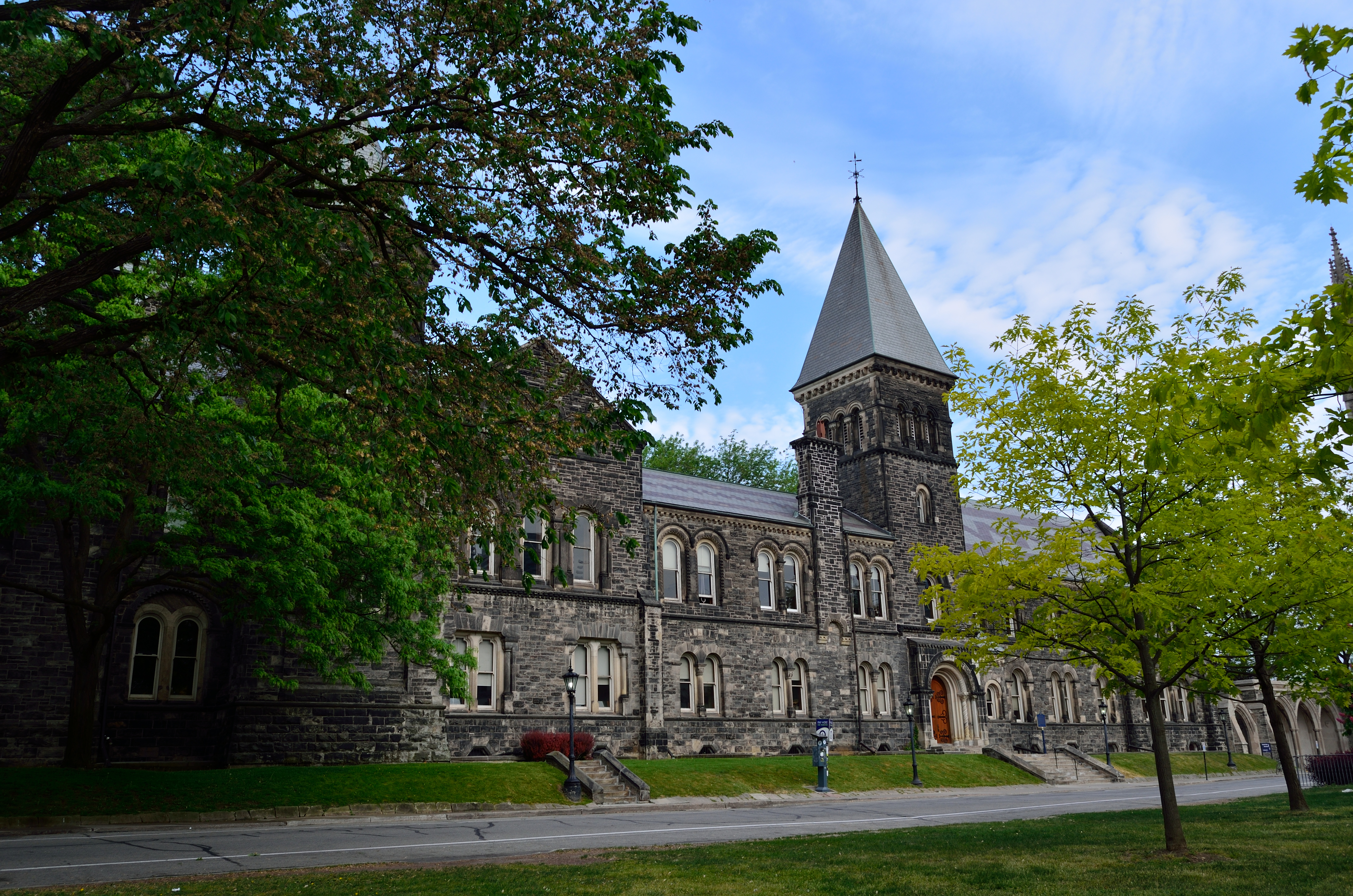
The University of Toronto is a public research university situated in the city.

The University of Toronto, established in 1827, is a leading public research institution and a worldwide leader in biomedical research. York University, is another public university located in Toronto, houses the largest law library in the Commonwealth of Nations. Other public universities located in Toronto include OCAD University, Toronto Metropolitan University, and the University of Guelph-Humber. The latter institution was established between the University of Guelph and Humber College. Humber College is a local college based in Toronto, with the University of Guelph located within the Golden Horseshoe.

The city operates an extensive library network. The Toronto Public Library is the largest public library system in Canada and the second busiest (by number of visits) in the world after the Hong Kong Public Libraries.

== Emergency services ==
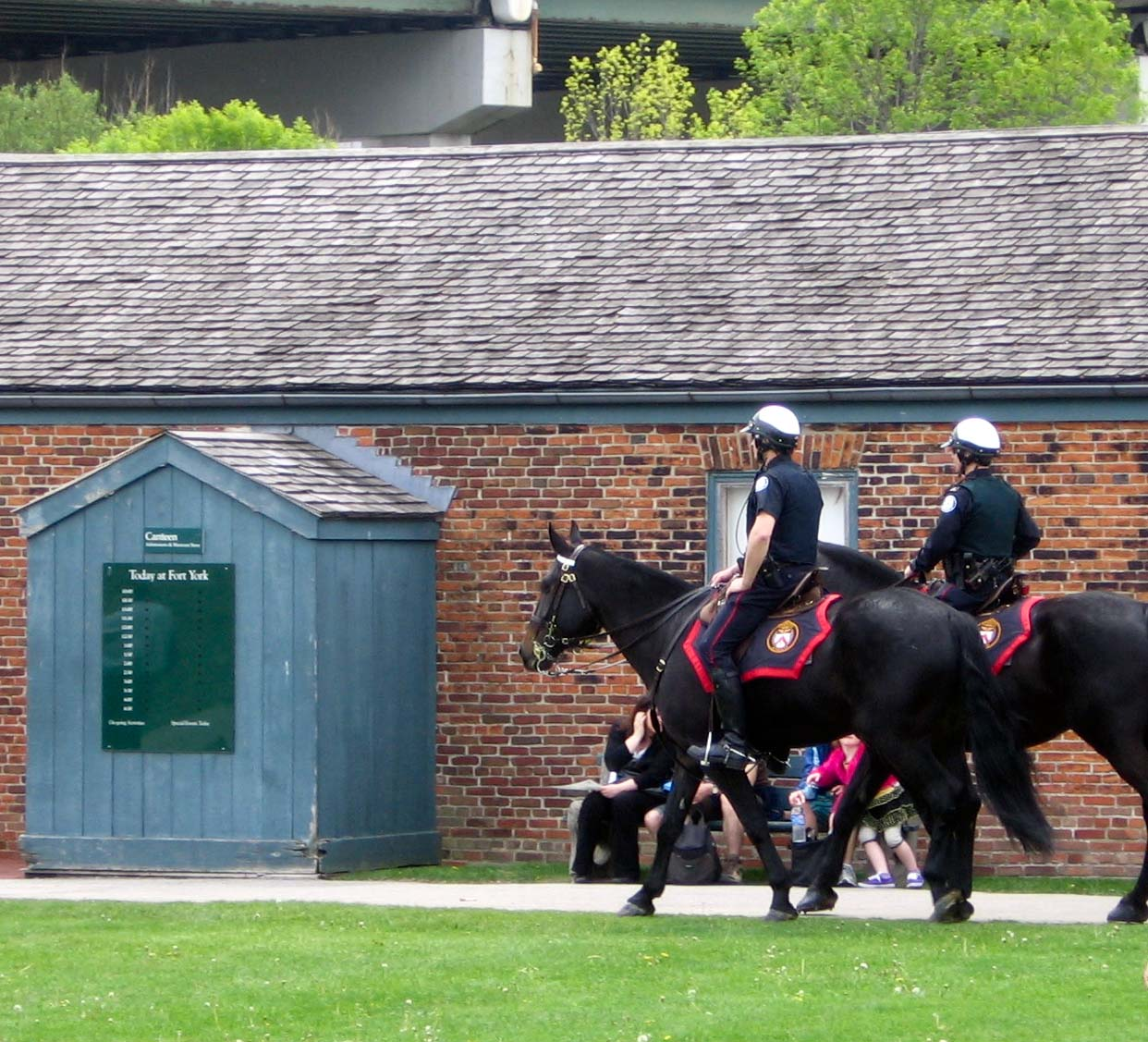
Mounted officers of the Toronto Police Service, one of three emergency service providers operated by the municipal government.

Emergency services in the city include the Toronto Fire Services, and the Toronto Paramedic Services. Toronto Fire Services provides fire protection and first-response emergency medical assistance, the Toronto Paramedic Services provides emergency medical services. The Toronto Fire Services, in collaboration with the Toronto Paramedic Services, and the Toronto Police Service, also operates the Heavy Urban Search and Rescue unit, an urban search and rescue response team.

=== Law enforcement ===
The Toronto Police Service is one of the oldest English-language modern municipal police departments in the world. The law enforcement agency is funded by the municipal government, and represents the second-greatest yearly expenditure in the city's operating budget, after public transit services.

== Health ==
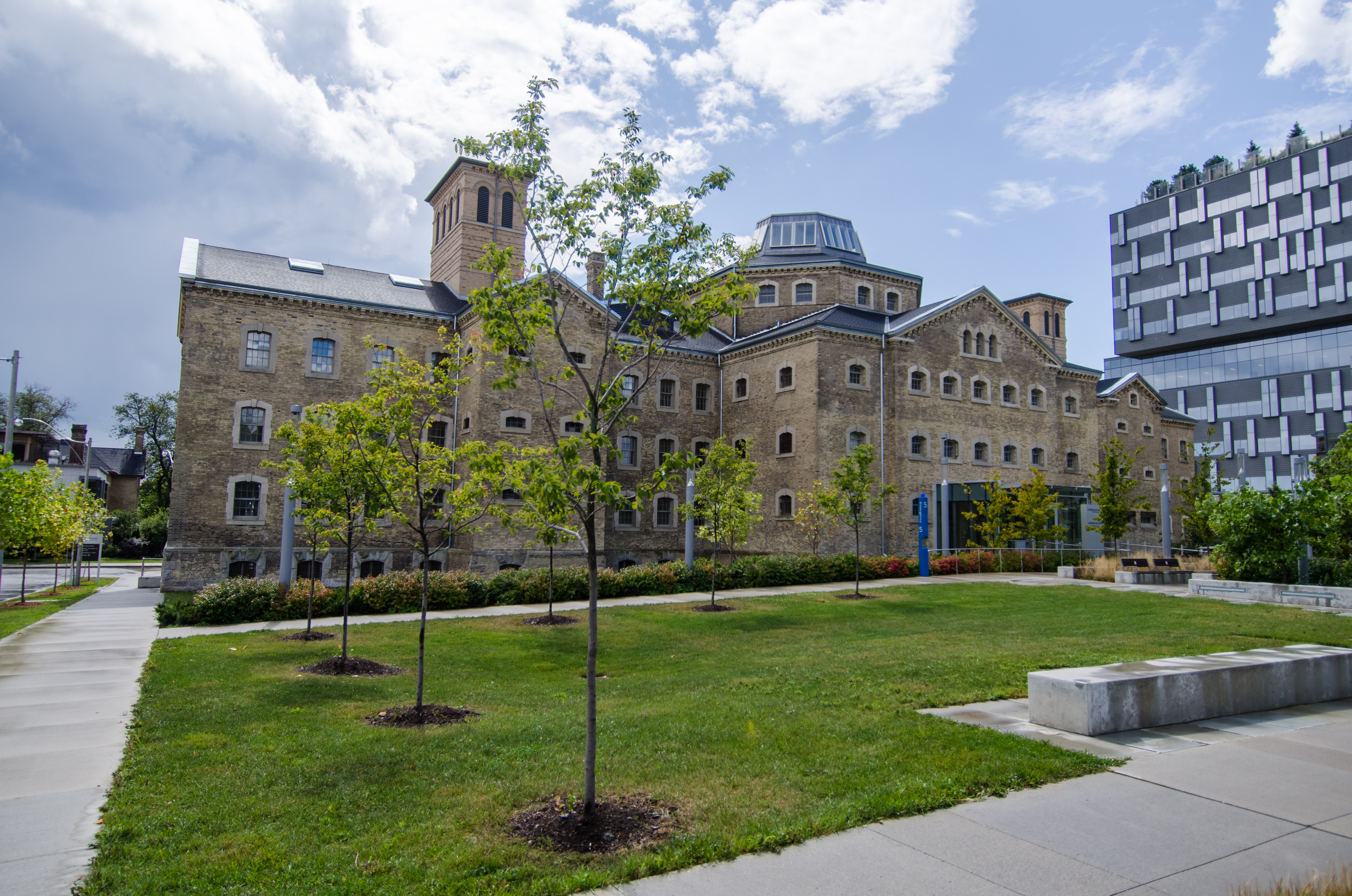
Bridgepoint Active Healthcare is a hospital located in Toronto.

Health services in Toronto are quite extensive, and benefit from the intensive and broad medical research conducted in the city. Hospitals are publicly financed, primarily by the provincial government, but also via federal government transfers to the province, some private sources (e.g. lotteries) and through charitable and philanthropic donations.

Family doctors have private practices funded by the provincial government. Paramedic and ambulatory services are funded by the city. Also, non-profit palliative care services exist.

== Recreation ==
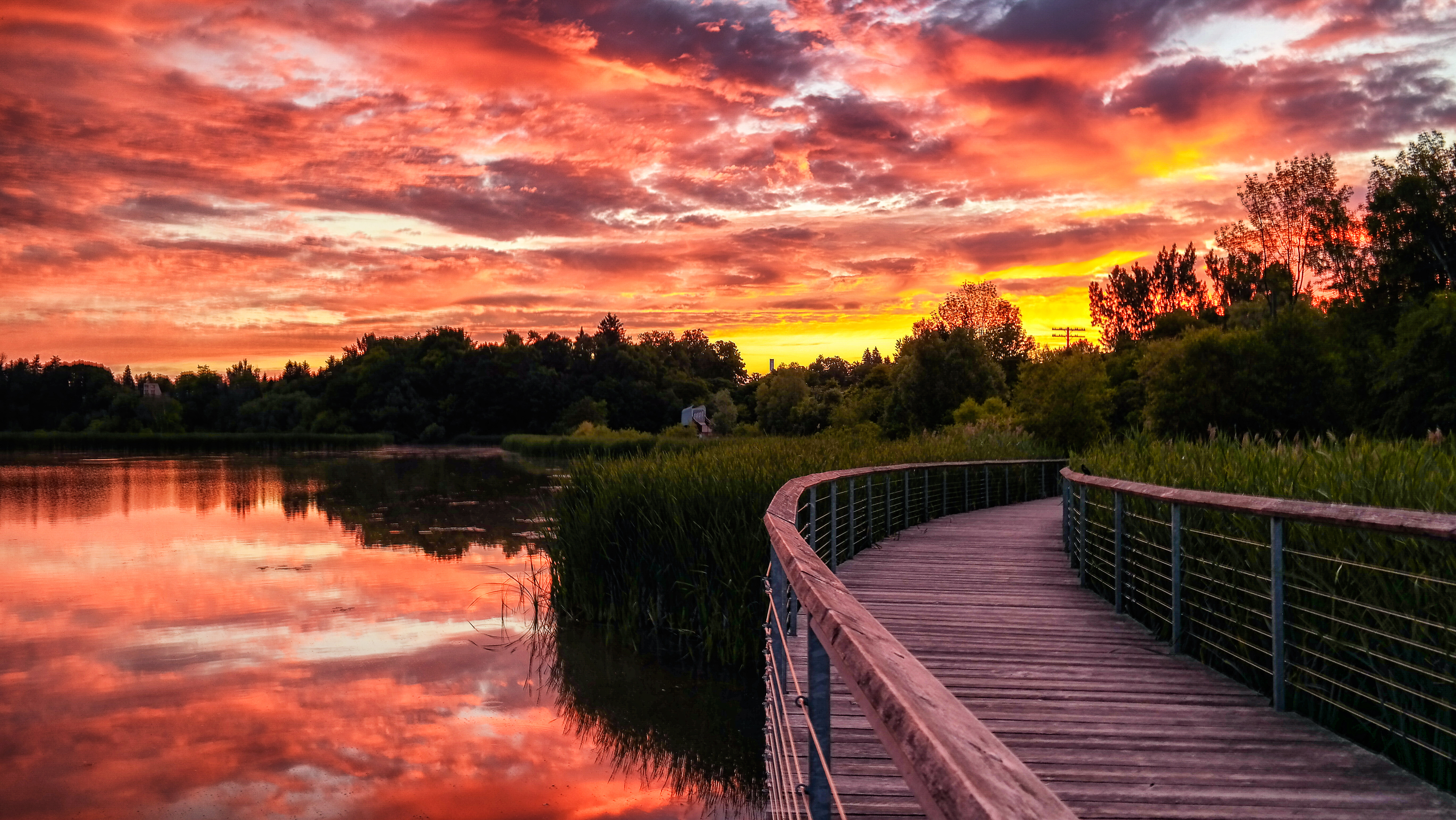
The Rouge National Urban Park is a national urban park in Toronto.

There are numerous recreation areas owned and operated by the city, including bicycle and jogging trails, community centres, public squares and urban parks. Many of these facilities are operated by the Toronto Parks, Forestry and Recreation Division. It also operates the Toronto Zoo and other public spaces, such as Nathan Phillips Square.

In addition to parks operated by the municipal government, several parks located in Toronto are operated by the provincial, and federal governments. Federally-managed parks include Rouge National Urban Park, a national urban park managed by Parks Canada.

== Transportation ==
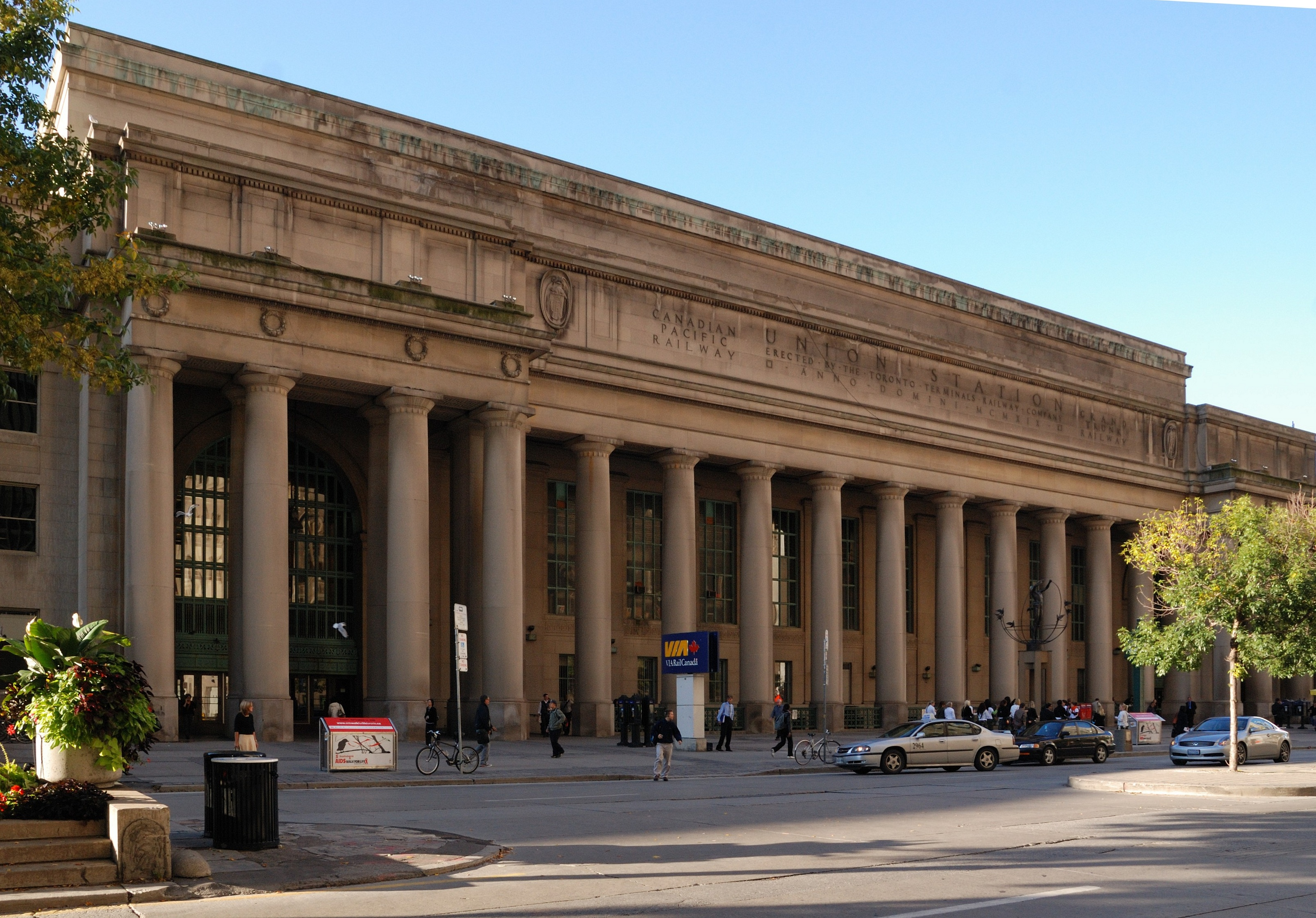
Union Station is an intermodal transportation hub in Toronto.

Various modes of transportation are available in the city. Roads within the city are a municipal responsibility, but major highways, such as the 400-series highways, are provincially funded and operated. In the winter, the city provides snow removal services on its roads and on property it owns, such as parking lots at libraries and swimming pools.

The Toronto Transit Commission is the main public transit service provider for the city. Operation of the TTC is funded by the municipal government and user receipts, but infrastructure projects may receive funding from provincial and federal sources. In addition to the TTC, other public transportation services that operate in Toronto includes GO Transit. GO Transit is a regional public transit operator managed by Metrolinx, a Crown agency of the Government of Ontario. Union Station is an intermodal transportation hub located in Downtown Toronto. The station provides access to several transportation services, including GO Transit, and the TTC.

== Waste management ==
Residential waste collection is collected by private contractors west of Yonge St., and by City of Toronto staff east of Yonge St. Waste collection was outsourced first in Etobicoke prior to the city's amalgamation, and then extended to include the area between Etobicoke and Yonge St. in 2012. There was a proposal to tender similar services east of Yonge that was studied in 2015, then revisited in 2017 before being dropped due to lack of support at city council. Some businesses make separate arrangements for their waste, as do hospitals for some of their waste. Collection includes garbage, recyclable materials, and compostable materials. Hazardous waste is also handled separately.

The city collects organics such as residential and commercial food waste through the green bin program. The organic waste is processed at two anaerobic digestors located at Disco and Dufferin Solid Waste Management Facilities. The city plans to upgrade the biogas produced by the digestors to provide renewable natural gas for city vehicles, starting with waste collection trucks.

== Water and wastewater ==
Toronto has a vast network to manage water delivery and to process wastewater.
