= Toronto International Dragon Boat Race Festival =

Canadian cultural event

The Toronto International Dragon Boat Race Festival (TIDBRF), is an annual dragon boat race and cultural event, first held in Toronto, Ontario, Canada in 1989. It will be its 37th year in a row in 2024. It developed from the Toronto Chinese Business Association held in Toronto, Ontario. An associated festival highlights Asian and other cultures in Toronto. It has been acknowledged as a prominent cultural occasion in Toronto, fostering heritage and arts.

Typically, more than 5,000 athletes take part in the traditional dragon boat race, accompanied by over 80 local artists, artisans, and heritage performers. There are 200+ volunteers participating in this 2-day event, which attracts over 65,000 visitors to Toronto Centre Island.

== Venue ==
Races were originally held at the Ontario Place West Channel at Ontario Place, and since 2007 races have taken place in the Main Channel at Centre Island, one of the Toronto Islands. The Main Channel race course is 500 metres (550 yd) long and six lanes wide. A 200 metres (220 yd) long race also takes place during the same event.

== Format and Rules ==
Races occur over two days in June. Once separated into Community and Corporate categories, races were combined into the following categories for the 18th (2006) festival:

- Premier Mixed (at least 8 women)
- Premier Women (all women)
- Junior Mixed (at least 8 girls)

In addition to divisional finals seeded by aggregate time from two heats, there are also industry finals for teams representing groups in certain categories. In 2006, these were:

- Community groups
- Non-profit groups and charities
- Universities
- Other education groups
- Hospitals
- Industries
- Breast cancer survivors
- Technology & Communications companies
- Pharmaceutical companies
