= Beltline Trail =

Rail trail in Toronto, Ontario

Coordinates: 43.695998°N 79.398397°W

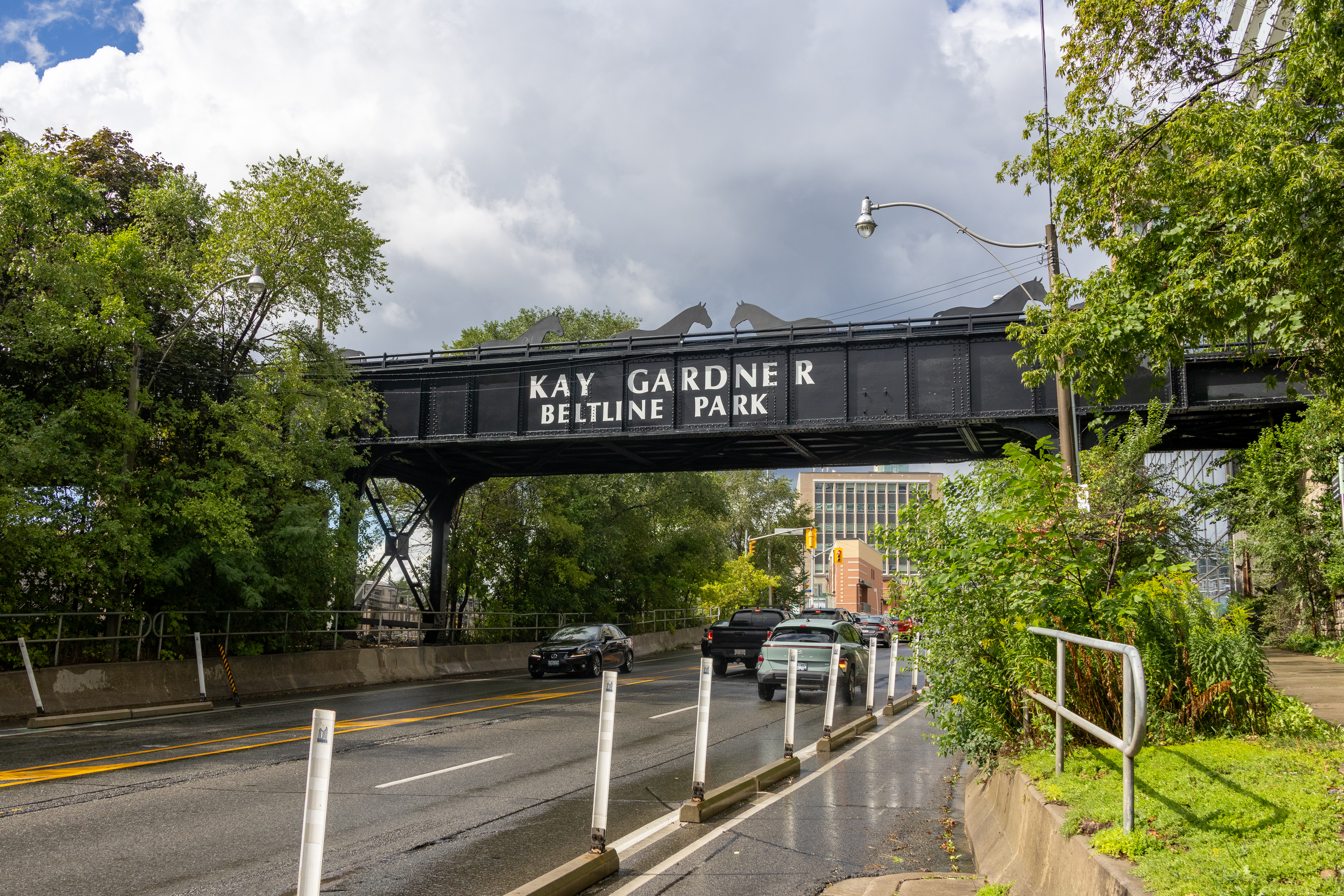
- Bridge over Yonge Street
- Length: 9 km (5.6 mi)
- Location: Toronto, Ontario, Canada
- Established: 1989; 37 years ago
- Trailheads: Bowie Ave. - Marlee Ave. Allen Rd. - Mt. Pleasant Rd. Moore Ave. - Bayview Ave.
Trail map

The Beltline Trail is a 9-kilometre (5.6 mi)-long cycling and walking rail trail in Toronto, Ontario, Canada. It consists of three sections, the York Beltline Trail west of Allen Road, the Kay Gardner Beltline Park from the Allen to Mount Pleasant Road, and the Ravine Beltline Trail south of Mount Pleasant Cemetery through the Moore Park Ravine. Built on the former right-of-way of the Toronto Belt Line Railway, the linear park passes through the neighbourhoods of Rosedale, Moore Park, Forest Hill, Chaplin Estates, and Fairbank.

== History ==
The Toronto Belt Line Railway opened in 1892. It was constructed as a commuter railway line to service and promote new suburban neighbourhoods north of the then city limits. The railway consisted of two separate loops both starting and ending at Union Station. The east loop started at Union Station, running east until turning north along the Don River, passing the Don Valley Brick Works, up through Moore Park Ravine and along the northern edge of Mount Pleasant Cemetery. Crossing over Yonge Street and what is now the Davisville Subway Yard, the loop continued northwest until Spadina Avenue, where it crossed Eglinton Avenue and turned west, eventually meeting up with the Grand Trunk Railway (GTR) railway tracks (now the GO Barrie line) just west of Caledonia Road. From there, the route circled south back to Union Station.

The passenger train service was never profitable and only lasted two years. Parts of the rail line then sat unused. In 1910, the GTR rebuilt the northern portion of the Yonge St. loop for freight service. Trains ran along this line until the late 1960s when a small part of the right-of-way was expropriated to build the Spadina Expressway, now Allen Road. This ended rail service east of Marlee Avenue, just before Allen Road.

In 1970, Canadian National Railway (CN) tried to sell the right-of-way east of Allen Road for housing since the land was quite valuable. This set the stage for one of the first public battles on biking trails. Most homeowners adjacent to the line wished to buy the land to extend their backyards, complaining of safety issues, vandals, and lovers. A local citizen, Esther Carin, lobbied to turn the section east of Allen Road into a recreation trail.

The land was purchased by the city in 1972 as part of a land swap with CN that included the Metro Toronto Convention Centre on Front Street. Later, a trail on the west side of the Allen would be established as well.

CN sold the remaining line west of Allen Road to the city in 1988 and its conversion to a trail began. The bridge over Yonge Street had deteriorated and was refurbished in 1993. In 1999–2000 the part of the trail from Allen Road to Mount Pleasant Road was designated the Kay Gardner Beltline Park after a local councillor, Kay Gardner, who was also involved with the negotiations for that segment of the trail.

== Trail description ==
The trail reuses almost all of the old railway space from west of Caledonia Road east to the Don River. Most roads are crossed at grade, with no formal pedestrian crosswalks; the addition of crosswalks was recommended in a 2013 report.

From the west, the York Belt Line trail section begins just west of Caledonia Road at the former GTR line, now GO Transit's Barrie line. It proceeds east to the limited-access Allen Road, first passing over the old iron bridge that crosses Dufferin Street, between Castlefield Ave. and Eglinton Ave. There is no crossing over the Allen, and trail users must use footpaths parallel to the Allen to reach the nearest road bridge a half-block north or south. The Kay Gardner Beltline Park trail heads east, crossing the bridge over Yonge Street and the Davisville Subway Yard south of Davisville Avenue, passes through Mount Pleasant Cemetery and ends at Mount Pleasant Road.

The trail then continues southwards through the Moore Park Ravine alongside Mud Creek, a small tributary of the Don River. From this section, an alternate switchback trail through Chorley Park was opened in November 2018. The trail passes the Don Valley Brick Works and terminates shortly after reaching Bayview Avenue, at a crossroads with two other trails, Park Drive Reservation Trail and Milkman's Lane.

A series of technical biking or hiking trails including Cudmore Creek and Crothers Woods can be reached from Bayview, making it possible to extend the trail through to the Sunnybrook Estates to the north-west or Taylor Creek Park and Scarborough to the east.

Three installations commemorating the former train stations of the Belt Line Railway were installed in 2021: Yonge Station, Upper Canada Station and Eglinton Station. The City of Toronto has a planned design to create two more "Lost Stations". Forest Hill and Fairbank commemorative stations will have a similar appearance to the existing installations, with a material palette reminiscent of the historical stations.

== See also ==
- List of trails in Canada
