= Don Valley Brick Works =

Former quarry and industrial site in Toronto, Canada

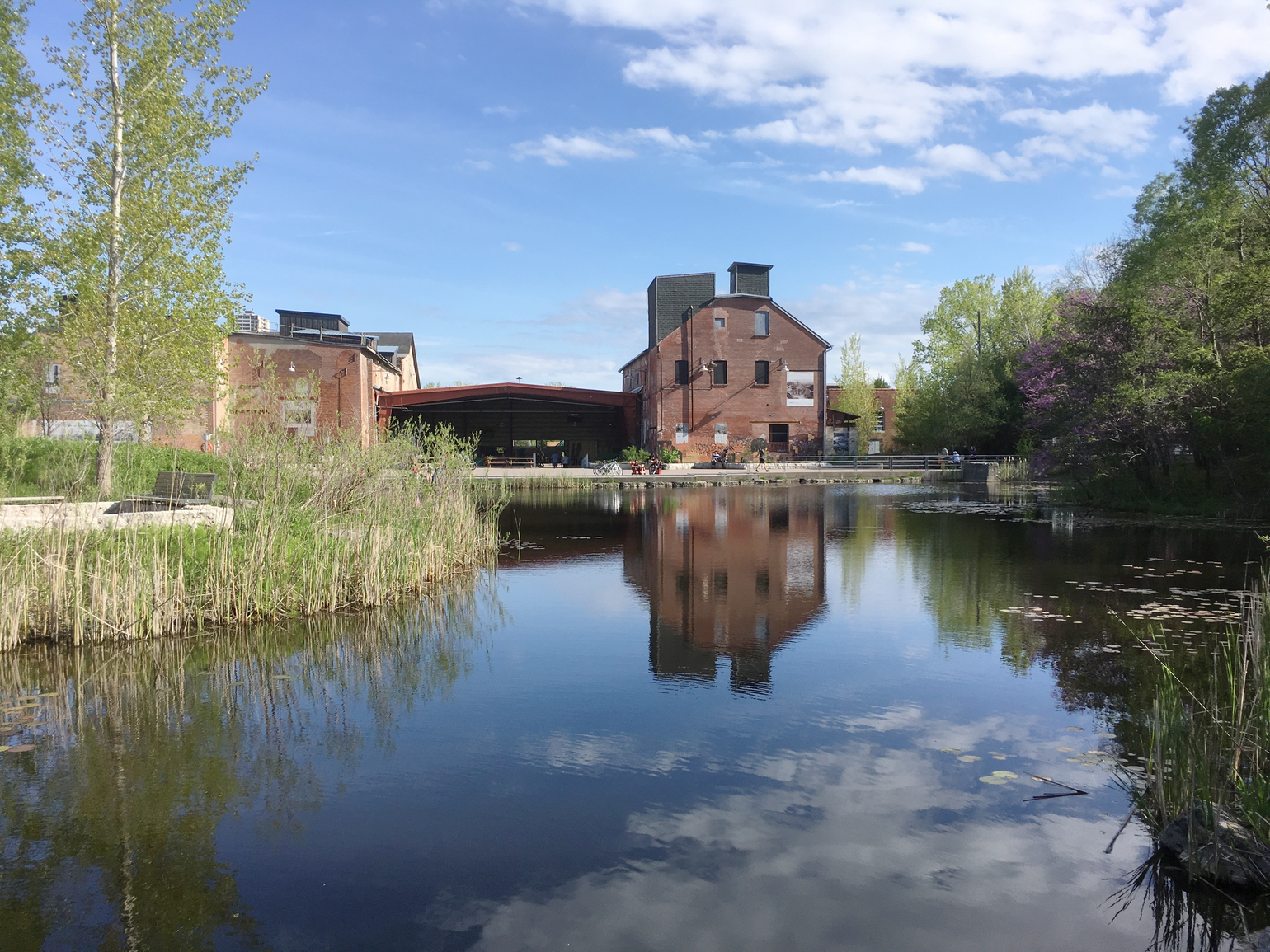
- Wetland ponds with the Don Valley Brick Works industrial complex in the background

- Location within Toronto
- Type: Nature park
- Location: 550 Bayview Avenue, Toronto, Ontario, Canada
- Coordinates: 43.684667°N 79.36528°W
- Area: 16.4 hectares (41 acres)
- Established: 1997
- Owner: Toronto and Region Conservation Authority
- Administrator: Toronto Parks and Recreation Division
- Visitors: >500,000
- Status: Open year-round
- Habitats: Freshwater ponds, meadows, wetlands, and woodlands
- Water: Mud Creek and the Don River
- Vegetation: Carolinian forest vegetation
- Parking: 1 parking lot

The Don Valley Brick Works (often referred to as the Evergreen Brick Works) is a former quarry and industrial site located in the Don River Valley in Toronto, Ontario, Canada. The Don Valley Brick Works operated for nearly 100 years and provided bricks used to construct many well-known Toronto landmarks, such as Casa Loma, Osgoode Hall, Massey Hall, and the Ontario Legislature. Since the closure of the original factory, the quarry has been converted into a city park which includes a series of naturalized ponds, while the buildings have been restored and opened as an environmentally focused community and cultural centre by Evergreen, a national charity dedicated to restoring nature in urban environments.

== History ==
=== Industrial history ===
The Don Valley Brick Works was created in 1889 by the Taylor brothers. John Taylor and his brothers, William and George, had purchased the site in the Don Valley in the 1830s where they established a paper mill. While digging post holes to make a fence, William came across some good quality clay. He took a sample to a local brick works where it was confirmed that it would make a high quality brick. A quarry was soon established at the north end of the site and a brick making plant was built at the south end of the property near the Don River.

The Don Valley Pressed Brick Company produced bricks using three techniques. The first was called a soft-mud process. Clay quarried from the site was mixed with water from nearby Mud Creek, placed in moulds which were dried and then baked in kilns. A second technique called dry-press bricks used quarried shale. The shale was placed into moulds and machine pressed. A third process called stiff-mud used a mixture of clay and shale that used less water than the soft-mud process. A column of clay was forced through a die which was then cut to form using a wire. Finished product was shipped by cart out of the valley along Pottery Road or by rail on a spur built into the yard. Bricks were used mostly in Toronto but were used across the continent. The bricks made were of such good quality that they won prizes at the Chicago World's Fair in 1893 and the Toronto Industrial Fair in 1894.

In 1893, the company added a continuous down-draft kiln which increased the quality and amount of bricks produced. By 1907 the company had two of these kilns in operation and was producing between 85,000 and 100,000 bricks per day. After a 1904 major fire destroyed much of downtown Toronto, the Brick Works supplied the brick for much of the ensuing construction.

In 1909, the Taylors sold the company to Robert Davies (a brother-in-law married to sister Margaret Anne Taylor). Davies changed the name to the Don Valley Brick Company Limited. In the 1920s a major expansion resulted in a name change to the Don Valley Brick Works Limited. Electricity was added and a new sand-lime plant was added that created a less expensive brick used for interior construction. In 1928, the company was sold to Strathgowan Investments and was renamed again to the Toronto Brick Company. At this time the company had reached peak production of about 25 million bricks per year. During the Great Depression, the area to the south of the Brick Works became a large encampment of indigent men from around Canada. They built shanties and were assisted by Toronto residents. During the winters, the men would sleep inside the Brick Works kilns. The company also operated a brick making facility in Birch Cliff from 1913 to 1963 on what was once a sand and gravel quarry. John Price Limited, a smaller brickmaker in east end Toronto on Greenwood Avenue was acquired then merged into the Toronto Brick Company and ceased operating in 1935.

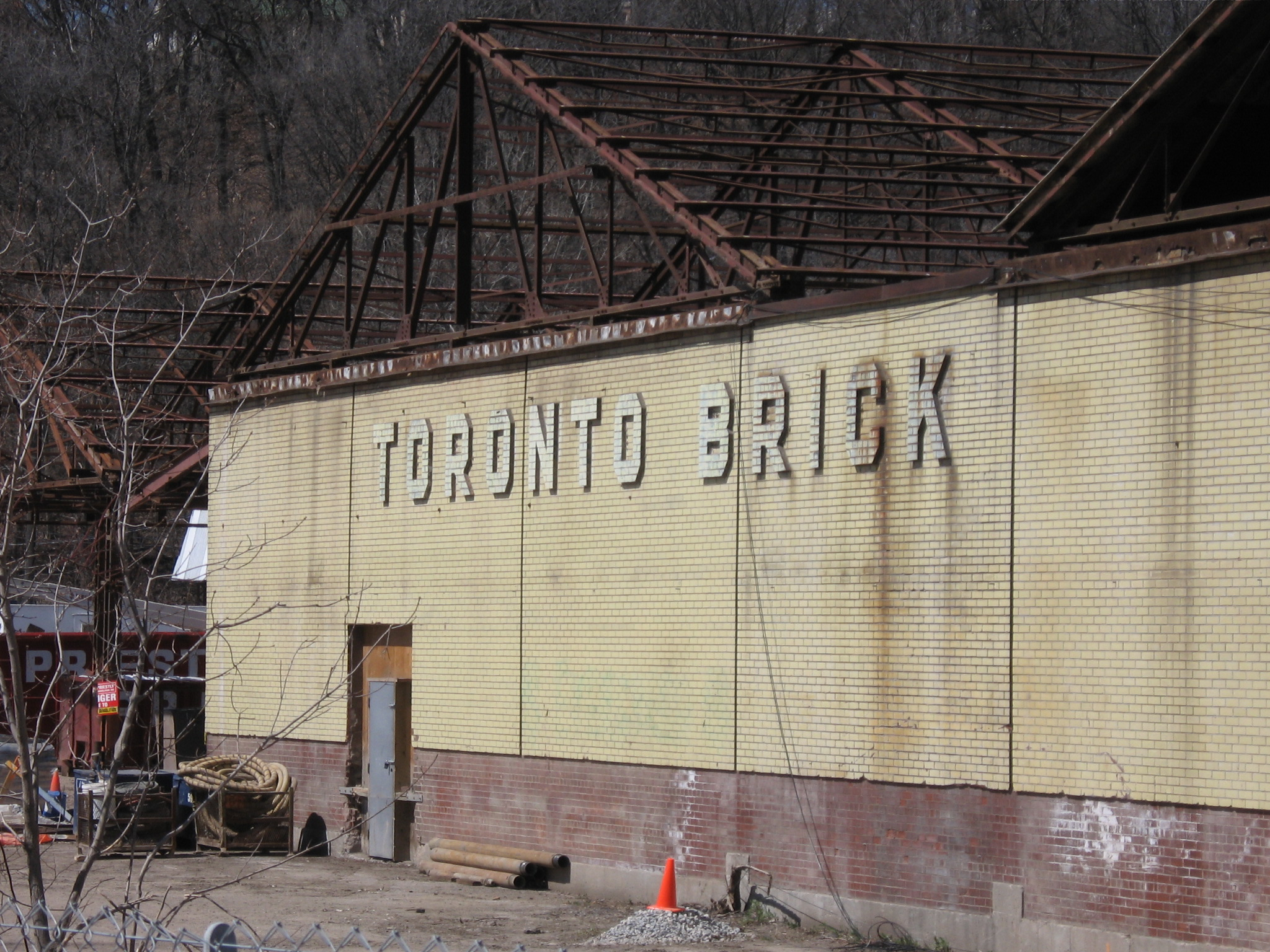
Facade of old Toronto Brick company spelled out in relief with bricks

During World War II, production was reduced. The plant used German prisoners of war that were housed at nearby Todmorden Mills. After the war a building boom revived demand. However, the sand-lime plant was destroyed by fire in 1946. Also the plant consolidated its outbuildings and three of the four signature chimneys were knocked down. Only one chimney remains today. The site underwent many changes during its existence, adding and removing buildings whenever and wherever it was conducive to the brick making process. The buildings, cluttered on the south end of the site, are all rectilinear buildings arranged in a grid-like pattern, connected wherever the users saw a need.

In 1956, United Ceramics Limited of Germany acquired the Brick Works. Over the next 25 years a new sand-lime plant was constructed. Also a Parkhill Martin Brick machine was moved from a nearby brick works to this site. It produced soft-mud bricks for the antique market. By the 1980s most of the usable clay and shale had been quarried. The company decided to offer the land to the city for $4 million CAD for conservation purposes. However, a company called Torvalley Associates offered $4,001,000 for the site and purchased the site. East York Council allowed the site to be re-zoned for a housing development.

=== Restoration into an environmental park ===
The Toronto and Region Conservation Authority had final say on the matter since the site was partially on the floodplain of the valley. They expropriated the land in 1989 but were forced to pay approximately $14,000,000 since the land was zoned as residential. Another company, Brampton Brick leased the site and purchased the remaining equipment. They operated a retail outlet at the site until 1991.

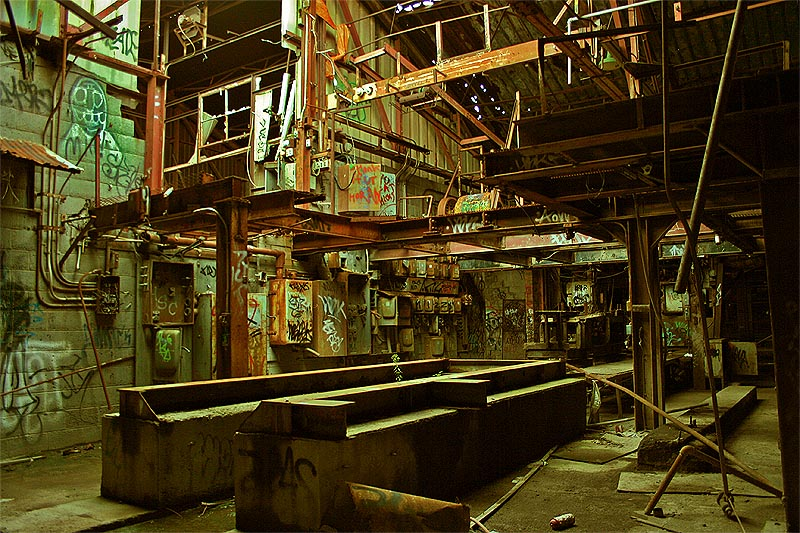
Inside the main atrium of the Don Valley Brick Works

The fill in of the quarry began in the late 1940s. It was used as a city dump for years.

In 1994, restoration of the site began. The quarry was filled in using material from the excavation of the Scotia Plaza tower in downtown Toronto. Once filled, the site was landscaped to create a series of three ponds using water diverted from Mud Creek. The water flows out of the ponds into a channel that was used to divert water into the brick plant. The channel then flows underneath Bayview Avenue and back into the Don River. The remaining area was turned into meadow. The shores of the ponds were planted with native trees, shrubs and wildflowers. The site was officially opened in 1997 and christened the Weston Family Quarry Garden. The Beltline Trail, along the path of the old Toronto Belt Line Railway, passes by the Brick Works. Since then, the site has attracted many species of birds and animals. Although no fish were stocked in the ponds, fish have migrated into the ponds from the Don River. The ponds have also become a dumping ground for goldfish and red-eared slider turtles that have outgrown their home terrariums.

==== 21st century ====
Evergreen, a Canadian non-profit organization whose activities have included stewardship of the Don Valley Brick Works buildings site since 2008, has transformed the abandoned buildings into a cultural centre with a focus on the environment. Having leased the "industrial pad" portion of the site from the Toronto Region and Conservation Authority, Evergreen has renovated several of the existing structures and constructed one new building known as the Centre for Green Cities. The goal of the revitalization is adaptive reuse, where most of the buildings will be reinforced where needed and repurposed to house the new programming planned for the site. In this way, the site can be recycled as much as possible and the historical integrity of the Don Valley Brick Works can be maintained.

Evergreen Brick Works will be an education centre addressing the themes of nature, culture and community. [...] [I]t will be a destination for families and individuals to enjoy a natural refuge, while sampling a rich offering of programs and services - from gardening workshops, heritage tours, and clay-making and organic food markets, to a retail nursery, demonstration gardens and leading-edge green design techniques.

$20 million of the project's $55-million dollar budget was pledged by the federal government under the Canada Strategic Infrastructure Fund, and the Province of Ontario contributed an additional $10 million. The construction process began in November 2008, and grand opening of Evergreen Brick Works took place September 28, 2010. The complex is now open to the public, with regular shuttle bus service running daily from Broadview Subway Station. Public transit is also available from Davisville subway station by bus route 28 Bayview South.

Design and construction was a joint venture between Du Toit Allsopp Hiller Architects, Diamond Schmitt Architects, and several other prominent firms. DTAH is responsible for the master planning, while Diamond Schmitt are the designers of the new building, which includes the Young Welcome Centre. Other programming for the site includes art exhibits, children's programming, garden centre, and office space for Evergreen and other environmental organizations.

Restoration to the building include structural reinforcement, and replacement of material such as the current asbestos transite roofing in favour of a more effective, longer lasting material. Several of the buildings were left without roof cladding in order to create open air spaces, leaving the steel trusses visible. The building's red-brick masonry was preserved as much as possible, while interiors were renovated to update plumbing, life safety and mechanical systems, as outlined in Evergreen's Master Plan Update 2007. Each building has programming set aside for it in DTAH's planning scheme, such that the project can continue to expand as funds become available.

In 2009, National Geographic Traveler named Evergreen Brick Works one of the 10 finalists in its Geotourism Challenge 2009, "a global competition of tourism-related projects that promote natural and cultural heritage while improving the well-being of the local people". The 10 finalists were chosen from 610 entries from 81 countries.

Since 2010 the Evergreen Brick Works has been home to the private school Gradale Academy. Outward Bound Canada has operated out of the location since 2011.

In 2024, during a major flooding event in southern Ontario, Evergreen Brick Works experienced severe flood damage. While it was built to mitigate weather-related risk, using 20,000 litre rain barrels, permeable materials, and green spaces designed to support stormwater absorption, the site is located on a flood plain and was not able to withstand the extent of the flooding. Owners of on-site eatery the Picnic Café estimated the cost of repairs of the café alone at $200,000 to $300,000.

As of 26 July 2024, the non-profit that operates Evergreen Brick Works was continuing to raise money to support repairs.

== Weston Family Quarry Garden ==
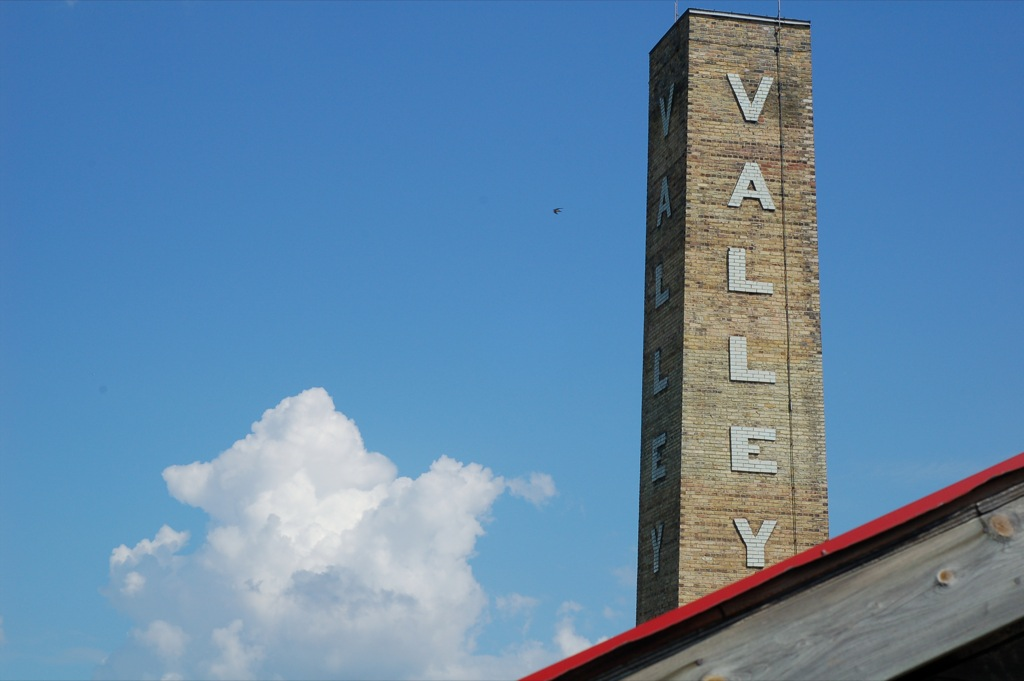
Smokestack at the Don Valley Brick Works

The park section of the Brick Works, managed by the City of Toronto, includes a series of three ponds, a large meadow and a small forest. The ponds are fed by a diversion pipe running from Mud Creek which flows just to the west of the Brick Works. Initially, the area adjacent to the ponds was planted with species native to Ontario. This also included some species that are not locally native including tulip tree, fragrant sumac and eastern redbud. These Carolinian species, typically found farther south, are at the northern limit of their range in Toronto.

Once the wetlands became established, many species of birds have visited to forage or breed. Mammals, reptiles (including Midland painted turtle and snapping turtle), amphibians, and some fish have also found their way to the Brick Works and have established themselves. This includes ducks, Canada geese, toads, muskrats, sparrows, and others.

The Brick Works wetland is connected to a number of other nature reserve areas via forest trail, and is part of a larger effort to reestablish the Don Valley watershed.

The north quarry wall was the site of a number of important geological discoveries which provided information on the glacial history of southern Ontario. This area, referred to as the Toronto Brickyard, was designated as an earth science Area of Natural and Scientific Interest (ANSI) by the Ontario Ministry of Natural Resources in 2009 for exhibiting "Ordovician Georgian Bay Formation, Illinoian Glacial York Till, Sangamonian Interglacial Don Formation and Wisconsian Glacial Scarborough delta, Pottery Road sediments and Sunnybrook Till all overlain by North Bay Interstadial, Lake Iroquois sands."

== See also ==
- Doors Open Toronto
- List of parks in Toronto
- List of quarries
- John Taylor (paper manufacturer), the elder brother of William and George Taylor
