= Todmorden Mills =

Former paper mill and settlement on the Don River in Toronto

Coordinates: 43.68625°N 79.36024°W

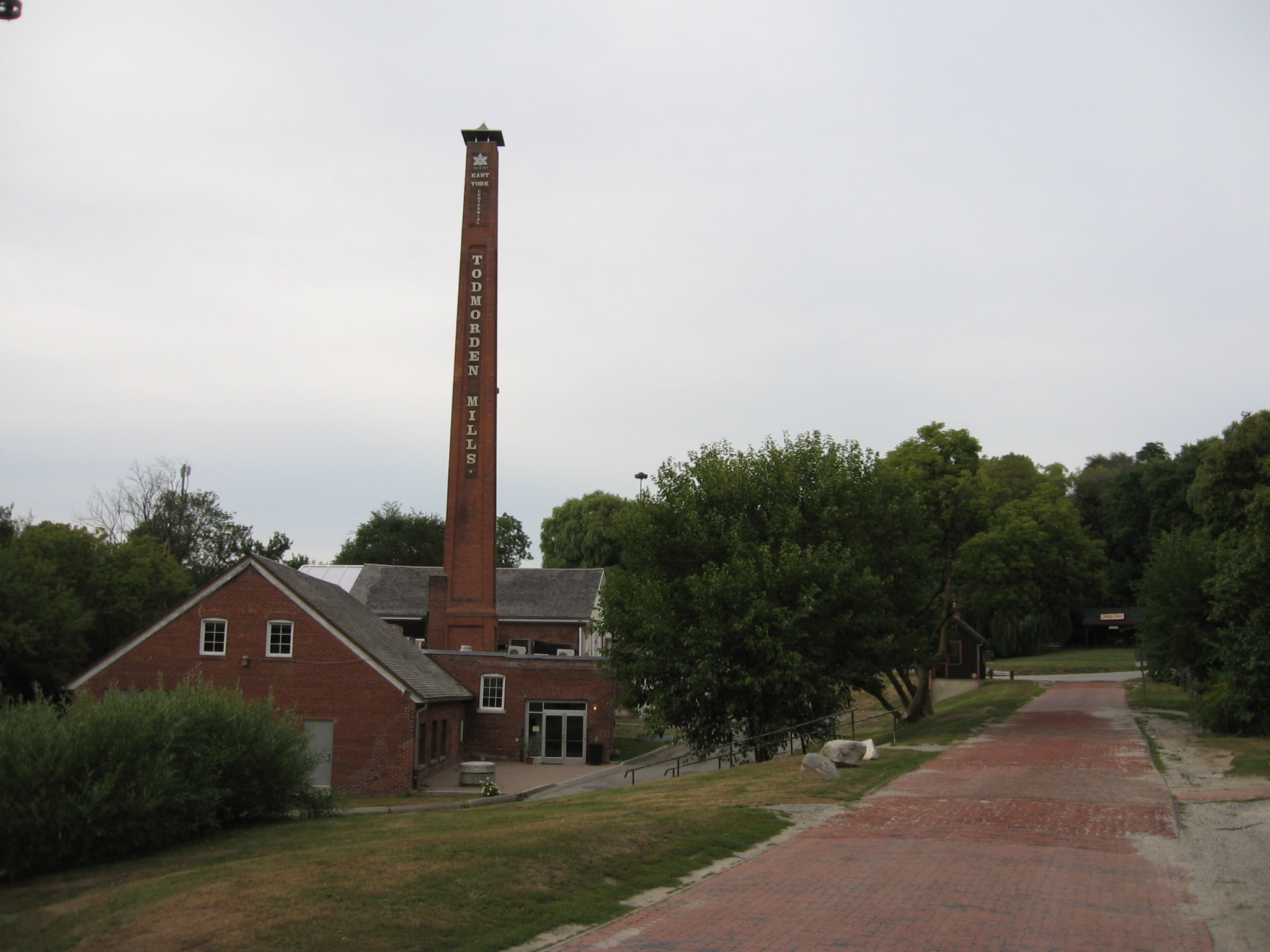
The restored paper mill at Todmorden Mills Heritage Museum and Art Centre.

Todmorden Mills was a small settlement located in the Don River valley in Toronto, Ontario. It started out as a lumber mill in the 1790s. Originally known as "Don Mills", it grew into a small industrial complex and village before becoming part of East York in the 20th century. Currently the valley site is occupied by the Todmorden Mills Heritage Museum and Arts Centre, which includes the museum, art gallery, a theatre and a forest preserve.

== History ==
In 1795, the settlement of York in Upper Canada was a small but growing community on the shores of Lake Ontario. To supply construction material, Lieutenant-Governor John Graves Simcoe granted land on the Don River to Aaron and Isaiah Skinner for the purpose of building a mill to supply lumber. Simcoe wrote to a friend "A mill should be build [sic] thereon". A third partner to the Skinner's was their Brother-in-Law, Parsall Terry - husband to their Sister, Rhoda Skinner. Parshall was the first Watermaster on the Don and died in 1808 while trying to cross the Don via horseback during floodstage. He had also been a member of the first Legislature of Upper Canada.

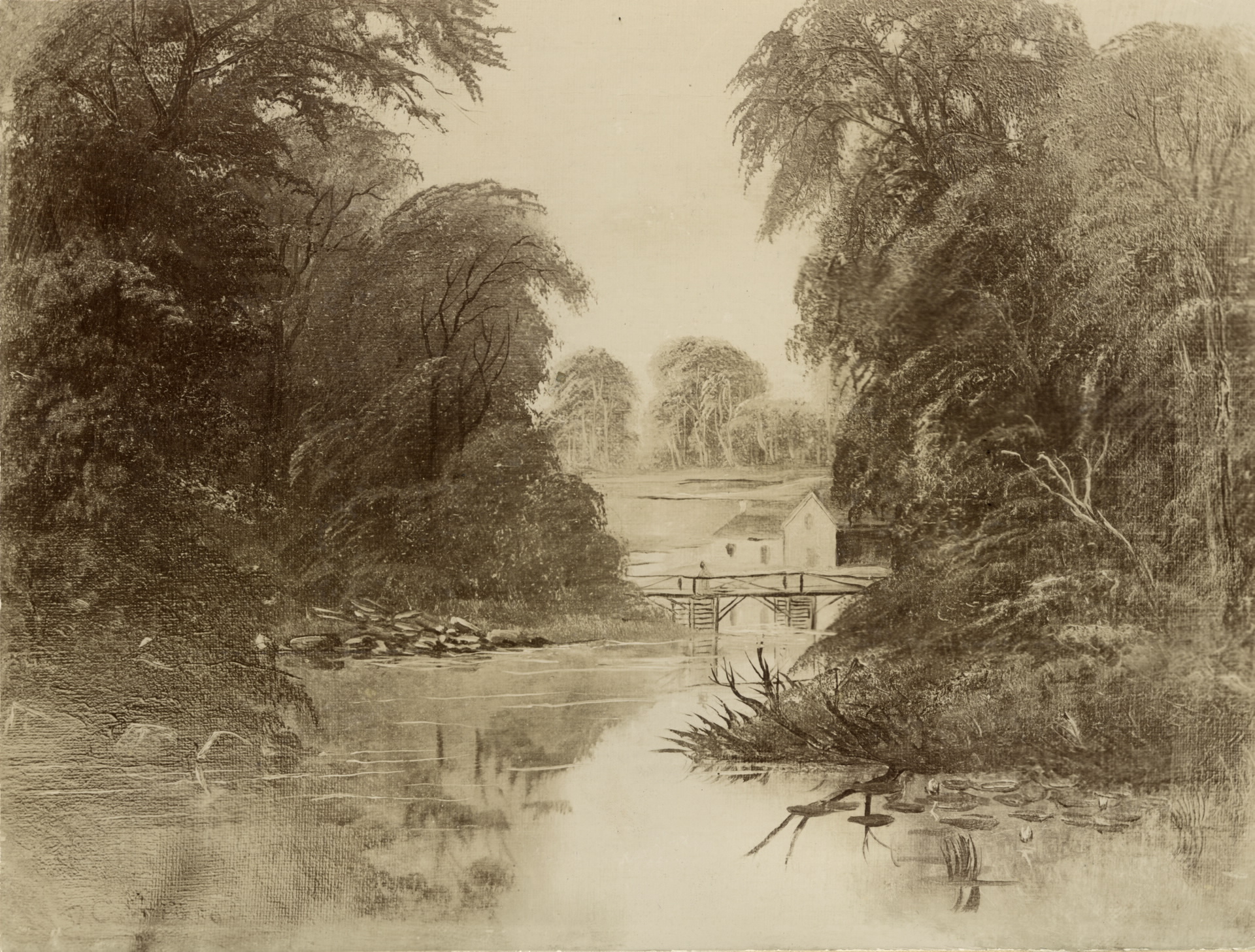
Todmorden Mills, c. 1860s; when it was operated by the Taylor family.

The mill was operated by the Skinners until about 1855, when it was sold to the Taylor family. In 1820, a brewery (Helliwell or Don Brewery) was built next to the mill and operated by Thomas Helliwell and John Eastwood. The Helliwell family operated it until 1855, when it too was sold to the Taylor family. Todmorden Mills acquired its name from John Eastwood, one of the original brewery owners. His family had emigrated from Todmorden, a town then straddling the two counties of Lancashire and Yorkshire in England.

The Taylors owned a number of industrial mills in the neighbourhood including the Don Valley Brick Works. Under their ownership the mill was converted to produce felt paper. The mill continued to operate until the 1920s when the building was converted into a riding stable.

In the early 1940s, the site became the location of a small German prisoner of war camp. The camp housed men from the German merchant marine who were interned in Allied ports at the start of the war. The prisoners often worked as labourers at the nearby Don Valley Brick Works. In 1945, the prisoners were repatriated and the camp was shut down. Soon afterwards, the camp buildings were destroyed by fire, likely set by vandals.

Between 1930 and 1967, the property housed a collection of horse riding schools and light industry. In the 1930s, the Windermere Riding Academy used the property. Don Vale Textiles occupied the property in the late 1940s. From 1950 and 1963, the Whitewood Riding School was housed at the stables.

During the building of the Don Valley Parkway, the site was extensively modified. The river which used to pass through the site in a wide meander was straightened so that it was entirely cut off from the site. The former riverbed was turned into a pond and the bridge that used to cross the river is now only used to reach a parking lot.

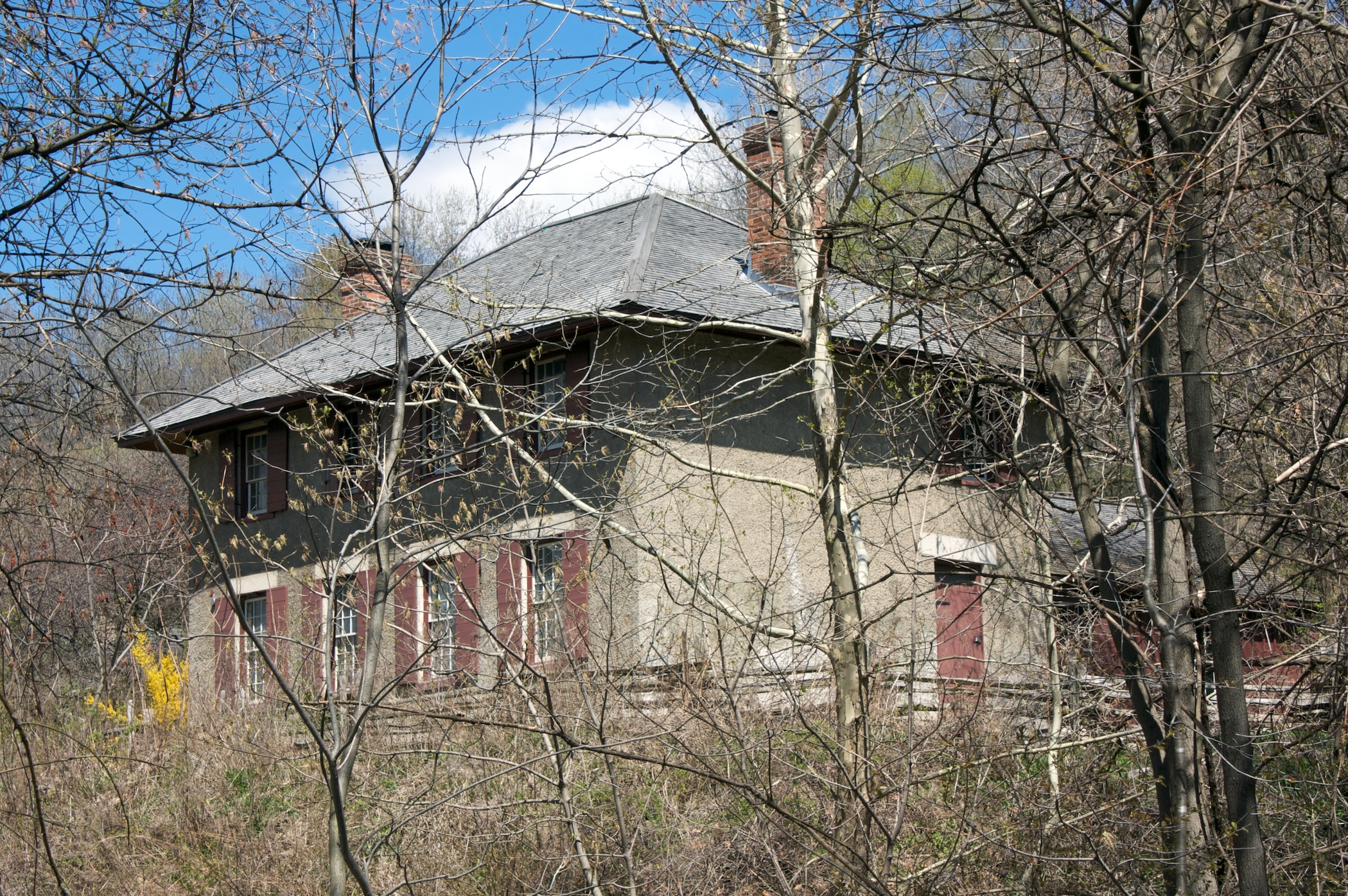
The Helliwell House is one of four historic buildings at Todmorden Mills.

In 1965, the mill site was proposed as a centennial project by East York's mayor, True Davidson. On May 22, 1967, it was opened as the Todmorden Mills Historic Site and started to function as a community museum. Davidson remained as an honorary curator until her death in 1978. Currently the museum maintains four buildings from the original settlement including the old paper mill which dates from 1825, a brewery and two homes. The Don railway station was moved to Todmorden in 1969, and remained at Todmorden until 2009 when it was moved to Roundhouse Park. In the near future, the museum is hoping to re-restore Helliwell House to resemble its appearance in the 1890s.

In 1991, two local naturalists, Charles Sauriol and Dave Money proposed that a small forested area adjacent to the museum site be turned into a nature preserve. A committee was formed and the Todmorden Mills Wildflower Preserve was created. Since then the committee has performed restoration in the forest to remove non-native invasive species and restore flowers and trees native to the Toronto area.

== See also ==
- John Taylor (paper manufacturer)
- Pape Village
