= Cat's Eye (novel) =

1988 novel by Margaret Atwood

- Author: Margaret Atwood
- Cover artist: T. M. Craan, design; Jamie Bennet, illustration (first edition, hardback)
- Language: English
- Genre: Novel
- Publisher: McClelland and Stewart
- Publication date: September 1988
- Publication place: Canada
- Media type: Print (Hardback and Paperback)
- Pages: 420 (first edition, hardback)
- ISBN: 0-7710-0817-1 (first edition, hardback)
- OCLC: 19271117
- Dewey Decimal: 813/.54 20
- LC Class: PR9199.3.A8 C38 1988b
- Preceded by: The Handmaid's Tale
- Followed by: Wilderness Tips

Cat's Eye is a 1988 novel by Canadian writer Margaret Atwood about fictional painter Elaine Risley, who vividly reflects on her childhood and teenage years. Her strongest memories are of Cordelia, who was the leader of a trio of girls who were both very cruel and very kind to her in ways that tint Elaine's perceptions of relationships and her world — not to mention her art — into her middle years. The novel unfolds in mid-20th century Canada, from World War II to the late 1980s, and includes a look at many of the cultural elements of that time period, including feminism and various modern art movements. The book was a finalist for the 1988 Governor General's Award and for the 1989 Booker Prize.

== Explanation of the title ==
Elaine and her brother Stephen play marbles as children; Elaine keeps a prized possession, a cat's eye marble, in her childhood plastic red purse. The cat's eye later appears as a common motif in Elaine's paintings, linked with those she perceived to be an ally, although she does not remember why it is associated with those feelings. Elaine rediscovers the red purse years later, and as she looks through it, she regains all the memories she had lost: "her life entire".

== Plot summary ==
Elaine's childhood story is told in the first person narrative in flashbacks with brief snippets from her present adult life.

After being lured back to her childhood home of Toronto for a retrospective show of her art, Elaine reminisces about her childhood. At the age of eight she becomes friends with Carol and Grace, and, through their eyes, realises that her atypical background of constant travel with her entomologist father and independent mother has left her ill-equipped for conventional expectations of femininity. Although initially awkward and naive of childhood politics and social structure, Elaine is accepted, even admired by her new friends. Her lifestyle, even now, is exotic to the others. Elaine, after fantasizing about having girl friends during her nomadic brief existence, begins to settle in and enjoy her new life and new school.

After her first full year of attending traditional grade school, during her summer break, her parents return her to their previous life of travel and insect exploration. After a four-month absence, Elaine returns home to her friends for the next school year.

Upon her return, Elaine finds the dynamic of her group has been altered with the addition of the new girl, Cordelia. Elaine is first drawn in by Cordelia but after a period, sensing her inability to recognize the cruelty, Elaine is bullied by the three girls, her supposed "best friends." The bullying takes place mostly in the form of a seemingly benevolent attempt by the three girls to 'improve' Elaine's character and behavior. They seemingly try to educate her and display a constant disappointment in Elaine's inability to comply to their standards.

Any self-esteem Elaine has developed in her new life having been destroyed, she gradually becomes depressed and feels helpless, unable to stand up to them or rescue herself. She continually complies with the demeaning demands of the group and considers the worst transgression she could ever commit would be to tattle on her "friends," a sick loyalty nurtured and fed by Cordelia, who has two older sisters, apparently treating her in a similar manner. Elaine, despite her parents' concern, even accompanies Grace and her family to their church, which, to Grace's amazement and curiosity, is Elaine's first exposure to mainstream religion. Her newly found faith is tested when she continues to be poorly treated, even by Grace's mother.

The bullying escalates that winter when the girls throw Elaine's hat into a ravine and then abandon her to climb out of the ravine river water, half-frozen. On the brink of panic, Elaine sees a vision of the Virgin Mary, whom she learned about in Grace's church. In a haze, an illusion of the Virgin guides Elaine to safety. Afterward, realizing she allowed herself to be a victim all along, Elaine is finally able to make a break and makes new friends.

Later, now in high school, and earlier events somewhat repressed, Elaine reestablishes a friendship with Cordelia but without Carol or Grace, who have both moved out of the area. Elaine is much tougher now than when she was as a child, and the tables turn as she often taunts Cordelia.

Cordelia, it appears, is experiencing her own crisis and has trouble applying herself to her studies and begins to act out. Elaine feels a mix of triumph, contempt and pity when she realizes she has outgrown Cordelia. She is relieved that she can no longer be manipulated by the girl who essentially was the leader and the number one bully during their childhood.

Her last exchanges with Cordelia in high school are bleak when Elaine sees Cordelia is depressed and her behavior has prevented her from graduating on schedule. After Cordelia is sent to a private school for delinquent girls, the two girls lose touch with one another after high school.

Elaine, working part-time in a diner and attending university, meets with Cordelia after a period of losing touch. Cordelia appears to have regained her former slyness and tells Elaine that instead of attending university, Cordelia has undertaken acting. She subtly brags about her roles in the Shakespearean Festival and invites Elaine to attend one of her performances.

After a couple of years, Elaine again meets with Cordelia who has completely fallen off the tracks and has been committed to a mental facility by her parents. Overmedicated and desperate, she begs Elaine to help her escape from the hospital. Despite her guilt and latent anger, Elaine refuses to help Cordelia. A few weeks after their meeting, Elaine receives a return-to-sender letter she sent Cordelia in the hospital. It appears Cordelia found a way to escape without Elaine. Not knowing it, this would be Elaine's last time seeing Cordelia.

The narrative describes Elaine through early adulthood as an art student and a burgeoning feminist artist, although Elaine's feminist label is media engineered, not self-proclaimed. She begins to find herself and develop her artistic identity, fumbling her way through her art and personal relationships. However, throughout this time, she continues to be haunted by her childhood and has difficulties forming relationships with other women. Although she increasingly becomes a known and influential artist, Elaine is beset by anger, guilt, confusion and bewilderment of the lasting effects of Cordelia's behavior and her eventual disappearance from Elaine's life.

Towards the end of the novel, owing to her retrospective exhibition and her return to Toronto, she eventually faces her past and gets closure.

== Themes ==
Cat's Eye explores the construction of identity; it is written mostly as flashbacks, as Elaine reflects on the forgotten events of her childhood that shaped her personality and struggles to integrate lost aspects of her self. In Elaine's self-portrait, a pier glass reflects three little girls who are not in the painting, demonstrating their simultaneous absence from Elaine's past and their presence in who she has become.

Elaine's story is detailed in rich visualizations and descriptions of her art reflecting her childhood influences, not only by the trio of girls, but also by her rootless untraditional upbringing, and relationships with her parents who remain nameless and unidentified throughout the story; her genius brother and his strange ways and fate; her comforting secret alliances with the male gender; kind and stern female teachers; art instructors; peer artists; the media; motherhood and mid-life confrontation of self. The country of Canada itself also has a prominent role that acts as an additional character with her experiences in Toronto. The British monarchy is featured as a vivid childhood influence with a young Queen Elizabeth II's perceived bravery and aplomb after World War II.

== Classification ==
According to Margaret Atwood the novel belongs to the genre she calls "Best Girlfriend". Atwood further explains:

In the last small while there has been a spate of novels by such leading writers as Toni Morrison, Joyce Carol Oates, Gail Godwin and Alice Walker examining relationships between women – not the sisters, the cousins and the aunts, the grannies and mothers of books like Joan Chase’s During the Reign of The Queen of Persia and Marilynne Robinson’s Housekeeping, nor the lovers of the many novels featuring lesbians that have appeared since Radclyffe Hall’s Well of Loneliness and Rita Mae Brown’s Rubyfruit Jungle, but women bound together by ties more tenuous, though no less intense. Chums, as they used to be called.

The genre makes female friendship central to the thematic concern of fiction unlike traditional fiction that treated it as a fringe element. Atwood further emphasises: "girlhood - not childhood, that neutered term, but girlhood and girlish adolescence, when Best Girlfriends seem to mean the most," is what the fiction revolves around. Accordingly, Cat's Eye is an addition to that genre.

== Allusions to Atwood's life ==
Atwood began Cat's Eye in 1964 but put away the novel until the late 1980s. By that time, her daughter was a teenager, and Atwood had had the opportunity to observe the social dynamics of a group of young girls and boys.

The book is sometimes seen as containing autobiographical elements. For example, like Risley, Atwood is the daughter of an entomologist. Atwood rarely, if ever, commented on the similarities directly. However, in Book of Lives: A Memoir of Sorts, she explained that the story is in fact autobiographical, and that her evasion was partly because "the chief perp was still alive".

== See also ==
- Southern Ontario Gothic
