= John Taylor (paper manufacturer) =

British-born Canadian businessman in the paper industry

- Born: 1809
- Died: 1871 (aged 61–62)
- Occupation: Businessman

John Taylor (1809–1871) was a British-born Toronto-area businessman and a pioneer in the pulp and paper industry.

== Early life ==
The Taylor family immigrated to Upper Canada (via Cherry Valley, New York) in 1821 from Uttoxeter, Staffordshire. By 1834, John Taylor and his brothers, Thomas and George, moved from the village of Vaughan to the Township of York, north-east of the newly created city of Toronto. The brothers set their sights on the banks of the Don River, an area with an already burgeoning pulp and paper industry.

== Paper production ==
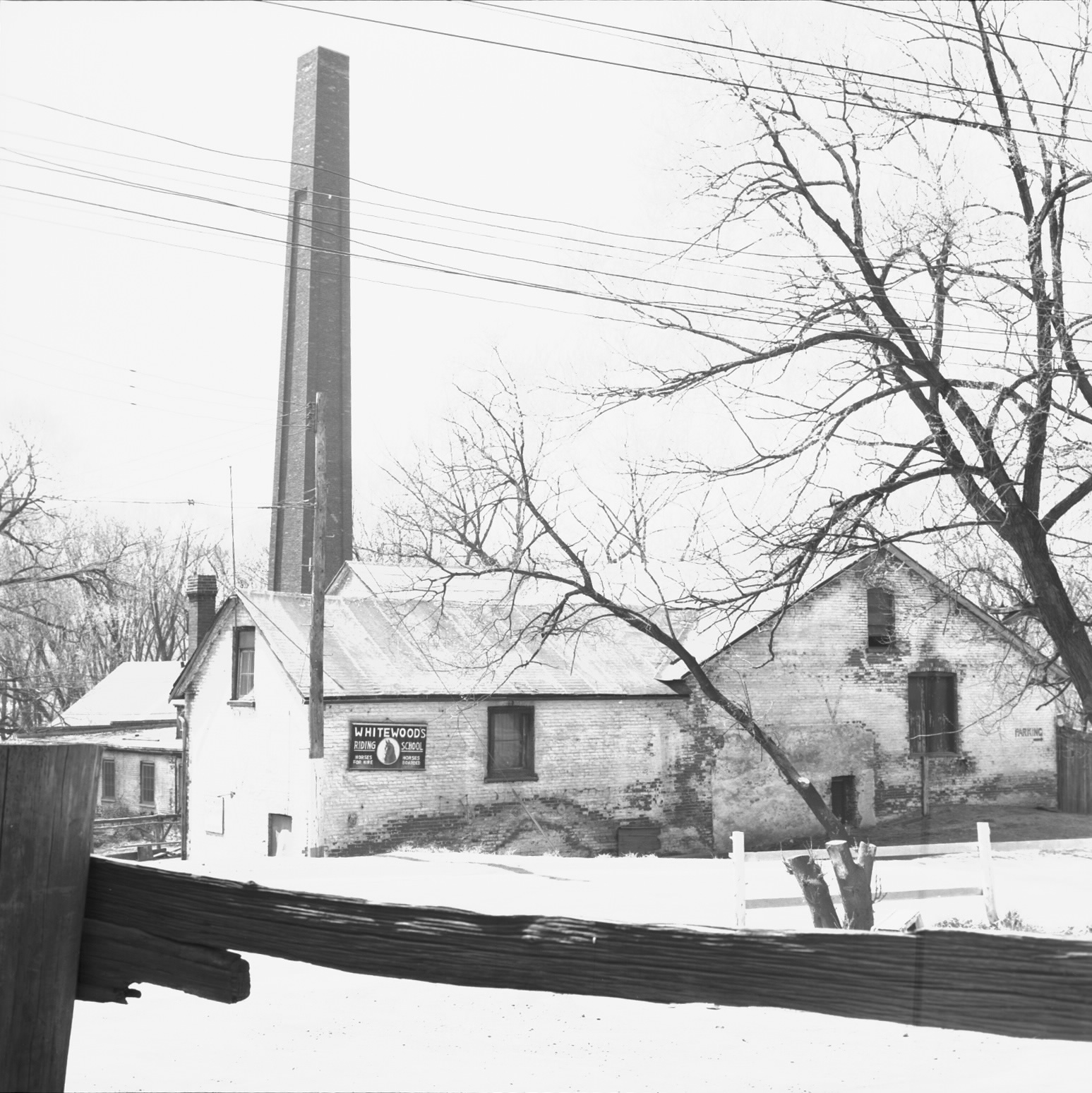
The Taylor brothers' former paper mill in 1958, at the time used by a riding school

The 1850s brought a wave of expansion to the paper industry in Toronto. By this time, Toronto's population had grown to over thirty thousand and this growing community was also becoming more literate, increasing the demand for books and newspapers. The Taylor family business was also expanding: the brothers had already built their first paper mill on the West Don in 1846; in 1851 they purchased a water-powered saw mill, and also purchased the York Paper Mill (later named Todmorden Mills) in 1855. The Taylor mills produced manila paper, newsprint and felt paper, a product used in roofing. The mills were extremely productive and employed 100 people by the 1900s. John, the oldest of the three brothers, was the manager of the mills.

In 1854, London, England offered a reward of £1,000 to anyone who could find a cheaper and more abundant substitute for rags as a raw source for paper. A talented mechanic with a gift for invention, John Taylor tested several methods making paper out of wood pulp. The use of wood as a cellulosic feedstock was the first major technological break-through in paper-making in 1,700 years. This advancement dramatically transformed the industry and earned Taylor a place as a pioneer in the technical development of Canada's paper industry.

== Legacy ==
Brothers Thomas Taylor (1813–1880), William Taylor and George Taylor went on to create Toronto Brick. Thomas died April 21, 1880, and George on May 17, 1894. The Taylor family held onto the business until George's son William Taylor sold interest to his Robert T. Davies in 1909.

== Death and legacy ==
John Taylor died unexpectedly on May 13, 1871, at the age of sixty-two. His brothers went on to establish the Don Valley Brick Works in 1889.

The Taylor name lives on in Toronto as the name of a tributary of the city's Don river, called Taylor Creek.
