= Toronto Belt Line Railway =

Railway line in Toronto

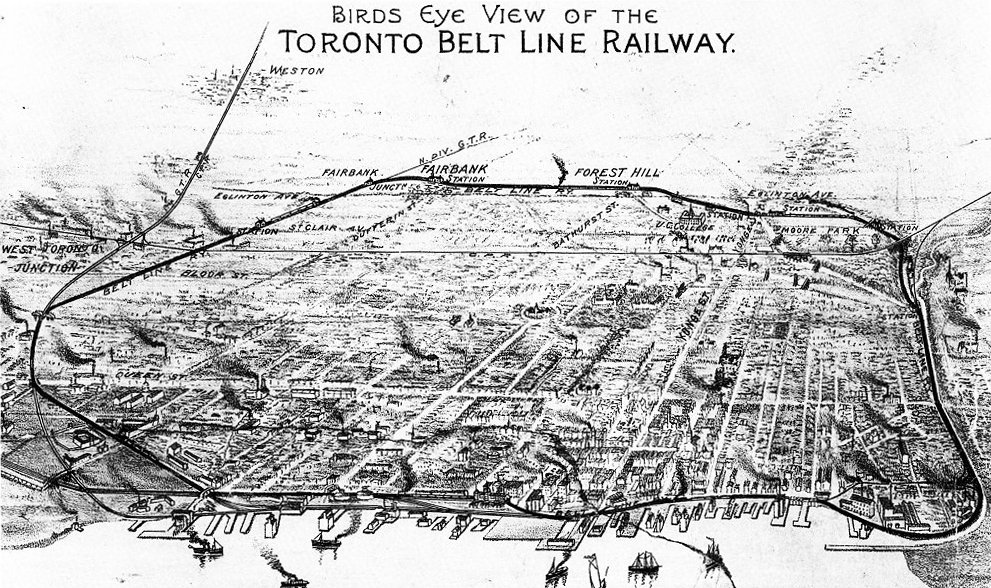

Overview
- Headquarters: Toronto, Ontario, Canada
- Locale: Toronto, Ontario, Canada
- Dates of operation: 1892–1894

Technical
- Track gauge: 4 ft 8 1/2 in (1,435 mm) standard gauge

The Toronto Belt Line Railway was built during the 1890s in Toronto, Ontario, Canada. It consisted of two commuter railway lines to promote and serve new suburban neighbourhoods outside of the limits of the city at the time. Both lines were laid as loops. The longer Don Loop ran north of the city limits, and the shorter Humber Loop ran west of the city limits. The railway was never profitable and ran for only two years. Today, as part of a rails-to-trails project, the Beltline Trail lies on the right-of-way of the Don Loop.

== Routes ==
The railway consisted of two separate loops, both starting and ending at Union Station.

The larger Don Loop went east on the tracks of the Grand Trunk Railway via the Esplanade to the Don River. It then turned north, following the river passing the Don Valley Brick Works on its west side before journeying up a steep grade through the Moore Park Ravine (called "Spring Valley" in Belt Line brochures). It then turned west at the north edge of the Mount Pleasant Cemetery, along Merton Street. At Yonge Street, it turned northwest travelling through Forest Hill until just north of Eglinton Avenue West. There, it turned west again before returning to Union Station via the Grand Trunk Railway line (today's Barrie line) west of Caledonia Road. A complete trip around the Don Loop was approximately 27 km (17 mi).

The smaller Humber Loop headed west along the northwest rail corridor of the Grand Trunk Railway through Parkdale. It turned west just north of St. Clair Avenue and then turned south at Lambton Mills, just east of the Humber River. It ran south following the edge of the Humber River valley. It followed a route paralleled by the South Kingsway just west of High Park. It returned east along Lake Ontario via the tracks of the Toronto, Hamilton and Buffalo Railway. A complete trip around the Humber Loop from and returning to Union Station was approximately 24 km (15 mi).

According to Lyman B. Jackes, there was a spur line north of St. Clair Avenue to link the two loops so that Belt Line trains could operate from one loop to the other. However, according to R. L. Kennedy, such a connection was proposed but never built.

== History ==
Entrepreneur James David Edgar led a group of investors to develop suburban lands and build a railway to service these proposed suburban residential developments. The company would promote properties in Moore Park, Forest Hill, Fairbank and Fairbank Junction, areas along the Belt Line.

As a result of a booming real estate market in the late 1880s, two related companies were founded. The Toronto Belt Land Corporation was incorporated on July 16, 1889, to subdivide and sell land in the new suburbs, and the Toronto Belt Line Railway Company was founded on March 23, 1889, to build a commuter railway to connect these new suburban areas to the city. A pamphlet by the Toronto Belt Land Corporation described the railway's mission as: "to economize time by rapid transit, and to carry men, women and children with comfort, safety and speed beyond the cramped and crowded city to the airy uplands; whence having enjoyed the rest and refreshment of commodious homes and spacious grounds, they can return on the morrow to renew, with quickened energies, the task of life." The railway was to support a suburban lifestyle.

The cost of railway construction was $462,000, much higher than investors had expected. There were also lawsuits over land acquisitions and difficult negotiations with the city over access through the Don Valley. The real estate boom ended before the railway could be completed, which resulted in bankruptcy for the company. The Belt Line was then taken over by the Grand Trunk Railway.

By 1891, 90 workers were building the Don Loop east of Yonge Street and 140 workers to the west. Passenger service first began on July 30, 1892, under the full control of the Grand Trunk Railway. Six trains per day (reduced to three per day in July 1894) were operated in both directions on each of the two loops. The heaviest usage was excursion travel on Sundays. The line used five 4-4-2 tank steam locomotives built at the GTR's Point St. Charles shops. According to an August 1892 article in The Toronto Mail, the passenger coaches resembled an improved version of those used on the New York elevated railway at the time.

The railway ceased on November 17, 1894, after 870 days of passenger service. The railway had never made a profit. There were a number of reasons: the fare prices were too high at the time (5 cents per station to a maximum fare of 25 cents), there were insufficient population and ridership, and the country was experiencing a financial depression in the 1890s. The success of the enterprise depended on the rapid development of suburban properties and a monopoly of transportation service to the developing areas. The drive to develop the new communities was blunted by the depression of 1893, and it took longer to open up the new neighbourhoods than the developers had hoped. Also, electric streetcars of the Toronto Railway Company, along with radial railways such as the Metropolitan Street Railway, were providing more direct routes to downtown.

After passenger trains had stopped operating, parts of the Don Loop sat unused for several years. In 1906, the relatively short section in the Don Valley south of Winchester St. (across from Riverdale Park) was used as part of a new line by the Canadian Northern Railway connecting Toronto to Parry Sound.

In 1910, the Grand Trunk Railway rebuilt the portion of the Don Loop between Fairbank Junction and Mount Pleasant Road for freight service to support the delivery of fuel and building supplies by rail for use in residential areas neighbouring the eastern end of the spur. The tracks on the steep grade (4%) in the Moore Park Ravine were pulled up during World War I because of a shortage of iron.

A 1921 engineering report noted that few sections of the Humber Loop had good track in place. Wooden bridges had deteriorated. Adjacent homeowners had extended their back yards onto the right-of-way. There were municipal seizures because of defaulting on tax payments.

The Grand Trunk Railway went bankrupt in 1923 and became part of Canadian National Railway. The Belt Line was eventually sold on December 31, 1943, to Canadian National Railway (CNR) for $410,000. Three of the five 4-4-2T commuter tank locomotives that had been built especially for the Belt Line were eventually used on the Thousand Islands Railway in Gananoque, Ontario.

Part of the right-of-way of the Humber Loop was used by the Toronto Suburban Railway between 1925 and 1931. The Canadian National Railway used part of the Humber Loop, which became the Lambton Spur, to serve local industries until about 1960–1970, with the final segment from Weston Road to Symes Road closing on February 26, 1980.

In the 1950s, the TTC subway yard at Davisville opened at Yonge Street. The Belt Line spur was used to deliver new subway cars on flat cars to the upper Davisville Yard until the Greenwood Yard opened in 1965.

The service east of Yonge Street bridge was terminated in the 1960s when that bridge was closed. The last commercial organization to use the spur east of Yonge Street was Dominion Coal, whose coal silos were built in 1928. The switch connecting the spur to the unloading siding was removed when the Mount Pleasant bridge over the Belt Line was rebuilt in 1976. The silos were demolished in 2001.

Part of the right-of-way of the Don Loop was expropriated to build the Spadina Expressway, which terminated freight service east of Allen Road to Yonge Street in 1970. That split the remaining spur close to its origin at Caledonia, which was used to service light industry in the Caledonia Road area until about 1988.

In the 1970s, CNR tried to sell the right-of-way of the former Don Loop for housing since the land was quite valuable. Most homeowners adjacent to the line wished to buy the land to extend their backyards. A local citizen, Esther Carin, successfully lobbied city council to turn the section east of Allen Road into a walking trail. The land was purchased by the city in 1972 as part of a land swap with CN that included the Metro Toronto Convention Centre on Front Street. Later, a trail on the west side of the Allen would be established as well. Today, the Beltline Trail is a 9-kilometre (5.6 mi) walking and cycling trail.

== Stations ==
All the stations listed below were used by the Belt Line, but those marked "(TBL)" (and perhaps a few others along other GTR lines) were used exclusively by Belt Line trains.

The stations built for Belt Line passengers were of a standard design with two variations, large and small size. The station size if known is indicated.

None of the stations exist today.

=== Don Loop ===
Here is a list of stations along the Don Loop listed in counterclockwise order. None of the Belt Line stations exists today.

- Union Station (GTR) – located at Station Street; not today's Union Station.
- Church Street on the Esplanade.
- Berkeley Street on the Esplanade.
- Don Station (TBL) – a small station located at the south side of Queen Street on the east side of the tracks; not the same building as the Don railway station opened by the Canadian Pacific Railway later in 1896 to replace the TBL station.
- Winchester Street (TBL)
- Rosedale Station (TBL) – located near today's Bayview Avenue interchange to the Don Valley Parkway and Bloor Street.

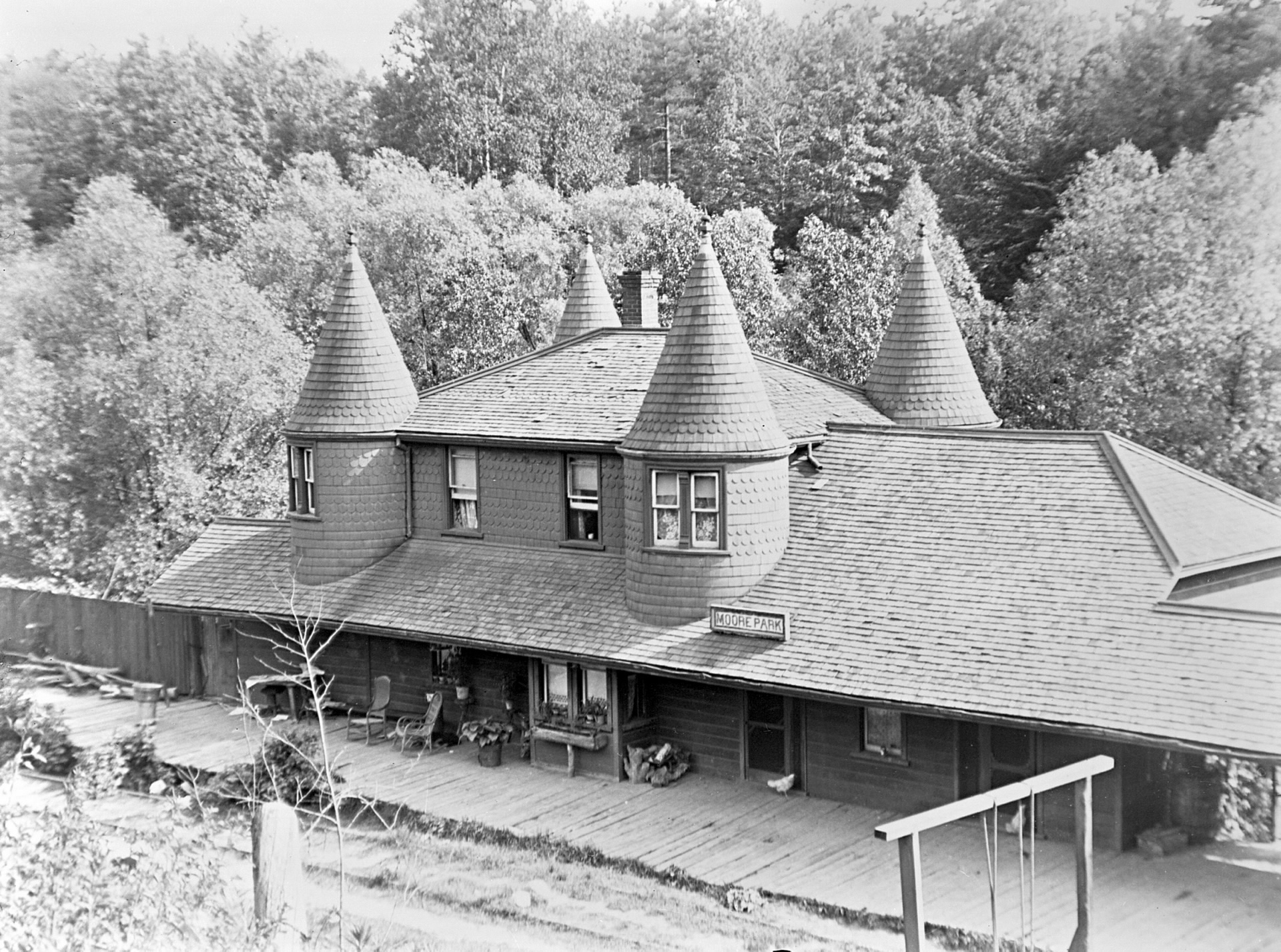
The Moore Park station in 1912

- Moore Park Station (TBL) – located south of Moore Avenue, Moore Park had a large station that was more ornate than the others. John T. Moore, a vice-president of the railway and an owner of property adjacent to the station, paid $300 for the extra ornamentation. Moore Park Station was demolished by 1945.
- Yonge Station (TBL) – located on the east side of Yonge Street at Merton Street; also called the Merton Street Station in some sources.
- Upper Canada College Station (TBL) – a small station located near Avenue Road between Upper Canada College and Eglinton Avenue.
- Eglinton Station (TBL) – located on the south side of Eglinton Avenue east of Spadina Road below the bridge crossing.
- Forest Hill Station (TBL) – located west of Bathurst Street.
- Fairbank Station (TBL) – located at Dufferin Street.
- Fairbank Junction – where the Belt Line joined the Grand Trunk Railway line.
- Unknown station at St. Clair.
- Unknown Station at connection with CPR.
- Spadina Avenue

=== Humber Loop ===
Here is what is probably a partial list of stations used by the Humber Loop.

- Parkdale – located at Queen Street.
- West Toronto
- St. Clair (TBL) – large station located west of Jane Street at the point north of St. Clair Avenue where the line bends entering/leaving the Humber River valley.
- Swansea (TBL) – located near where the Humber River flows into Lake Ontario.
- Sunnyside

== Bridges ==
Here is a list of bridges along the Don Loop in counterclockwise order. The linked photos come from the City of Toronto Archives.

- Winchester Street Bridge: The railway passed by the west end of the bridge crossing Winchester Street at grade. The ridge was later removed, and Winchester Street no longer meets this section.
- Clarence Avenue/Heath Street bridge with railway running beneath the bridge over the ravine. The wooden bridge was condemned as unsafe by 1951 and has since been replaced. A newer steel truss pedestrian bridge now crosses the ravine.
- Mount Pleasant Road bridge, railway underpass near Merton Avenue.
- Moore Avenue bridge, railway underpass.
- Yonge Street bridge at Davisville Village, railway overpass (steel girder on masonry structure) over Yonge Street and the tracks of the electric Metropolitan Street Railway. The bridge still exists for trail users.
- Dufferin Street bridge, railway overpass. The bridge remains in place for trail users.

== See also ==
- List of Ontario railways
- List of defunct Canadian railways

== Bibliography ==
- Akler, H., and S.B. Hood. 2003. Toronto, the Unknown City. Arsenal Pulp Press. ISBN 1-55152-146-6
- Russell, C.H. 1996. Tightening the belt: a history of the Toronto Belt Line Railway. Box 207158, Folio 1. City of Toronto Archives
- Sauriol, Charles. 1981. Remembering the Don: A Rare Record of Earlier Times Within the Don River Valley. Consolidated Amethyst Communications. ISBN 0-920474-22-5
