= Mud Creek (Toronto) =

Stream in Toronto, Canada

Coordinates: 43.6927952°N 79.3766196°W

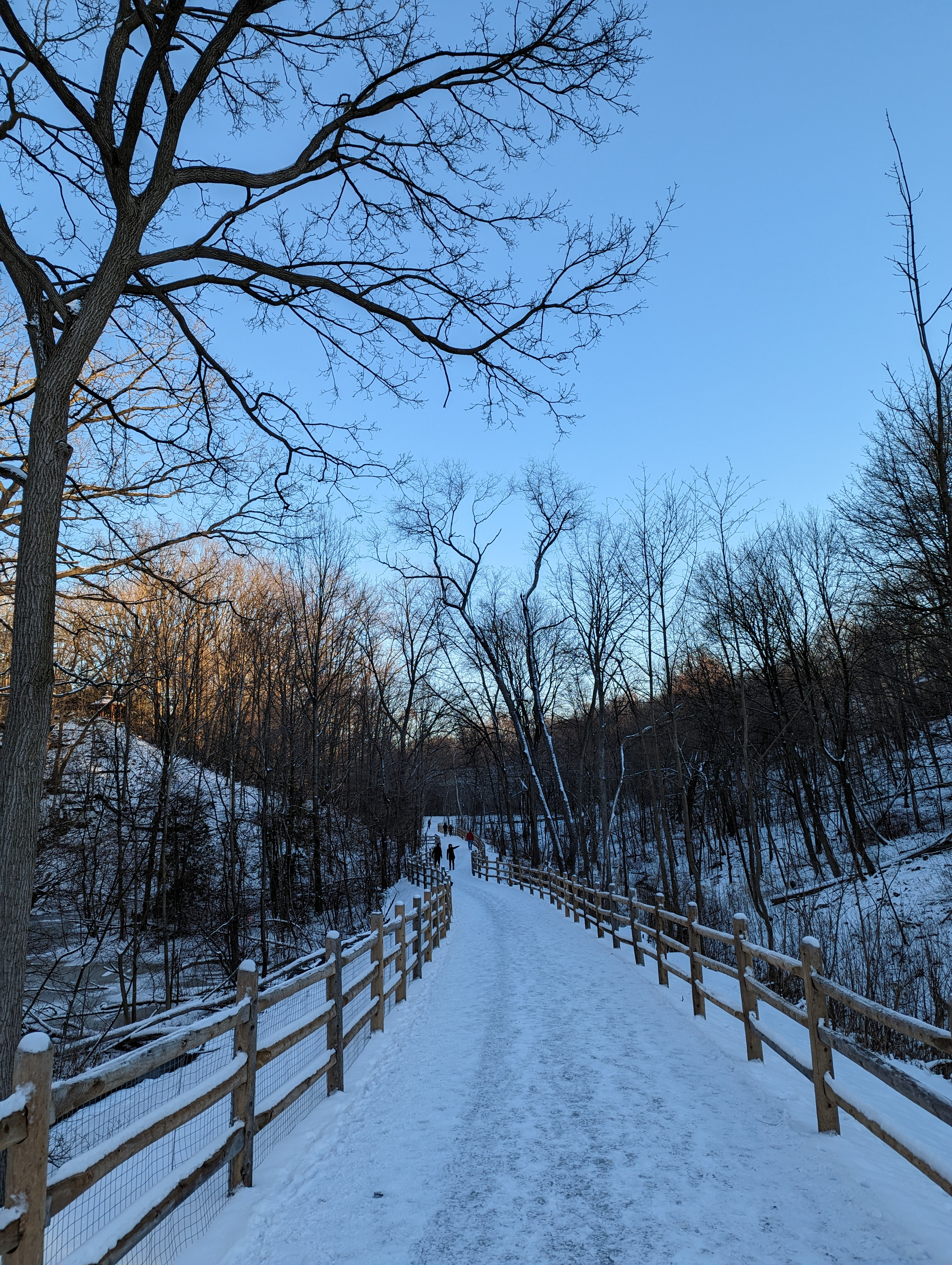
- Moore Park Ravine trail in January 2023

Location
- Country: Canada
- Province: Ontario
- City: Toronto

Physical characteristics
- Source
  - location: Toronto, Ontario, Canada
- Mouth
  - location: Don River, just south of Don Valley Brick Works, Toronto, Ontario, Canada
  - elevation: 84 m (276 ft)
- Length: 11.5 km (7.1 mi)

Mud Creek is a mostly buried south-easterly tributary of the Don River in Toronto, Ontario, Canada. It has also been known at different times as Mount Pleasant Brook and Spring Valley Creek.

At its full former reach, the source of Mud Creek began near Downsview Airport, from which the creek flowed approximately 11.5km southeast to its mouth at the Don River. Now considered one of Toronto's lost rivers, much of the creek is now buried, with the sole surface portions visible consisting of a 2.1km stretch starting from Moore Park Ravine at the Moore Park neighbourhood to the Don River. However, with positive results of recent conservation efforts, it is also brought forward as a success story for good ravine management.

== Former reach ==
The former path of Mud Creek can still be seen in the geography from the Downsview neighbourhood, to Mount Pleasant Cemetery, and into the depression at the beginning of Moore Park Ravine. However, almost all of the former reach of Mud Creek was buried. The source was believed to be near Downsview Airport where it flowed towards the intersection of Champlain Boulevard and Highway 401.

From there it crossed into the present-day location of the Baycrest Medical Center parking lot and flowed south to around Ranee Avenue and Ridgevale Drive and then through a greenbelt that is now Woburn Park. Crossing Lawrence Avenue, it flowed into the present day Caribou Park and then followed the southeast curve of Coldstream Avenue, where flow from the local catchment is briefly visible in the Kimbark-Coldstream Ravine until it enters the sewers and is diverted east. From the ravine, the former Mud Creek travelled south east, crossing Avenue Road into Lytton Park and then flowed south following the path of Rosewell Avenue into Eglinton Park.

The creek exited the southeast corner of the Eglinton Park near Edith street, where the former presence of Mud Creek is still felt by local residents from the high soil water-table. From the park, it then travelled southeast crossing Yonge Street at Hillsdale Avenue. From there, Mud Creek flowed through what is now paved over as Tulis Drive, past the southwest corner of June Rowlands Park and into Mount Pleasant Cemetery at the Mount Pleasant Road, where the high water-table present even today waters a small wetland garden. The waters from the former creek then flowed southeast to exit into Moore Park Ravine.

== Surface section ==
The sole remaining section of Mud Creek that flows is the open section south of Moore Avenue, starting at the Moore Park Ravine. Much of the water flowing in this surface portion of Mud Creek is not from its former or local watershed; rather, it is diverted from the Forman and Bayview Avenue storm sewers located northeast of the ravine, which drains the Upper Cudmore Creek watershed. The open section of Mud Creek runs 2.1km to the Don River, mostly adjacent to the Beltline Trail where it is buried for short stretches as it is repeatedly diverted to opposite sides of the trail before finally emerging through the Don Valley Brick Works.

=== Moore Park Ravine ===
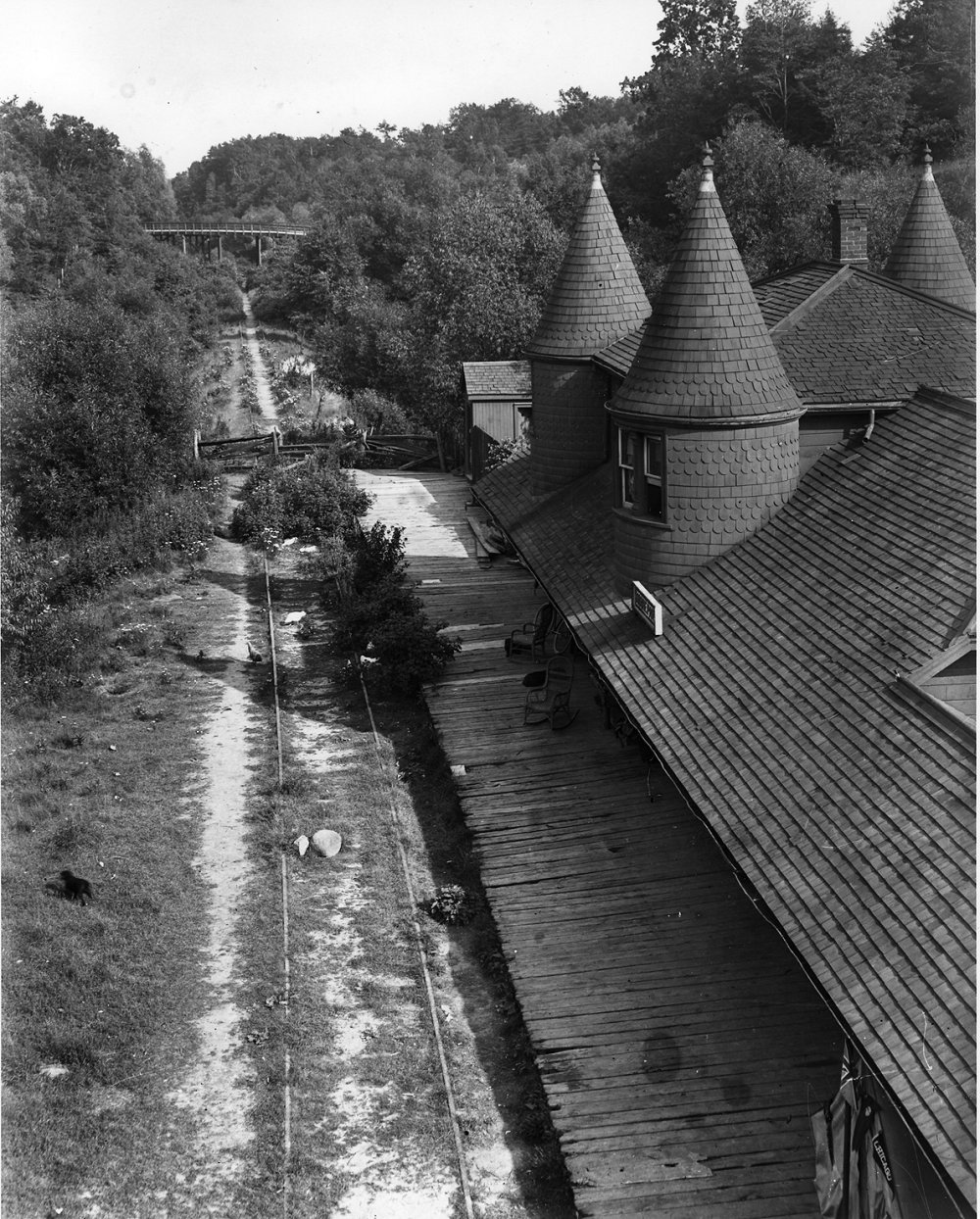
Mud Creek ran next to Moore Park station of the Toronto Belt Line Railway.

Moore Park Ravine begins just south of Moore Avenue and ends with the open space of the Don River valley. Adjoining Mount Pleasant Cemetery, the first portion of the ravine from Moore Avenue to Heath Street (c. 1890s Clarence Avenue) was known as Spring Valley and was marketed by the Toronto Belt Line Railway Company as such with the name also applied to the creek.

The creek and the ravine is considered one of the best nature walks in Toronto.

=== Don Valley Brick Works ===
The creek enters into the Don River valley at the Don Valley Brick Works, where its flow bifurcates through or adjacent to the ponds, and then re-converges shortly before exiting into the Don River south of Bayview Avenue. The ponds serve to hold and provide biological filtration for the inflow from Mud Creek prior to discharge into the Don River, and is part of Toronto's storm-water management strategy. Due to the geology and depth of the ravine, erosion and foresting work has been ongoing to preserve its integrity as well as the Beltline Trail that runs through it.

== Popular references ==
A pivotal scene in Margaret Atwood's novel Cat's Eye was set in Mud Creek near the Heath Street footbridge, where the protagonist describes wading into it:

The water of the creek is cold and peaceful, it comes straight from the cemetery, from the graves and their bones.

— Margaret Atwood, Cat's Eye, 1988
