= Loring-Wyle Parkette =

Public park in Toronto, Ontario, Canada

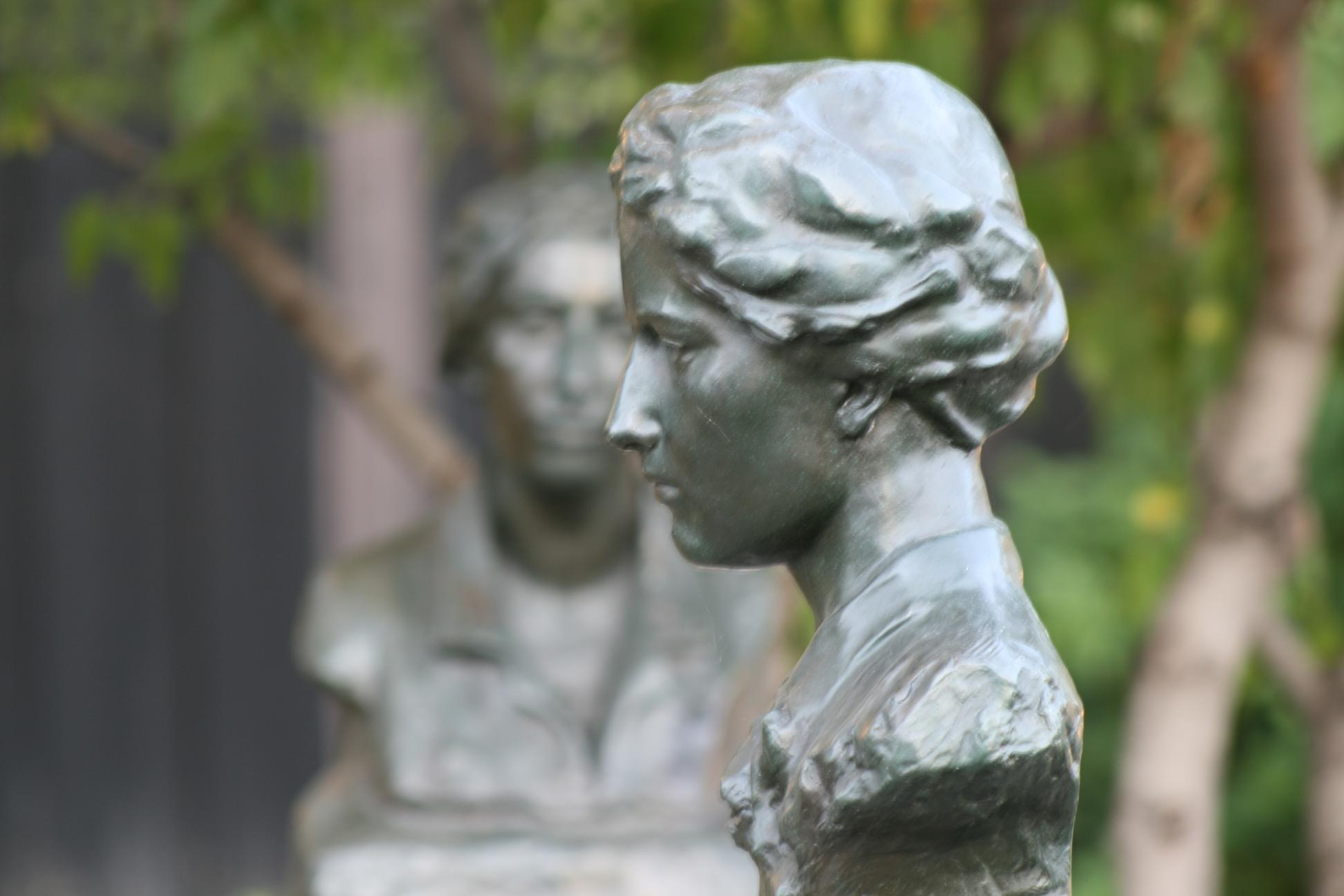
- A sculpture in Loring-Wyle Parkette
- Interactive map of Loring-Wyle Parkette
- Type: Public Park
- Location: 276 St. Clair Avenue East; Toronto, Ontario
- Coordinates: 43°41′26″N 79°22′59.5″W
- Created: 1984
- Operator: Toronto Parks

Loring-Wyle Parkette is a small plot of land, on the northeast corner of the Mount Pleasant Road and St. Clair Avenue East intersection in Toronto's Moore Park neighbourhood, dedicated to the art and memory of two famous Toronto sculptors: Frances Loring (1887–1968) and Florence Wyle (1881–1968). Until October 1976, the long, narrow property served as the Moore Park Loop turnaround for the Toronto Transit Commission's Mount Pleasant streetcar.

The parkette, established in 1984 at the request of the Moore Park Residents' Association, is located one block north of the converted church schoolhouse at 110 Glenrose Avenue that served as the artists' studio. The parkette contains busts of both women, each modeled by the other. In addition, there are two sculptures done by Wyle: Young Girl (1938) and Harvester (1940).

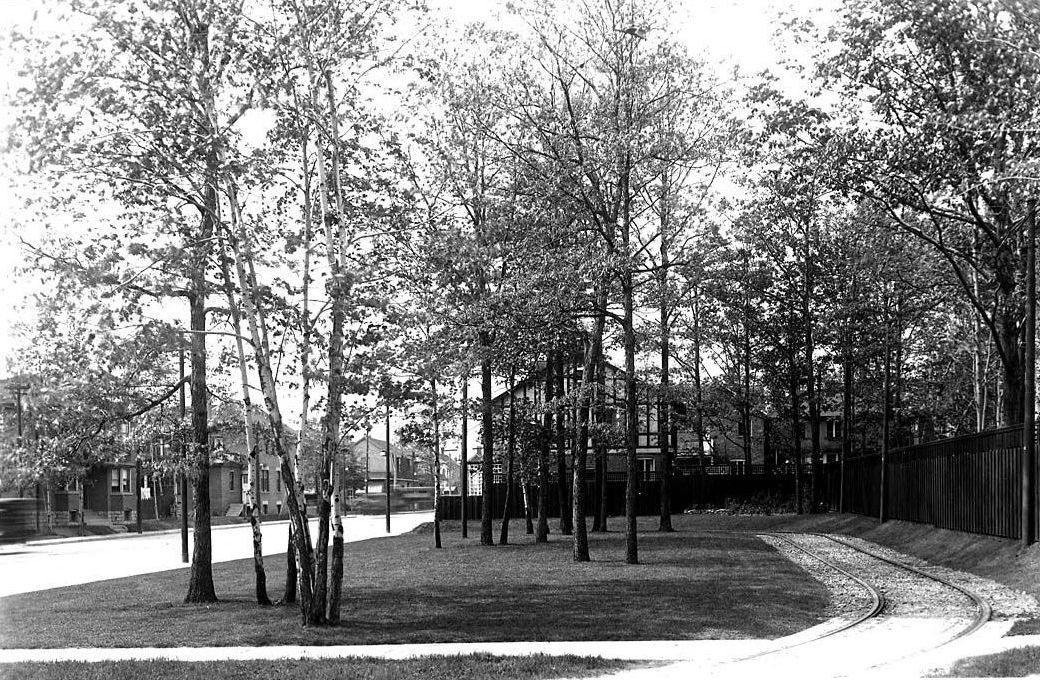
Moore Park Loop in 1926

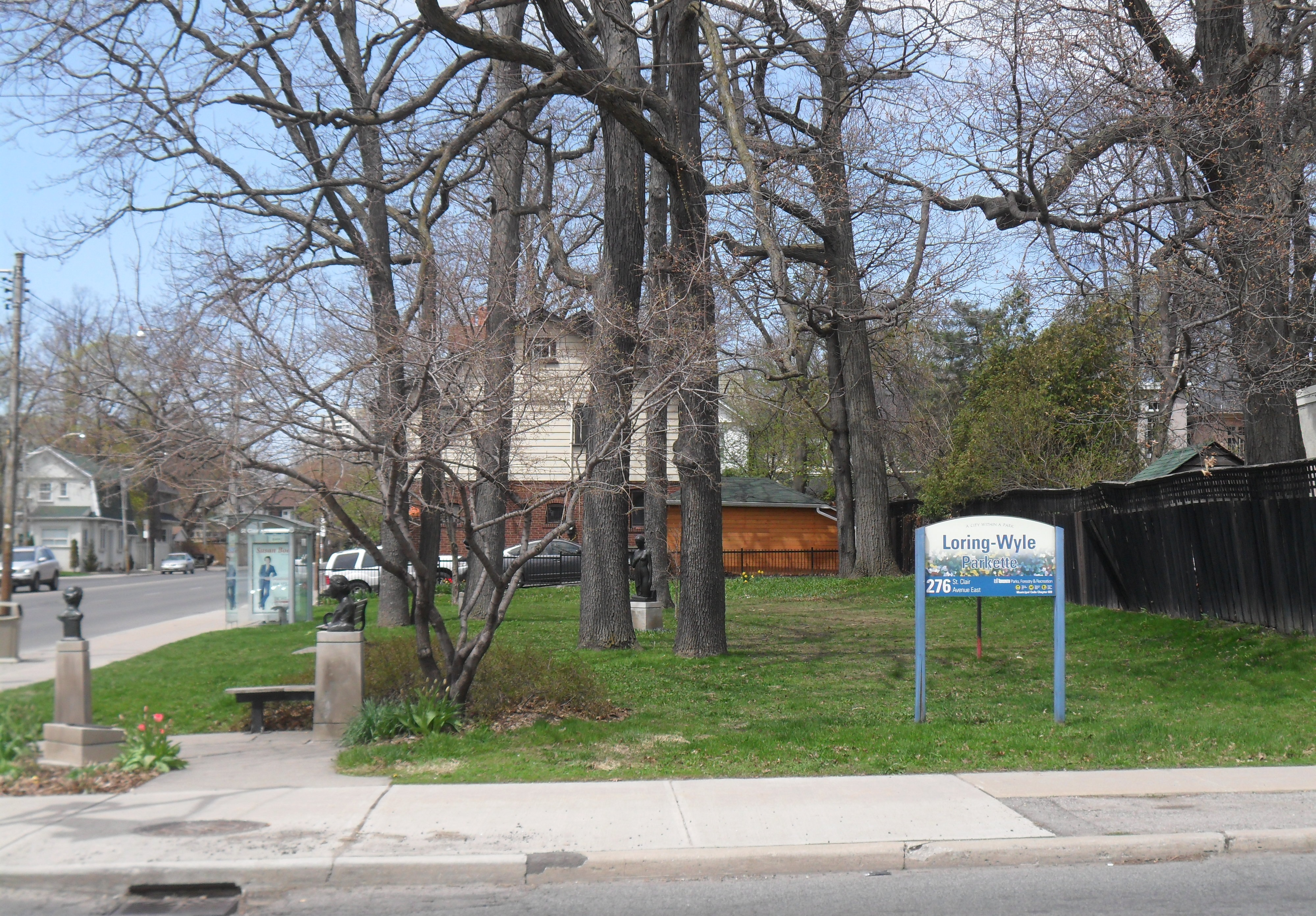
Loring-Wyle Parkette in 2014

== Gallery of sculptures ==
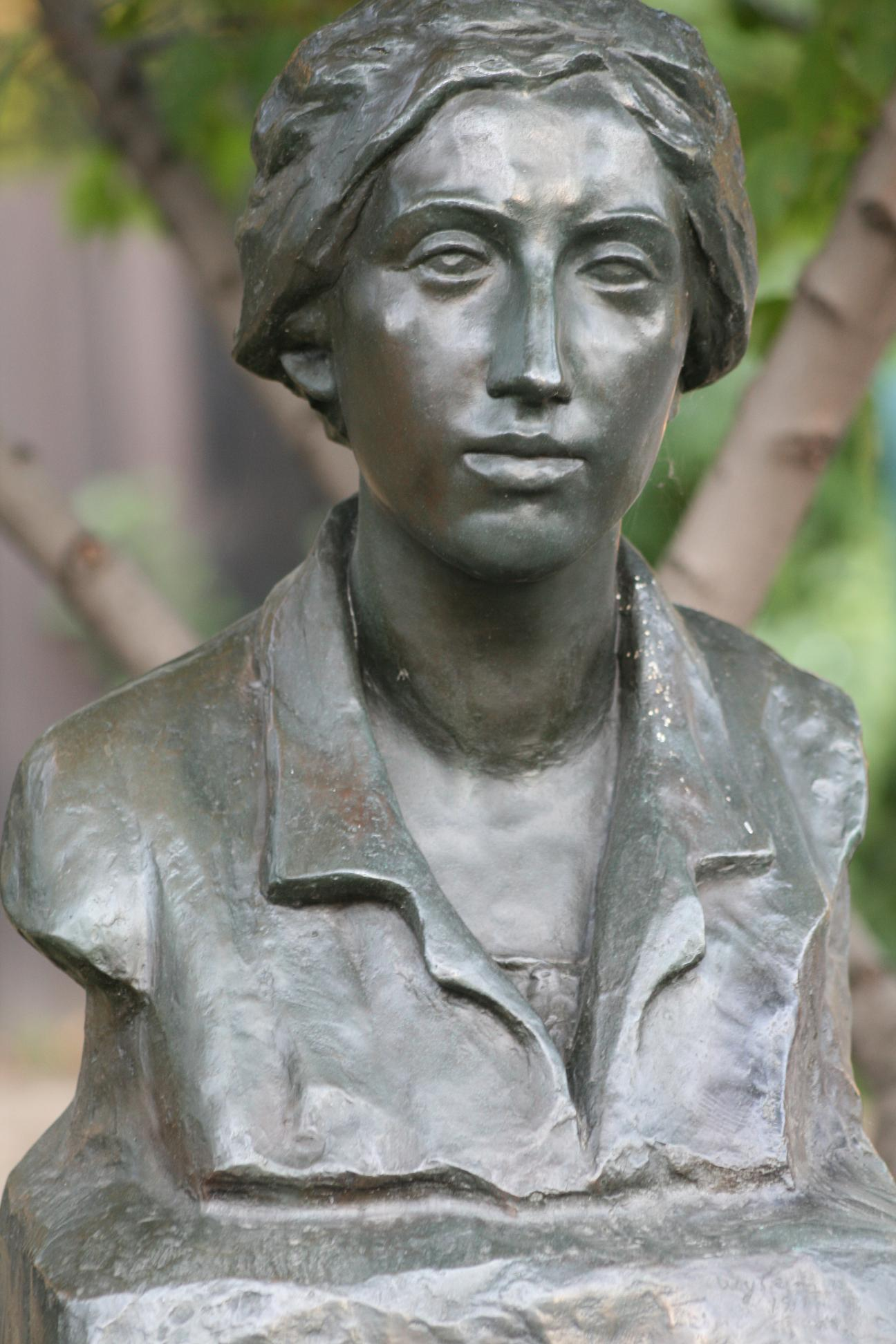
Loring by Wyle (1914)

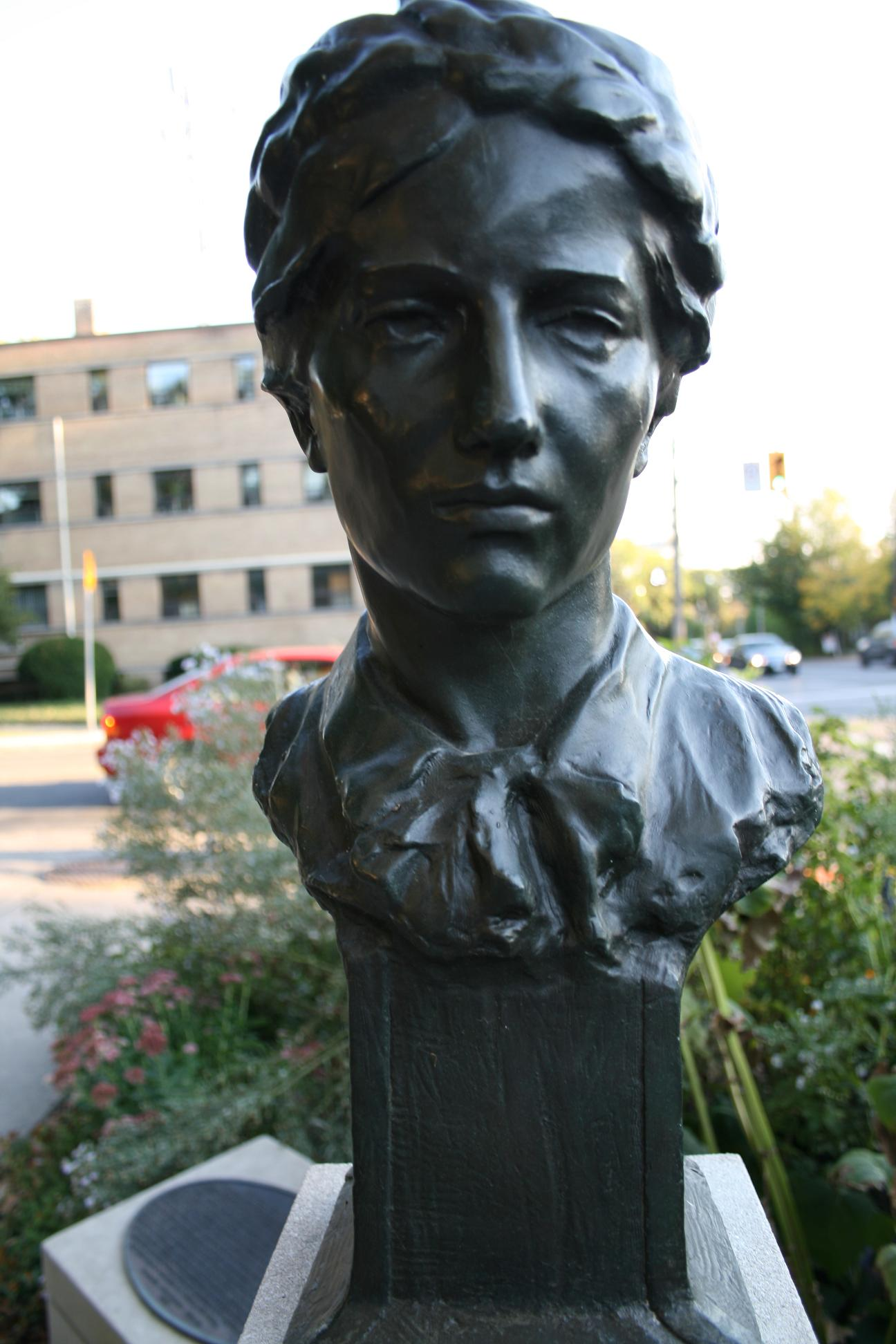
Wyle by Loring (1914)

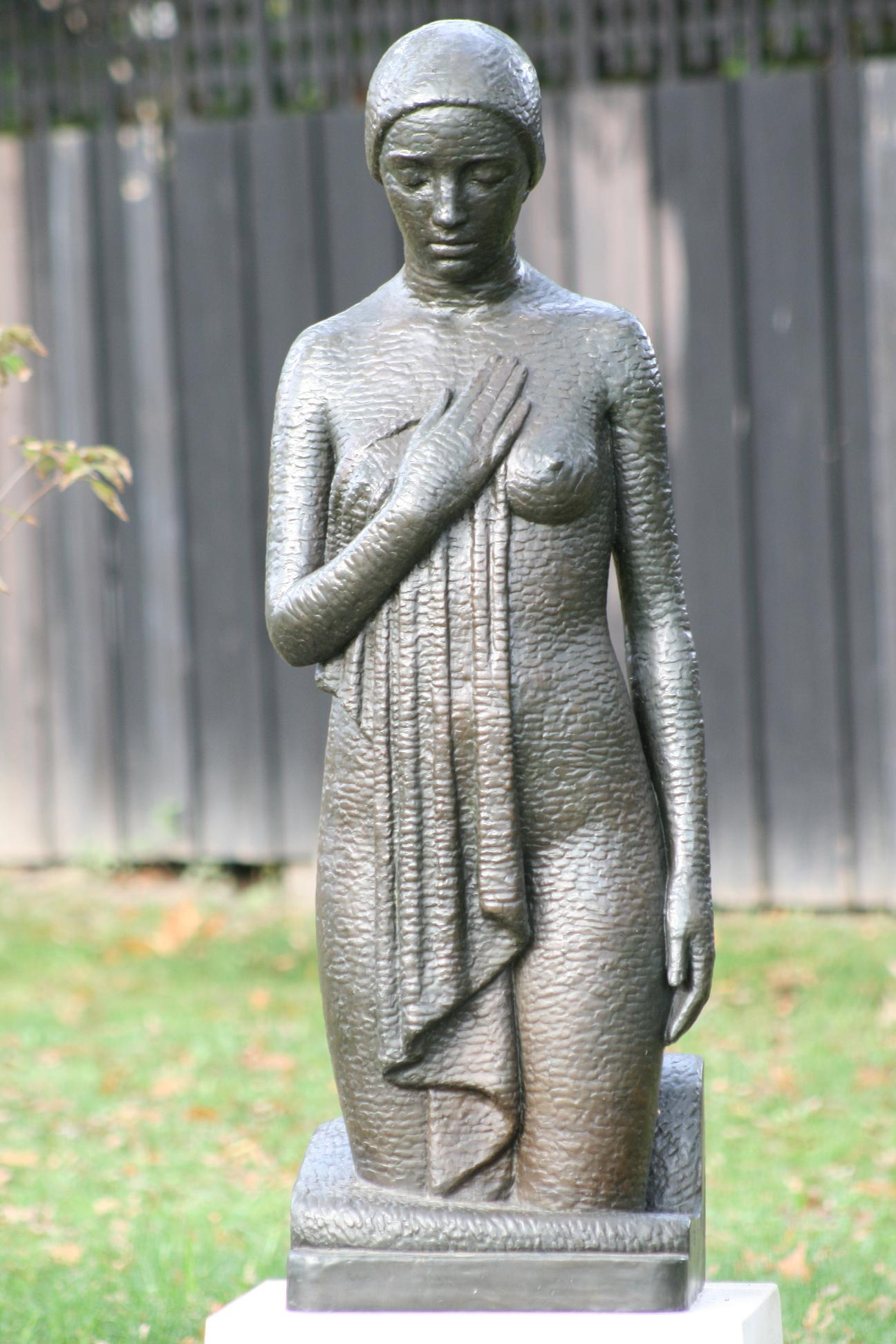
Young Girl by Florence Wyle (1938)

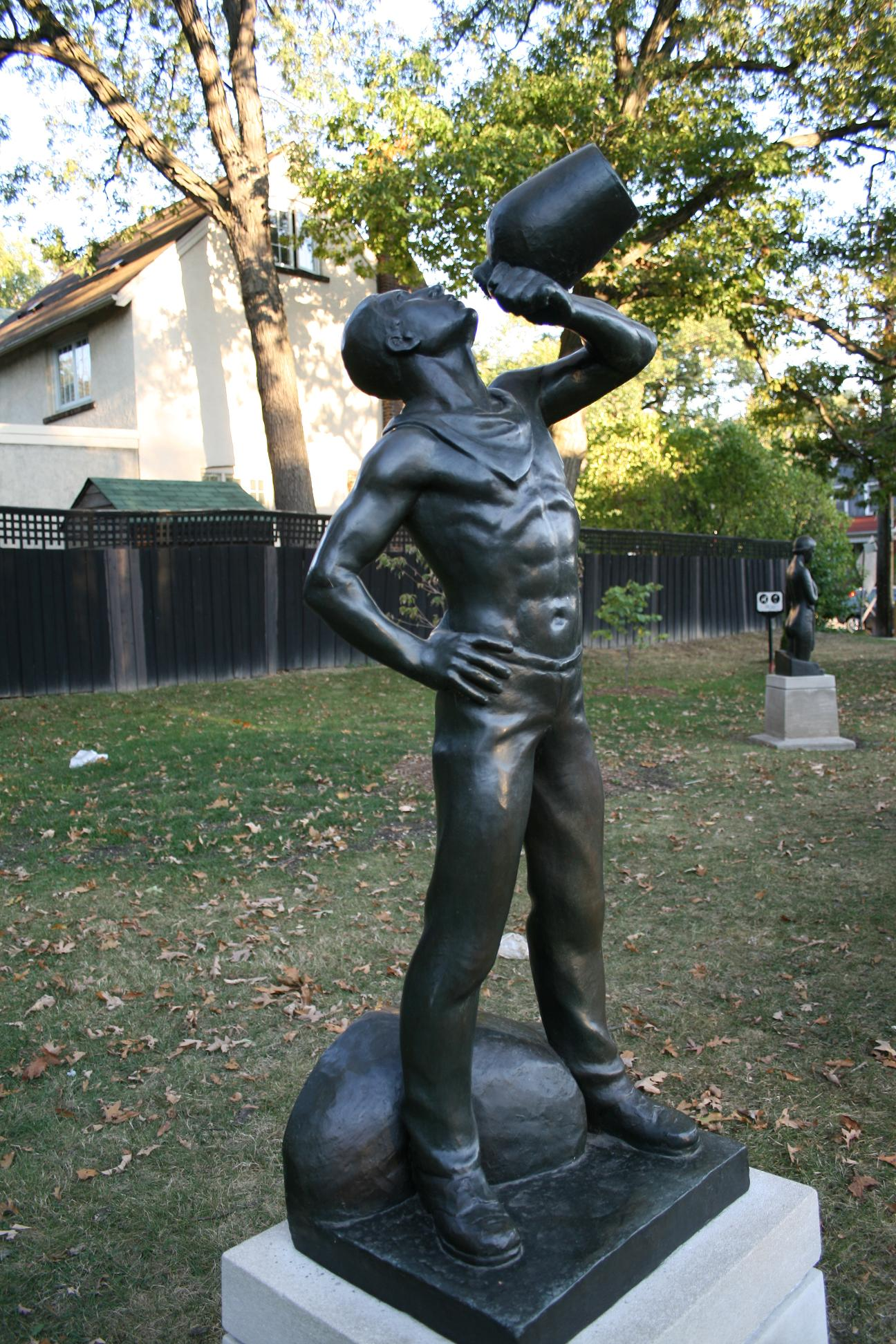
Harvester by Florence Wyle (1940)

== See also ==
- List of Toronto parks
- Queen Elizabeth Way Monument
- Toronto Sculpture Garden
