= Moore Park, Toronto =

Moore Park
- Neighbourhood
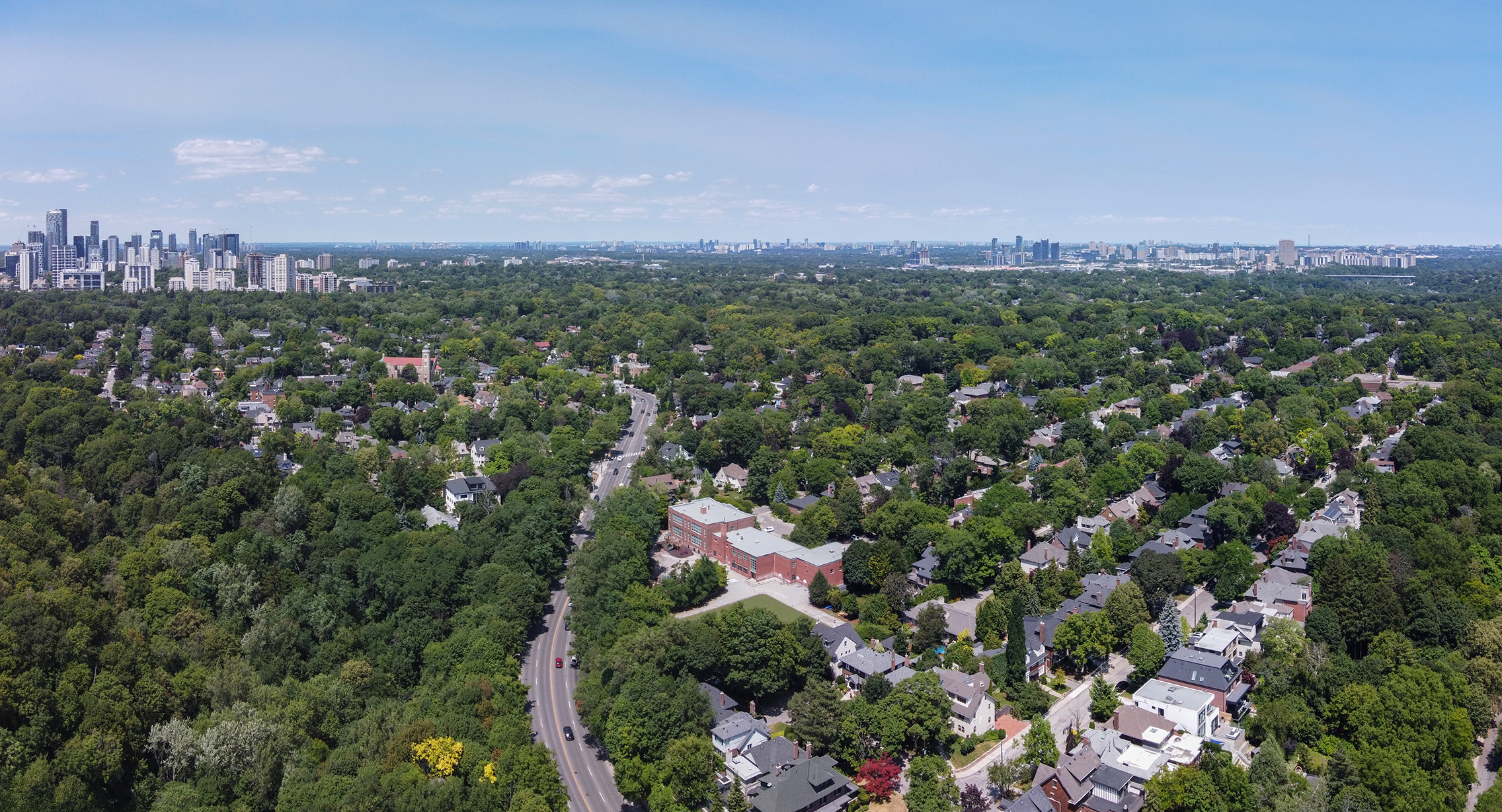
- Aerial view of Moore Park in 2025

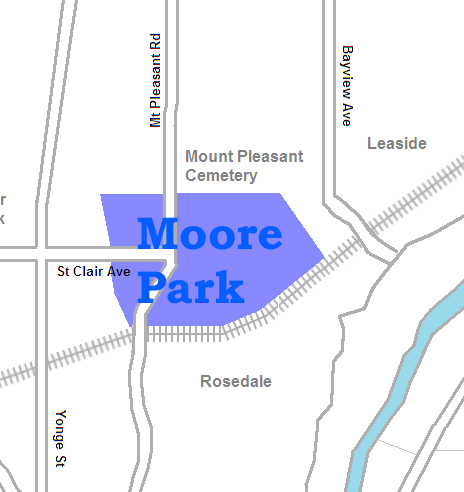
- Vicinity

- Location within Toronto
- Coordinates: 43.691°N 79.377°W
- Country: Canada
- Province: Ontario
- City: Toronto
- Established: 1792 York County
- Township: 1793 York Township
- Annexed: 1912 Toronto

Moore Park is a neighbourhood in Toronto, Ontario, Canada. It lies along both sides of St. Clair Avenue East between the Vale of Avoca ravine and Moore Park ravine (formerly Spring Valley ravine). The northern boundary is Mount Pleasant Cemetery and the southern the Canadian Pacific Railway tracks.

The neighbourhood takes its name from its developer, John T. Moore. To encourage buyers, he built two bridges in 1891: the original steel bridge on St. Clair over the Vale of Avoca, and the original wooden bridge on Moore Avenue over Spring Valley ravine. He also helped establish railway service to the neighbourhood, overseeing the connection of the area to the Toronto Belt Line Railway, a commuter railway. The development was marketed to the wealthy, and the neighbourhood remains wealthy. Moore Park was annexed by the City of Toronto on December 16, 1912.

Census tract 0125.00 of the 2021 Canadian census covers Moore Park. Average income is CA$258,000, one of the highest incomes of all Toronto neighbourhoods. The neighbourhood’s average income is comparable, if not higher than parts of neighbouring Rosedale.

== Education ==
=== Public ===
- Bennington Heights Elementary School
- Our Lady of Perpetual Help Separate School
- Whitney Jr. Public School

=== Private ===
- Gradale Academy

== See also ==
- Loring-Wyle Parkette
- Lytton Park
