= List of Anglican churches in Toronto =

There are just over eighty Anglican churches in the city of Toronto, Ontario, Canada. Toronto is in the Anglican Diocese of Toronto, which includes the city of Toronto and much of south central Ontario. The eastern part of Toronto is part of the York-Scarborough episcopal area while the western half of the city is in the York-Credit Valley, which also includes Mississauga and Peel. The city is further divided into nine deaneries.

== Active congregations ==
Congregation	Location	Year Founded	Notes	Image
All Saints Anglican Church, Kingsway	The Kingsway	1944		
All Saints Anglican Church, Sherbourne	Cabbagetown	1951		
Ascension Church, Don Mills	Don Mills	1956		
Atonement Anglican Church, Alderwood	Alderwood	1924		
Christ Church Deer Park	Deer Park	1870		
Christ Church, Scarborough	Scarborough Village	1845		
Christ Church St. James	Mimico	2010	Formed by the merger of Christ Church, Mimico and St. James, Humber Bay.	
Christ the King Anglican Church	Etobicoke	1959		
Epiphany and St. Mark, Parkdale	Parkdale	1983	Formed by the merger of the Church of the Epiphany and the Church of St. Mark, Parkdale. Congregation meets in the former St. Mark's parish church.	
Flemingdon Park Ministry Anglican Chapel	Flemingdon Park	1980s	Anglican administered living and work community.	
Grace Church, Scarborough	Scarborough Junction	2011	Formed by the merger of Epiphany, Scarborough; St. Crispin; St. George, Scarborough; and St. Giles. Congregation meets at the redeveloped site of St. Giles.	
Grace Church on-the-Hill	Forest Hill	1874		
Holy Trinity Anglican Church, Guildwood	Guildwood	1961		
Holy Trinity Anglican Church	Financial District	1847		
Church of the Holy Wisdom	Bendale	2022	Formed by the merger St. Peter's (Scarborough); St. John the Divine (Scarborough); and St. Ninian's.	
Incarnation Anglican Church	Willowdale	2005	Formed by the merger of Annunciation and All Souls.	
Little Trinity Anglican Church	Corktown	1843	Oldest surviving church building in Toronto. Follows the Evangelical Anglicanism tradition.	
Church of the Messiah	Summerhill	1891		
Mission to Seafarers Anglican Chapel	Toronto Harbour	19th century	Anglican ministry to port workers and sailors.	
The Church of the Nativity, Malvern	Malvern	1974	Principally serves the Caribbean and African Anglican community.	
Our Saviour Anglican Church	Don Mills	1961		
Parroquia San Esteban Anglican Church	Financial District	2013	Principally serves the Latin American and Spanish speaking Anglican community. Congregation meets at Holy Trinity Anglican Church.	
Church of the Redeemer	Yorkville	1871		
Church of the Resurrection Anglican Church	Woodbine Heights	1922		
San Lorenzo - Dufferin Anglican Church	Glen Park	1990s	Principally serves the Latin American and Spanish speaking Anglican community.	
San Lorenzo Ruiz Anglican Church	St. James Town	1991	Principally serves the Filipino Anglican community. Congregation meets at the Church of St. Peter and St. Simon the Apostle.	
Sisterhood of St. John the Divine Anglican Chapel	Newtonbrook	1884	Home to a community of nuns of the Sisterhood of St. John the Divine.	
St. Aidan Anglican Church	The Beaches	1880		
St. Andrew-by-the-Lake Church	Toronto Islands	1884	Only church on the Toronto Islands.	
St. Andrew Anglican Church, Scarborough	Maryvale	1956		
St. Anne Anglican Church	Brockton Village	1862	Church building (completed in 1908) severely damaged by fire in 2024.	
St. Augustine of Canterbury Anglican Church	Leaside	1946		
St. Barnabas Anglican Church, Chester	The Danforth	1858		
St. Bartholomew's, Regent Park	Regent Park	1873	Follows the Anglo-Catholic tradition.	
St. Bede Anglican Church	Clairlea	1924	English Anglican Church community.	
St. Chad Anglican Church	Earlscourt	1930		
St. Clement's Church	Yonge and Eglinton	1891	Parish oversees St. Clement's School.	
St. Columba and All Hallows Anglican Church	O'Connor-Parkview	1990	Formed by the merger of St. Columba and All Hallows parishes.	
St. Christopher's Chinese Anglican Church	Don Valley Village	1996	Principally serves the Chinese Anglican community. Congregation meets at St. Cyprian Anglican Church.	
St. Cuthbert Anglican Church	Leaside	1890		
St. Cyprian Anglican Church	Don Valley Village	1965	Since 1970 has shared a building, known as "Tri-Church," with Iona Presbyterian Church and St. Christopher's Chinese Anglican Church.	
St. David, Donlands and St. Andrew, Japanese	The Danforth	1912		
St. Dunstan of Canterbury Anglican Church	Port Union	1925		
St. George by the Grange Anglican Church	Grange Park	2024	Originally founded St. George the Martyr (1844–2017), it was re-established in 2024 and is currently administered as a church plant by St. Paul's, Bloor Street.	
St. George's-on-the-Hill	Etobicoke	1844		
St. George on Yonge Anglican Church	Willowdale	1930		
St. Hilda Anglican Church, Fairbank	Fairbank	1890	Founded as a mission of Christ Church Deer Park.	
St. James Cathedral	Old Town	1797	Cathedral of the Anglican Diocese of Toronto, and oldest congregation in the city.	
St. John the Baptist, Norway	The Beaches	1853		
St. John's, York Mills	York Mills	1816	Second oldest Anglican parish in York County.	
St. Jude Anglican Church, Wexford	Wexford	1848		
St. Luke Anglican Church, East York	Old East York	1870	Originally located at Bay and St. Joseph Streets, moved east in 1930s.	
St. Margaret in-the-Pines Anglican Church	West Hill	1833	First Anglican church built in Scarborough.	
St. Margaret Anglican Church, New Toronto	New Toronto	1906		
St. Mark and Calvary Anglican Church	Corso d'Italia	1970	Formed by the merger of St. Mark's and Calvary churches.	
St. Martin-in-the-Fields Anglican Church	High Park North	1890	Follows the Anglo-Catholic tradition.	
St. Mary and St. Martha	Weston	2015	Formed by the merger of St. David, Lawrence Avenue (Amesbury); Church of the Advent (Runnymede); Church of the Good Shepherd (Weston); and St. John, Weston.	
St. Mary Magdalene Anglican Church	Palmerston-Little Italy	1888	Follows the Anglo-Catholic tradition.	
St. Matthew the Apostle Anglican Church, Oriole	Henry Farm	1964		
St. Matthew Anglican Church, First Avenue	Riverdale	1876		
St. Matthew Anglican Church, Islington	Islington	1948		
St. Matthias Bellwoods	Trinity-Bellwoods	1873	Follows the Anglo-Catholic tradition.	
St. Matthias Anglican Church, Etobicoke	Richview	1923		
St. Michael and All Angels Anglican Church	Humewood-Cedarvale	1907		
St. Michael the Archangel Anglican Church, Scarborough	Milliken	1979		
St. Monica's Anglican Church	The Beaches	1907	Congregation meets at St. John the Baptist Norway.	
St. Nicholas Anglican Church, Birch Cliff	Birch Cliff	1912		
St. Olave Anglican Church, Swansea	Swansea	1886		
St. Paul the Apostle Anglican Church, Rexdale	Rexdale	1955		
St. Paul's, Bloor Street	Church and Wellesley	1860	Largest church in the Diocese of Toronto. Parent church to St. George by the Grange.	
St. Paul Anglican Church, L'Amoreaux	L'Amoreaux	1841		
St. Paul Anglican Church, Runnymede	Runnymede	1909		
Church of St. Peter and St. Simon the Apostle	St. James Town	2016	Formed by the merger of St. Peter, Carlton Street and St. Simon the Apostle.	
St. Philip Anglican Church, Etobicoke	Humber Heights	1828		
St. Saviour Anglican Church	Upper Beaches	1891		
St. Stephen-in-the-Fields Anglican Church	Kensington Market	1857		
St. Stephen Anglican Church, Downsview	Downsview	1954	Principally serves the Caribbean and African Anglican community.	
St. Theodore of Canterbury Anglican Church	Newtonbrook	1961		
St. Thomas's Anglican Church	University of Toronto	1874	Follows the Anglo-Catholic tradition.	
St. Timothy Anglican Church, Agincourt	Agincourt	1911		
St. Timothy Anglican Church, North Toronto	Bedford Park	1930s		
Transfiguration Anglican Church	Davisville	1921		

== Former churches ==
Congregation	Location	Dates	Notes	Image
Advent Anglican Church	Runnymede	1911-2015	Merged to form the parish of St. Mary and St. Martha.	
All Souls Church	Lansing	1951–2005	Merged to form the Church of the Incarnation.	
Annunciation Church	Lansing	1949–2005	Merged to form the Church of the Incarnation.	
Apostles Anglican Church	Wilson Heights	1955-2012	Closed.	
Ascension Church	Downtown	1875-1933	Building demolished in 1933, congregation later continued as an independent Anglican church.	
Calvary Anglican Church	Silverthorn	1924-1970	Merged with St. Mark's. Building now home to St. George's Romanian Orthodox Church.	
Christ Church, Mimico	Mimico	1832–2006	Third Church on site rebuilt in 1953. Destroyed by an arsonist's fire in 2006. Congregation merged to form Christ Church St. James.	
Epiphany Anglican Church, Scarborough	Scarborough Junction	1914-2011	Merged to form Grace Church, Scarborough.	
Good Shepherd Anglican Church, Weston	Weston	1911-2015	Founded as a mission of St. John's Weston. Merged to form the parish of St. Mary and St. Martha.	
Cathedral of St. Alban the Martyr	Seaton Village	1883–1964	Originally intended to be the Anglican cathedral of Toronto, but was never completed. Presently serves as the school chapel of the Anglican administered Royal St. George's College.	
St. Crispin Anglican Church	Cliffside	1922-2011	Merged to form Grace Church, Scarborough. Former church is now the St. Nicholas Orthodox Cathedral of the Holy Orthodox Church in North America.	
St. David Anglican Church, Lawrence Avenue	Amesbury	1923-2015	Merged to form the parish of St. Mary and St. Martha.	
St. George Anglican Church, Scarborough	Scarborough Bluffs	1952-2011	Merged to form Grace Church, Scarborough.	
St. Giles Anglican Church, Scarborough	Scarborough Junction	1959-2011	Merged to form Grace Church, Scarborough, which was built on its former site.	
St. James, Humber Bay	Etobicoke	1891-2010	Merged with Christ Church, Mimico to form Christ Church St. James	
Church of St. John the Evangelist	Fashion District	1858–1962	Built to serve the Fort York garrison. Building demolished in 1962.	
St. John the Divine Anglican Church, Scarborough	Woburn	1952-2022	Merged to form Church of the Holy Wisdom.	
St. John Anglican Church, West Toronto	High Park North	1923-2024	Closed.	
St. John Anglican Church, Weston	Weston	1856-2015	Merged to form St. Mary and St. Martha.	
St. Leonard Anglican Church	Bedford Park	1908-2023	Closed.	
St. Margaret Anglican Church, North Toronto	Allenby	1944-2009	Merged into St. Clement's Church.	
St. Ninian Anglican Church, Scarborough	Bendale	1960s-2022	Merged to form Church of the Holy Wisdom.	
St. Peter Anglican Church, Carlton Street.	Cabbagetown	1853-2016	Merged to form St. Peter and St. Simon the Apostle.	
St. Peter Anglican Church, Scarborough	Bendale	1955-2022	Merged to form Church of the Holy Wisdom.	
St. Philip-the-Apostle Anglican Church	North York	1875-2010	Closed. Located at Dundas and Spadina 1875–1942.	
St. Richard of Chichester	Etobicoke	1958-2003	Closed. Building now home to the New Gate Korean Presbyterian Church.	
St. Simon-the-Apostle Anglican Church	St. James Town	1883-2016	Merged to form St. Peter and St. Simon the Apostle.	
St. Timothy by-the-Humber Anglican Church	Humberlea	1924-2010	Closed. Building now home to the Apostolic Christian Church.	
St. Wilfrid Anglican Church, Islington	Islington	1955-2010	Closed. Building now occupied by a congregation of the Church of South India.	

== See also ==
- List of Anglican churches
- List of Anglican cathedrals in Canada
- List of Orthodox churches in Toronto
- List of Presbyterian churches in Toronto
- List of Catholic churches in Toronto
- List of Synagogues in Toronto
- List of United Church of Canada churches in Toronto
