= St. Paul's, Bloor Street =

Anglican church in Toronto, Ontario

St. Paul's Bloor Street
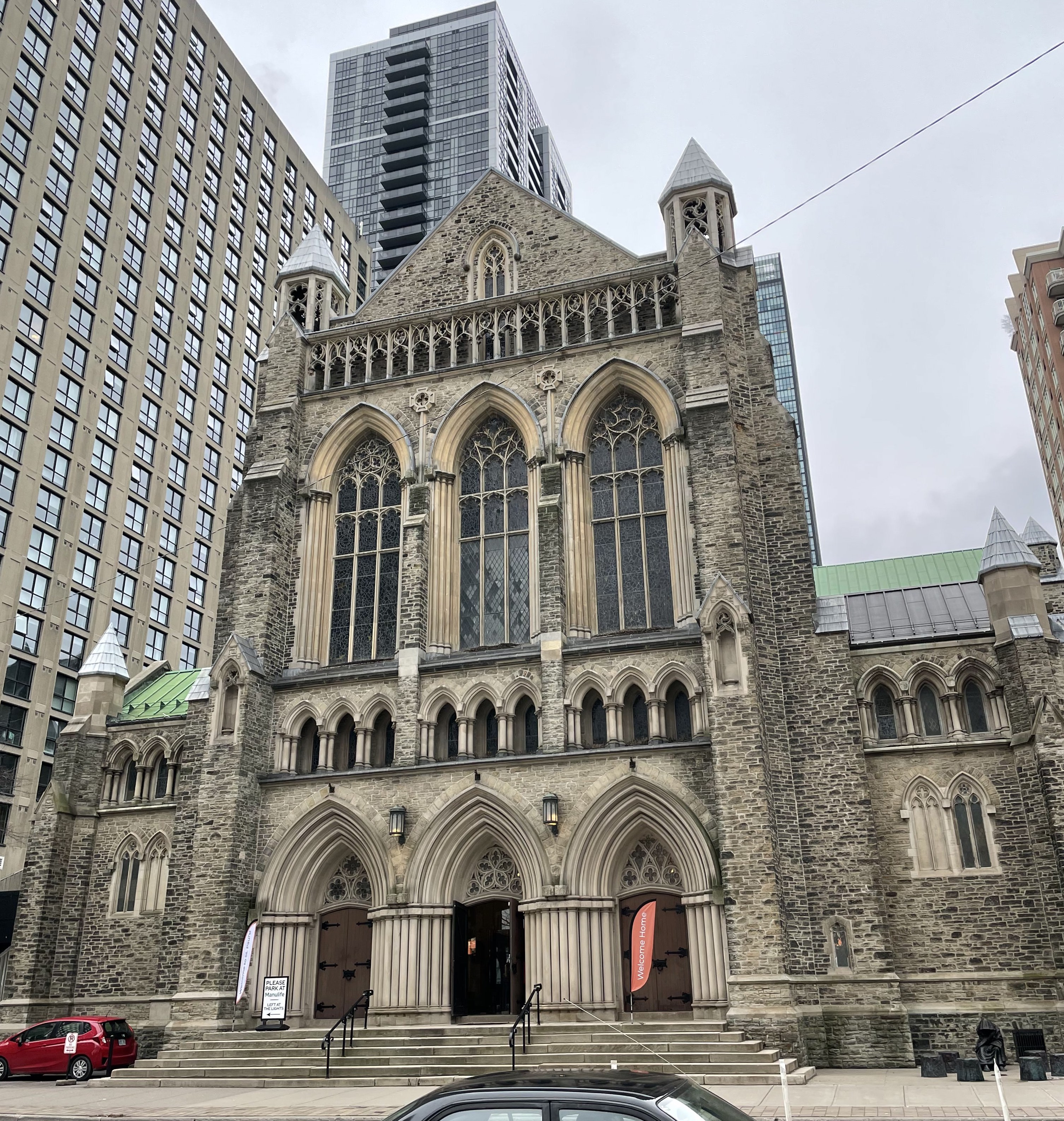
- Bloor Street façade of the church building in 2023
- St. Paul's Bloor Street
- 43.671083°N 79.381523°W
- Location: 227 Bloor Street East; Toronto, Ontario, Canada
- Denomination: Anglican Church of Canada
- Churchmanship: Low church
- Website: stpaulsbloor.org

History
- Founded: 1842; 184 years ago
- Founder: Alexander Sanson
- Dedication: Paul the Apostle

Architecture
- Architects: George Kent Radford and Edward Radford (old church); E. J. Lennox (new church)
- Style: Gothic Revival
- Years built: 1858–1860 (old church); 1909–1913 (new church)

Specifications
- Capacity: 1800

Administration
- Province: Ontario
- Diocese: Toronto
- Archdeaconry: South
- Deanery: St. James
- Parish: St. Paul, Bloor Street

Clergy
- Rector: Jenny Andison

Ontario Heritage Act
- Type: Municipally designated
- Designated: January 12, 1989
- By-law No.: 68-89

St. Paul's, Bloor Street, is an Anglican church located at 227 Bloor Street East in Toronto, Ontario. The present church building, completed in 1913, was designed by E. J. Lennox in the Gothic Revival style. At 10,000 square metres (110,000 sq ft), it is the largest church in the Diocese of Toronto. The building is designated under Part IV of the Ontario Heritage Act as being of cultural heritage value or interest. It is the regimental church of The Queen's Own Rifles of Canada.

== History ==
=== Founding ===
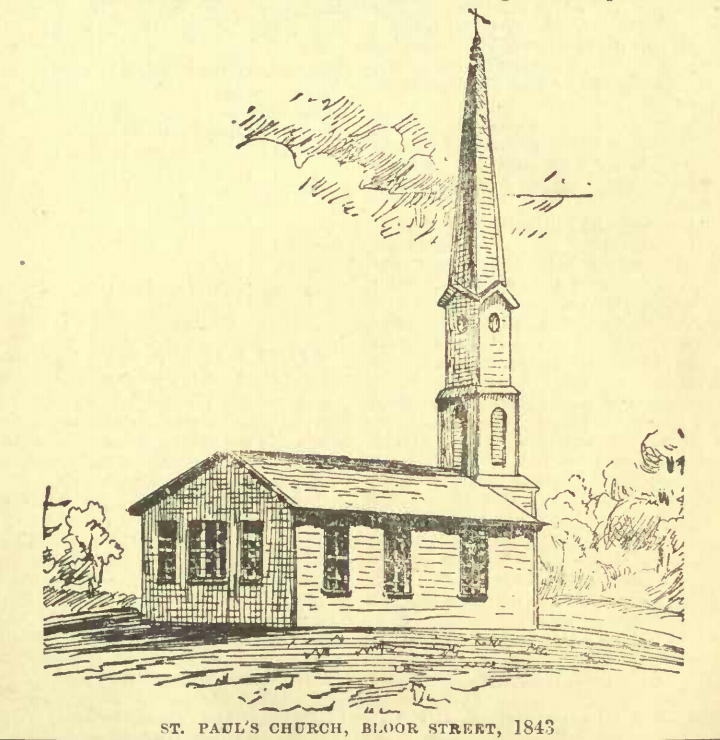
Sketch of the first church as it appeared in 1843 from Landmarks of Toronto (1904)

In 1841, the Rev. Alexander Sanson, rector of St. John's, York Mills, decided to establish an Anglican parish at the corner of Tollgate Road (now known as Bloor Street) and Yonge Street. He commissioned the architect John George Howard to begin construction. This small wooden church, known as the 'little church up Yonge Street', opened on June 12, 1842. The first rector was the Rev. Charles Matthews, and the congregation originally had 100 parishioners. Tollgate Road became St. Paul's Road shortly after the church's construction, then the name was changed to Sydenham Road in 1844 and eventually to Bloor Street in 1854.

=== Growth ===
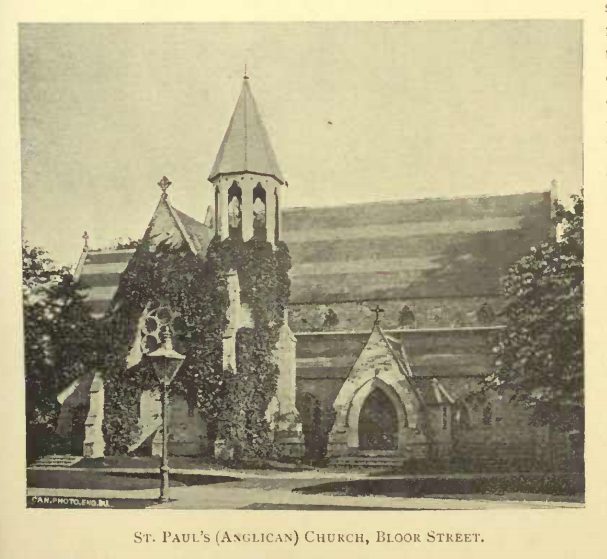
The old church, c. 1891

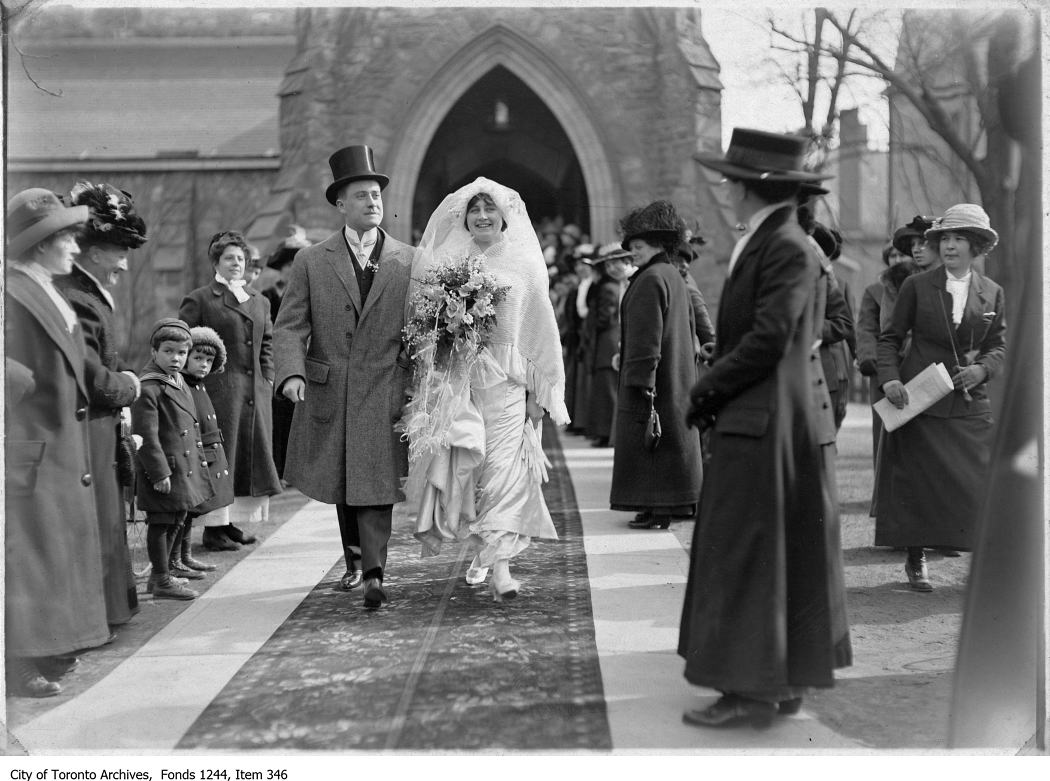
A bridal couple leaves the church, c. 1913

The congregation soon outgrew the original wooden building and by 1858, construction began on a stone structure (now referred to as the 'old church'), which was designed by brothers George Kent Radford and Edward Radford. This building was completed in 1860, with services first being held on December 9 of that year. The tower was completed in 1894. In 1861, the first building, minus its steeple, was moved to Potter's Field to serve as a mission church, whose parish eventually became the Church of the Redeemer.

=== New church ===
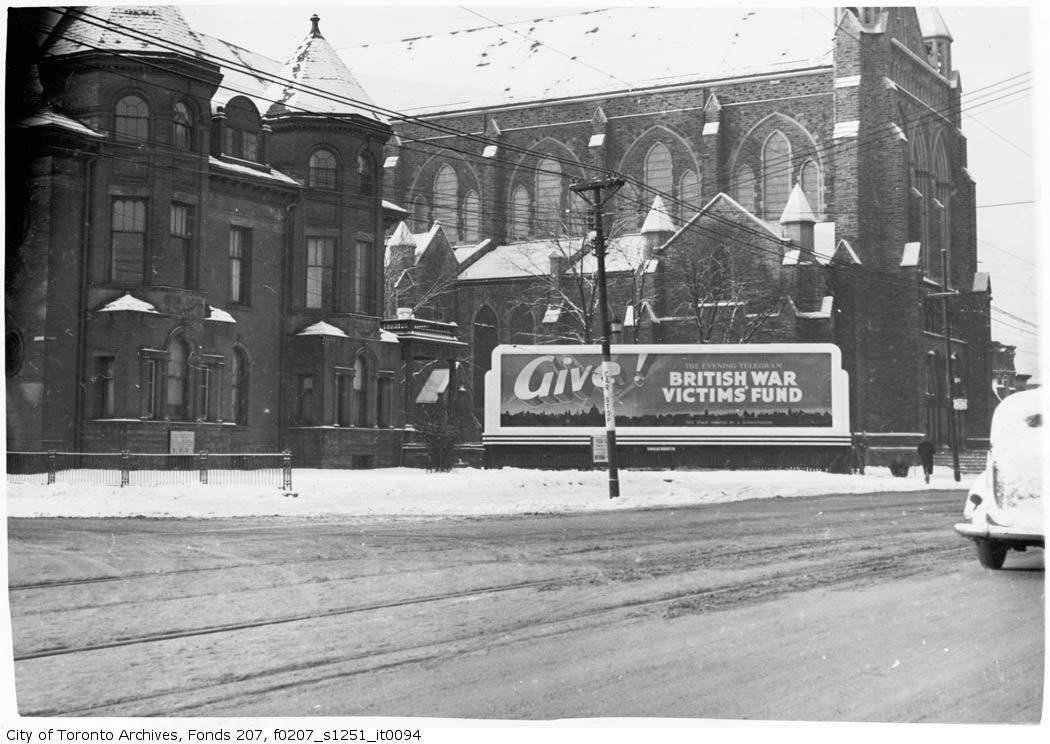
The new church, 1940

In 1907, the Rev. Canon Henry John Cody was appointed as rector. Canon Cody's reputation as a skilled orator drew more members to the church, and they soon needed a new building. The current sanctuary, known as the 'new church', broke ground in 1909. The cornerstone was laid in 1910 and the church was opened on November 30, 1913. Notable Toronto architect E. J. Lennox, who was a parishioner and had previously done additions to the old church in 1904, designed the new church in the Gothic Revival style. The new church originally had a seating capacity of 2500.

The church has a number of memorial plaques dedicated to parishioners who died in World War I, including Arthur Gerald Knight. Other memorials to fallen parishioners in the church include an ornate alabaster screen behind the altar, and large stained glass windows unveiled by Governor-General Lord Byng of Vimy.

Cody Hall, built in memory of Canon Cody's son Maurice (who died in a canoe accident), opened in 1928. It was also designed by Lennox. It contains a large theatre-style room, classrooms, a gym and a rifle range.

St. Paul's was one of two local churches dedicated to St. Paul the Apostle that provided the name for St. Paul's electoral district from its creation in 1933 until its boundaries were redrawn in 1966. The other St. Paul's, St. Paul's-Avenue Road United Church and later Trinity-St. Paul's United Church, ceased to be within the boundaries of the riding in 1987.

=== Recent history ===
In 1989, the church was designated under Part IV of the Ontario Heritage Act by the City of Toronto By-Law 68-89 as being of cultural heritage value or interest.

The Rt Rev. Victoria Matthews, the first woman to be made a bishop in the Anglican Church of Canada and fifth in the worldwide Anglican Communion, was consecrated in the church on February 12, 1994.

The church underwent a renovation in 1991. The seating capacity was reduced from 2500 to 1800 as the baptismal font was moved to the front of the nave. In 2006, a large renovation project, known as the Nehemiah Project, was completed by Black & Moffat Architects. This amalgamated all three buildings into one accessible complex of 10,000 square metres (110,000 sq ft).

=== Notable people ===
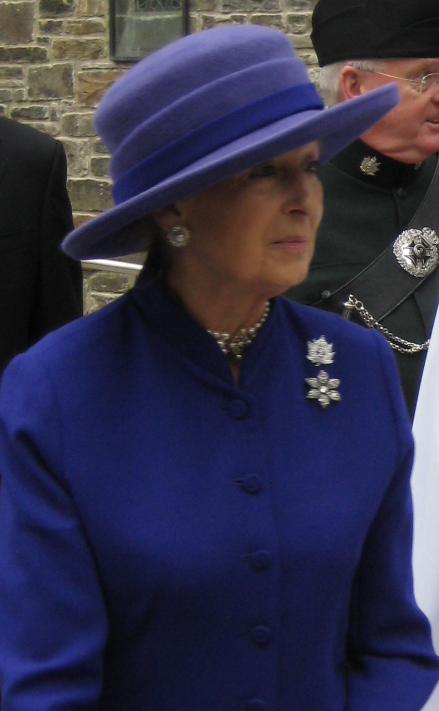
Princess Alexandra, colonel-in-chief of The Queen's Own Rifles of Canada from 1960 to 2010, at the church in 2010

Composer Healey Willan became organist-choirmaster of the church after immigrating to Canada in 1913. He left St. Paul's for the Church of St. Mary Magdalene in 1921. Other notable past organists include T. J. Crawford (1922-1931), Charles Peaker, John Tuttle (1975-1989), and Eric Robertson.

St. Paul's has been the venue of many notable funeral/memorial services, including: Lady Iris Mountbatten, a great-granddaughter of Queen Victoria, in 1982; former premiers of Ontario, George A. Drew in 1973 and John Robarts in 1982; pianist Glenn Gould in 1982; Hockey Hall of Famer Charlie Conacher in 1967; Allan Lamport, former mayor of Toronto, in 1999; and Hilary Weston, 26th lieutenant governor of Ontario, in 2025.

The church has also been the venue of many notable weddings, including that of Ralph McCreath and Myrtle Franceschini in 1946; Claude Bennett and Deborah Ferrier in 1977; Knowlton Nash and Lorraine Thomson in 1982; and Robert Seguso and Carling Bassett in 1987.

Besides Canon Cody, other notable past rectors of the church include the Rt Rev. Bishop Robert John Renison and the Rev. William Hockin. The Rt. Rev. Gregory Kerr-Wilson, present Metropolitan of the Northern Lights and Archbishop of Calgary, was assistant curate of the church from 1989 to 1991.

Pope John Paul II led a national ecumenical service at the church during his September 1984 visit to Canada. The service was attended by 2,200 members and leaders of over 30 denominations. Other notable visitors include Duke Ellington, Archbishop Desmond Tutu, multiple Archbishops of Canterbury and Princess Alexandra.

== Architecture ==
The church was designed by prominent local architect E. J. Lennox, who himself attended the church, in the Gothic Revival style. Lennox was inspired by the Victorian English gothic works of Augustus Pugin. The original plans called for an imposing tower over the northeast entrance, but this was scrapped due to financial reasons.

The nave measures 14 metres (46 ft) wide, 46 metres (151 ft) long and 28 metres (92 ft) high. The wide east and west transepts allow two-thirds of the congregation to be seated within 21 metres (69 ft) of the pulpit. The height of the transepts and the chancel are equal to the nave.

St. Paul's has a 106-stop Casavant Frères pipe organ. It was constructed in consultation with George Dixon. The organ was donated by the widow and family of Thomas Gibbs Blackstock KC. It was dedicated in April 1914 and first played by Healey Willan. At the time of its installation, it was the fourth-largest pipe organ in the world. The organ was cleaned and partially revoiced under the direction of John Tuttle and Alan T. Jackson in 1981.

There are three chapels in the church complex, St. Paul's, St. George's and the Good Shepherd.

== Services ==
On Sundays, St. Paul's offers three services: one according to the Book of Common Prayer at 8:15 am in St. Paul's Chapel; one contemporary following the Book of Alternative Services at 9:30 am; and a "classical" Anglican service at 11:00 am providing a contemporary language revision of the BCP rite. Throughout the week, the church offers communion on Tuesdays at 12:10 pm and an online compline service on Wednesdays at 7 pm.

The church's vision is "a church made alive by the power of the Holy Spirit, a city made new by the gospel of Jesus Christ, and a people made whole by the grace of God." It has extensive children and youth programs, as well as offering many adult programs, along with Outreach ministries.

Today, it is the largest church in the Diocese of Toronto. Because of its size, it often functions as a pro-cathedral for large diocesan events.

The incumbent rector is the Rt Rev. Bishop Jenny Andison. Prior to becoming rector, Bishop Andison was Suffragan Bishop of York-Credit Valley.

== The Queen's Own Rifles of Canada ==
Since 1910, St. Paul's, Bloor Street, has been the regimental church of The Queen's Own Rifles of Canada (QOR). A pew is designated for the colonel-in-chief of the regiment, presently The Queen, who was appointed when Duchess of Cornwall in 2010. Princess Alexandra, who served as colonel-in-chief from 1960 to 2010, visited the church on April 25, 2010, to mark the 150th anniversary of the regiment. The Cross of Sacrifice, a memorial to the fallen soldiers of the unit, stands outside the church.

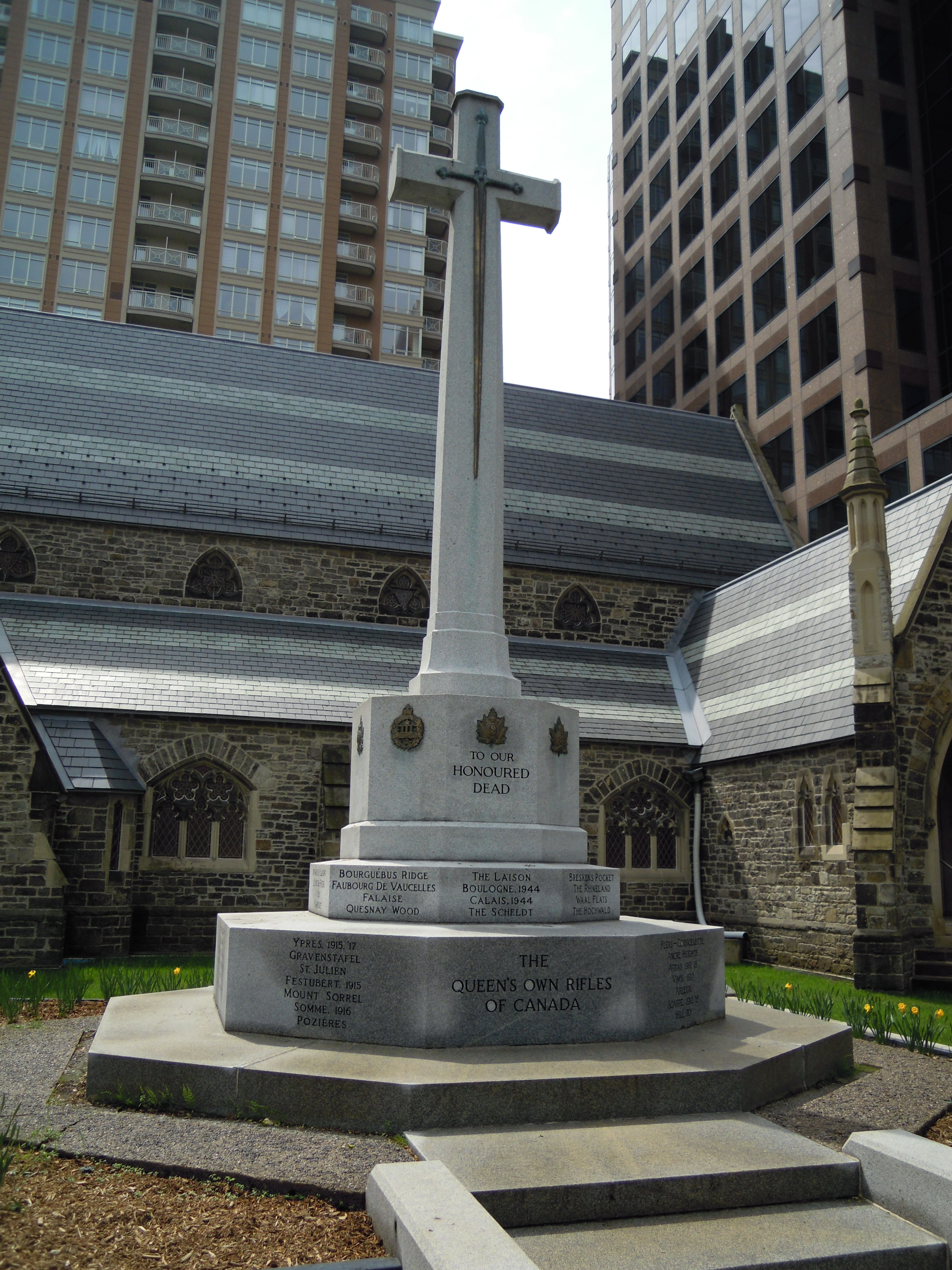
The Cross of Sacrifice outside the church

== See also ==
- List of Anglican churches in Toronto
- List of oldest buildings and structures in Toronto
