= Clara E. Speight-Humberston =

Canadian research scientist (1862–1936)

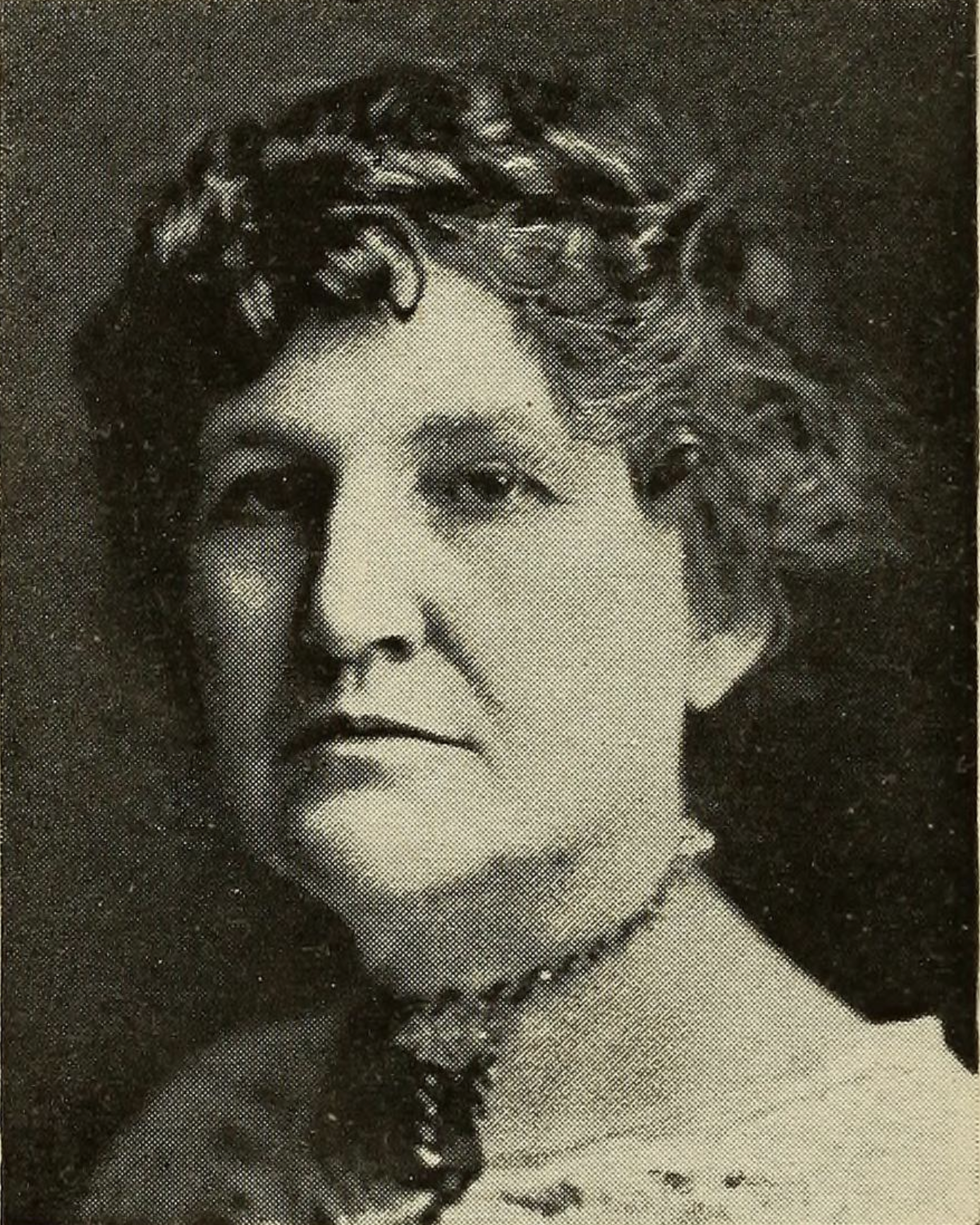
- Speight-Humberston in 1922
- Born: Clara Elma Speight; May 8, 1862; Acton West, Halton County, Ontario, Canada
- Died: April 25, 1936 (aged 73); Toronto, Ontario, Canada
- Resting place: St. John's Cemetery, York Mills
- Occupations: teacher; science researcher; writer
- Spouse: Simon Thomas Humberstone (m. 1881; died 1915)
- Children: 2
- Writing career
- Genres: biology; chemistry; mathematics; spiritism

Clara E. Speight-Humberston (née, Speight; after marriage, Clara E. Speight-Humberstone, Clara E. Speight-Humberston' , or Clara E. Speight-Humberston; (Note: Clara used alternate spellings of her married surname for each of her three books: Speight-Humberstone, The spherical bacteria cell, 1906; Speight-Humberstone', The origin of the chemical elements and of cell life, 1914; Speight-Humberston, Spiritism, 1914.) 1862–1936) was a Canadian research scientist whose research focused on mathematics, chemistry, spiritism, and biology. Author of numerous scientific books and articles, Humberston's writings on natural history subjects evidenced an acute perception of nature's forces in directing different forms of life.

== Early life and education ==
Clara Elma Speight was born on May 8, 1862, in Acton West, Halton County, Ontario. Her parents were Samuel Drake and Elizabeth (Van Vlack) Speight. Her father came to Canada from Wales where his family had lived for several hundreds of years.

She was educated in public schools, and the County Model School, where she became certified as a public school teacher.

== Career ==
In her early career, Humberston taught school. In 1900, she received patent number 11258 for a game of cards, "BOBS: THE NATIONAL GAME.".

Her early education and training did not include knowledge or desire to engage in research work. Her father was a great lover of nature and prepared a rare collection of birds, which he gave to his daughter for a wedding present (1881). She began to take a special interest in science study after marriage.

Later, in 1905, she was the author of the chart, "Birds of Canada in Relation to Agriculture", in its relation to agriculture, also of the wild flowers, and fishes and wild animals. It was prepared under supervision of the Ontario Department of Education for use in the schools of Canada as an aid to nature study. This meant two years study of life, a study which so impressed her with the numbers of the forms that classify human life that she developed an intense desire to know more, and an intensive study of chemistry resulted. From a study of Egyptian history, Humberston became convinced that the science of the ancients was correct, and that the modern laboratory is proving that fact.

Widowed in 1915, Humberston became internationally known as a scientific figure, producing a large number of scientific works.

The spherical bacteria cell : the constructor of the earth and her life through the radioactive construction of electro-magnetic particles (1906), brought her into prominence before the scientific world. The book demonstrated the fact that the hydrogen atom as a unit weight in the world of chemistry was duplicated in the world of life as the Spherical Bacteria Cell. Four months later, J. J. Thomson, Professor at London University, proved experimentally the unit weight of the hydrogen atom in nature's constructions, something unimagined in the world of chemistry before this.

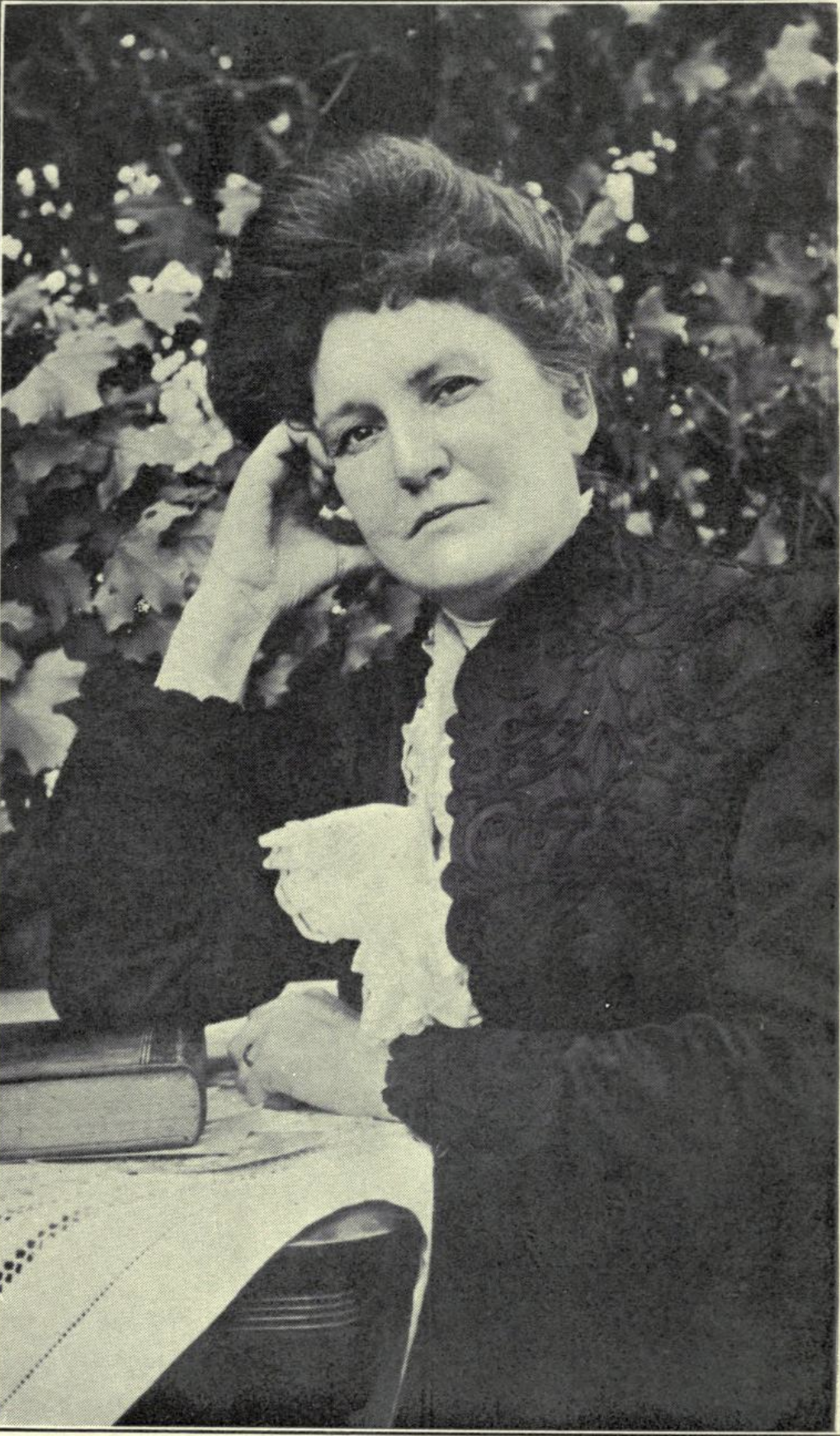
(1914)

She published The origin of the chemical elements and of cell life in 1914. Humberston contributed articles on natural history for Scientific American, Montreal Herald, and Farmer's Advocate. Her "Why the Chameleon changes color of skin" was pronounced as the best scientific explanation ever given. A 1927 scientific writing claimed to prove "Bacteria the constructor of the Earth and its cell life, expressing a primal epacial system of energy, maintaining an equilibrium in a process of disintegration and reconstruction of the Eternal Unit of Life, under Time bondage".

Humberston gained considerable prominence as lecturer on "The Origin of Form" as an evolutionary process of life, her description of "An Ice Storm" as a word picture, being equal to anything ever given from a public platform (The Mail and Empire, Toronto). In 1916, her lecture, "Why Germany Cannot Win War", was presented at the Borden Club, Edmonton, and the topic, "Armageddon", as presented at the Blue Moon Tea Room, under auspices of the Edmonton lodge of the Theosophical Society. At her lecture on "Auto Suggestion" (Star Theatre, Kitchener, Ontario, 1923), Humberston stated that Prof. Émile Coué had practised this method of healing by autosuggestion for the past eight years and has only sprung into prominence recently because of the interest taken by wealthier people, although he had practised for a number of years among the poorer classes of Paris. She stated that as scientists and scholars came to understand more and more of Coue's auto-suggestion, they would be able to abolish disease. She further stated that this theory of auto suggestion as practised by Coue was not a religious cult, and that our bodily systems were controlled by the unconscious or subconscious part of our mind. She also dwelt briefly on Einstein's theory of relativity, stating that Einstein was able to confound the scientific world through his knowledge of the Kabbalah and Zohar, and that the secret knowledge of the origin of life as outlined in it was through the secret code known only to Hebrews.

Humberston transmitted a very large number of communications to the Société astronomique de France on diverse subjects, such as: magnetic system of space and time; the action of sunlight on plants; spatial origin of form; and Flammarion's mathematical calculation. These communications, like all those addressed to the society, were retained in the society's Archives. In 1925, she became a member of the society upon the recommendation of the society's founder, Camille Flammarion.

Humberston was also a member of various other clubs and societies including: Progressive Research (Toronto, 1908–17); Bordon (Edmonton); Imperial Order Daughters of the Empire (Vice-President of Major Fane Chapter); The Woman's Canadian Club (Edmonton), Toronto Theosophical, and Canadian Red Cross.

== Personal life ==
On September 6, 1881, she married Simon Thomas Humberstone (Note: Clara's husband and other members of his family spelled the surname "Humberstone".) (1846–1915), Newtonbrook, York County, of the family of Humberstone, County Denbigh, England. Simon was a political figure (reeve of York) and a potter. Five generations of the Humberstone family created pottery in Ontario.

The couple had one son and one daughter.

In religion, she was Anglican.

She made her home in Toronto.

After a lengthy illness, Clara Speight-Humberston died in Toronto on April 25, 1936, with internment at St. John's Cemetery, York Mills.

== Selected works ==
Spiritism

=== As Clara E. Speight-Humberstone ===
- The spherical bacteria cell : the constructor of the earth and her life through the radioactive construction of electro-magnetic particles, 1906 (text via Internet Archive)

=== As Clara E. Speight-Humberston' ===
- The origin of the chemical elements and of cell life, 1914 (text via Internet Archive)

=== As Clara E. Speight-Humberston ===
- Spiritism, the hidden secret in Einstein's theory of relativity, 1922 (text via Internet Archive)
- The Spacial Origin of Man
- The Mathematics of Immortality (published posthumously, London, England)
