= Church of St. Mary Magdalene (Toronto) =

Church in Toronto, Canada

Coordinates: 43.659033°N 79.413721°W

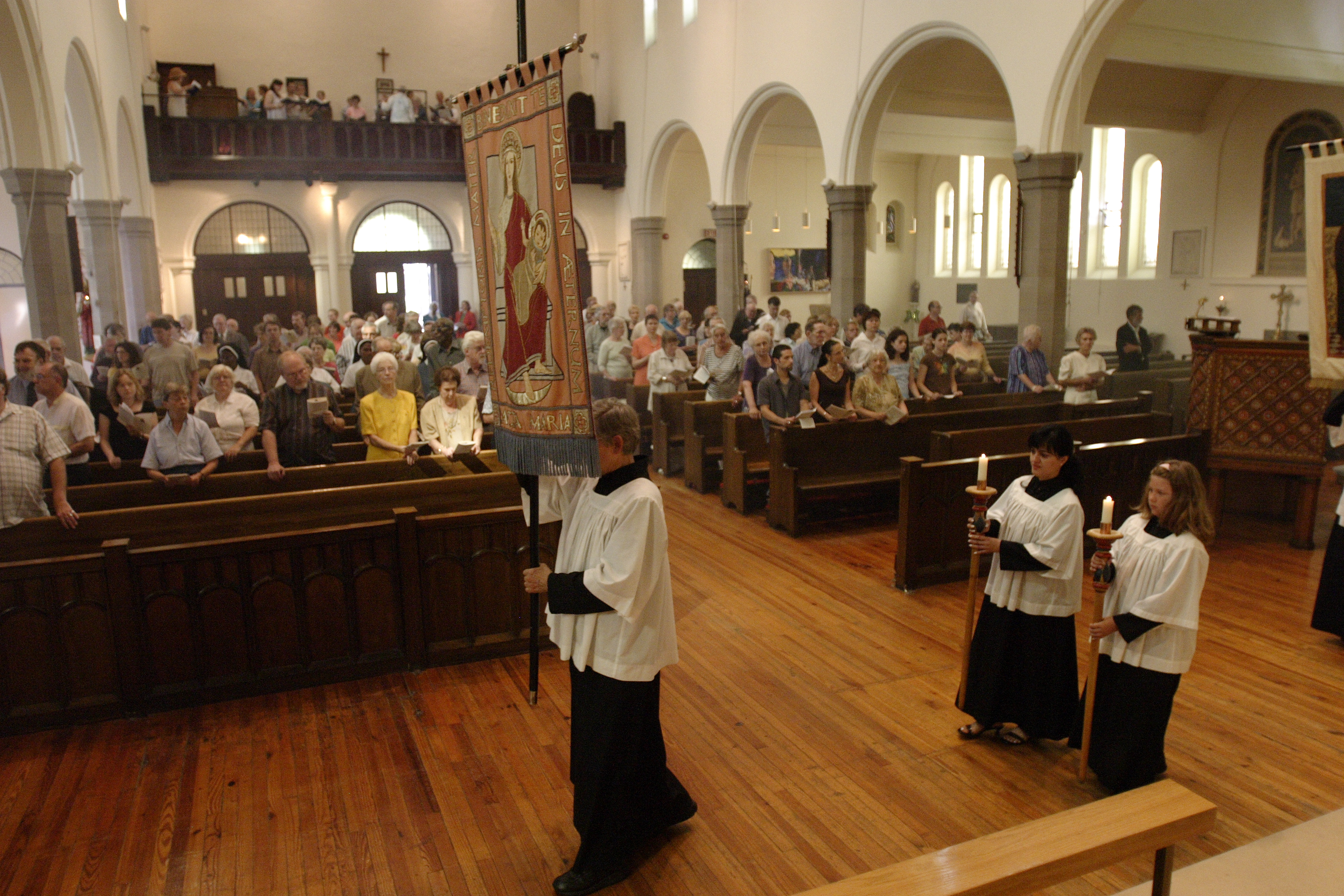
- Patronal festival in 2006
- Church of St. Mary Magdalene
- Location: 477 Manning Avenue; Toronto, Ontario, Canada
- Denomination: Anglican Church of Canada
- Churchmanship: Anglo-Catholic
- Website: stmarymagdalene.ca

History
- Dedication: Mary Magdalene

Architecture
- Architect: Darling and Pearson
- Style: Gothic Revival
- Groundbreaking: 1888
- Completed: 1908

Administration
- Province: Ontario
- Diocese: Toronto
- Deanery: Parkdale
- Parish: St. Mary Magdalene

The Church of St. Mary Magdalene (also known as SMM) is a parish of the Anglican Church of Canada located in Toronto, Ontario. It is named for Jesus' companion, Mary Magdalene, and is famous for its association with composer Healey Willan, who was the organist and choirmaster for over four decades. The church was founded in 1888 and is situated at 477 Manning Avenue in Toronto.

== Theology ==
SMM is an Anglo-Catholic parish. Originally the church used a liturgical style reflecting the convergence of Roman Catholic and Anglican influences. In 1919, the church shifted more towards Roman-style parish life. At that time the Rev H. Griffin Hiscocks began hearing private confessions.

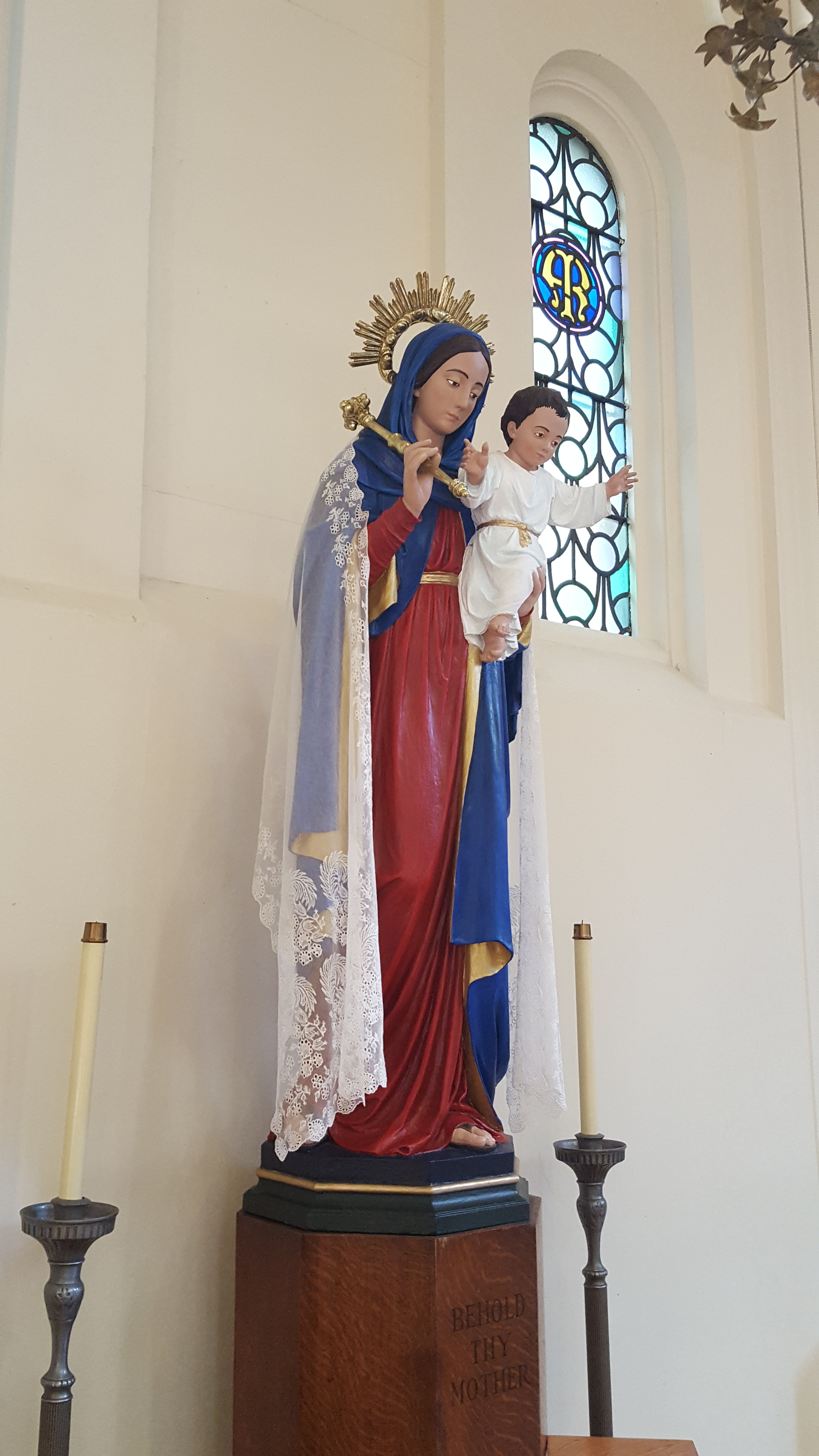
Statue of the Blessed Virgin Mary at the Church of St. Mary Magdalene

During this period, the church began to use incense and installed a large statue of the Blessed Virgin Mary (now in the south aisle of the church). Newspaper accounts of the time relate that the installation was controversial. A chip in the statue's toe shows evidence of a hammer attack made by those hostile to Catholicism.

In 1966, the church became one of the first Anglican churches in Canada whose priests gave the Solemn Mass facing the congregation, as became common among Catholics following the Second Vatican Council.

"In 1967 the Rev'd Mountain "Monty" Hutt became rector ... [and] organized the first outdoor procession of the Blessed Sacrament in 1974."

Rev Hutt was the brother of William Hutt, an actor in the Stratford Festival who also toured nationally and internationally.

== Founding and development ==
The church was founded in 1888 by a group from the nearby Church of St. Matthias led by the Reverend Charles Darling, who had previously been an assistant at the Church of St Mary Magdalene, Paddington. The church building was designed by the rector's brother—Toronto architect Frank Darling.

The original building was completed in 1908, with a choir loft added in the 1920s. In 1993, renovations added spaces for instruction, meeting, and church administration. In 2008, another renovation to the liturgical space opened up windows that had been closed in the 1920s.

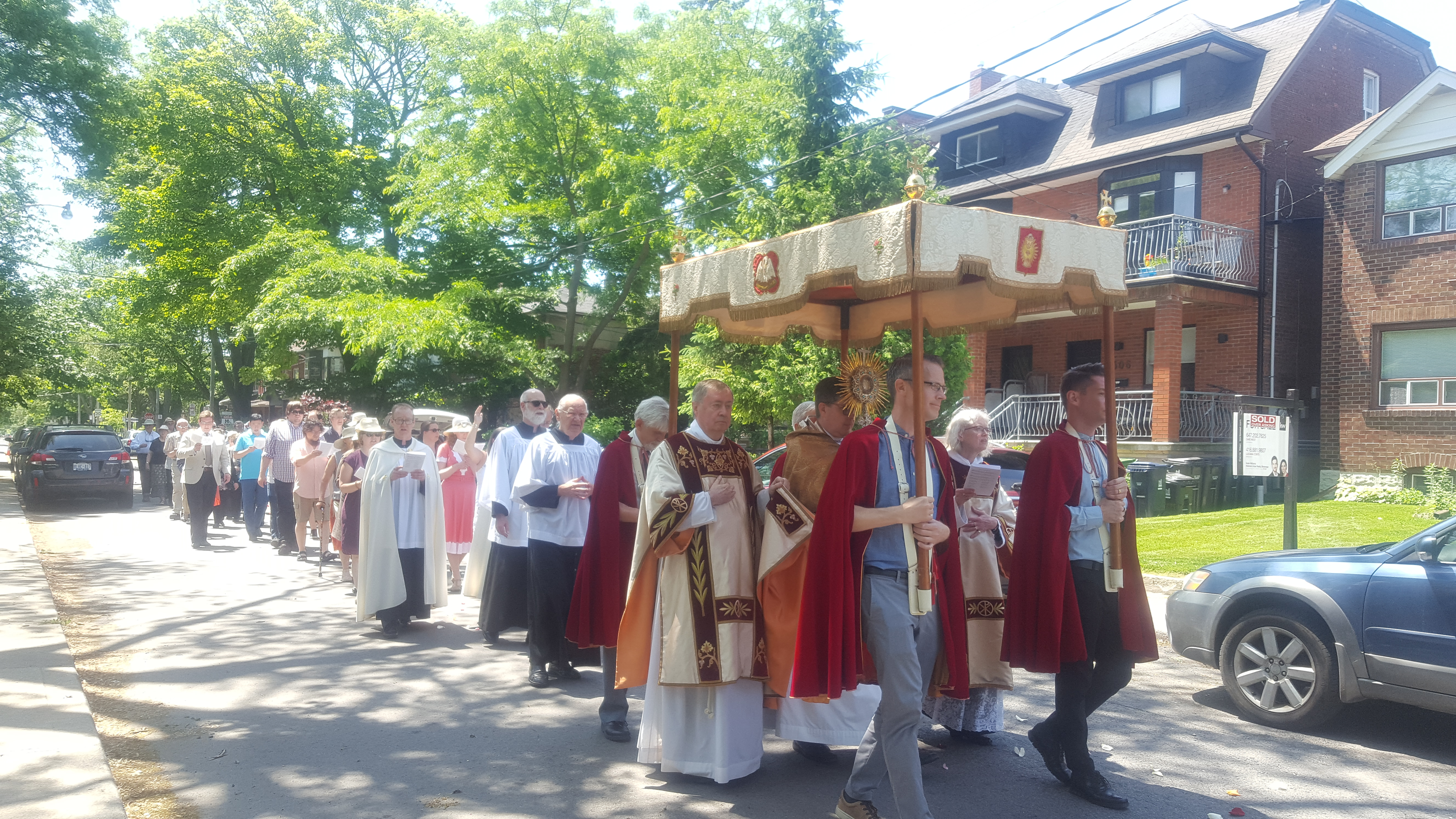
Church of St. Mary Magdalene outdoor procession of the Blessed Sacrament, Corpus Christi 2019

SMM has a collection of sacred art. A Rood Cross hangs from the chancel arch to commemorate the parish war dead of World War I. It was designed by architect William Rae, modelled by Frances Loring and originally painted by Frank Johnston (one of the Group of Seven). Sylvia Hahn painted a pastoral scene of a young Jesus in the north aisle, as well as the triptych behind the Lady Altar in the south aisle. A painting by Lynn Donoghue hanging near the baptismal font explores the challenges of faith in the modern age. Devotional stations include statues of Saint Benedict, Saint Joseph, and Saint Mary Magdalene.

== Music ==
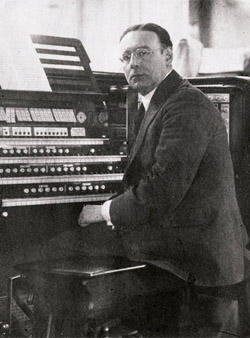
Healy Willan in 1918

SMM is known for excellence in sacred music. In 1940, Robertson Davies reported in the magazine Saturday Night that there were only two things worth doing in Toronto, seeing the Chinese Collection at the Royal Ontario Museum and listening to St. Mary Magdalene's choirs. This owed much to the work of Healey Willan who came to the parish in 1921 and remained as the organist and choirmaster until shortly before his death in 1968. Willan composed music for the church’s liturgies and performance elsewhere that have lasting use and influence. He was at one time best known internationally as the only composer outside England who was asked for and provided music for the coronation of Queen Elizabeth II in 1953. He was also an accomplished organist famous for his improvisational skill. He once remarked, "You have a sense of home, absolute completion... doing the work you want to do and the work you feel you can do."

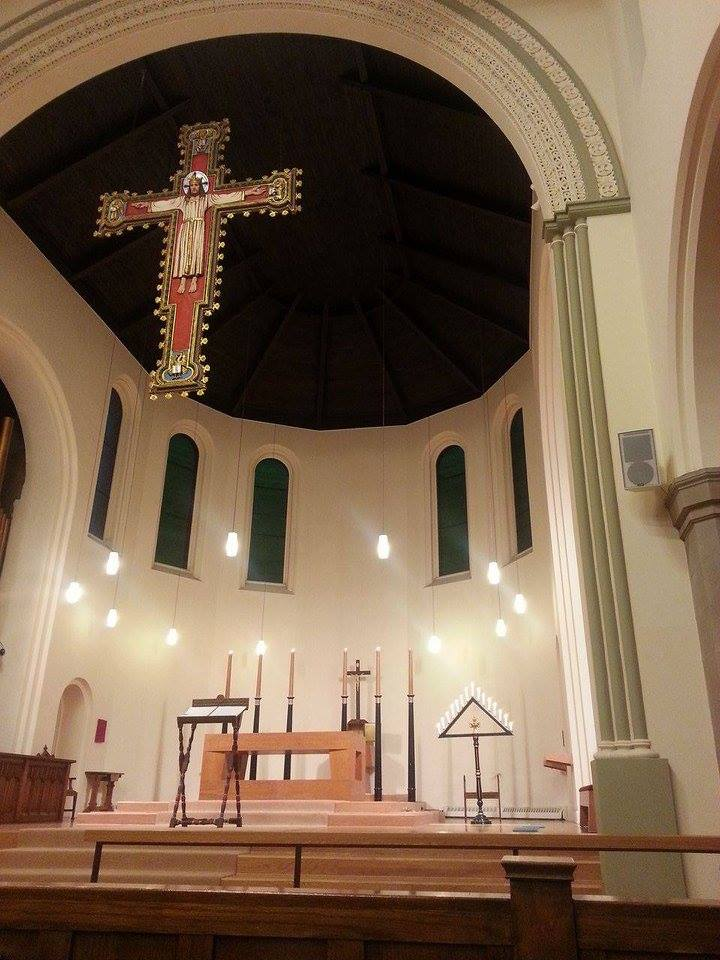
The church of St Mary Magdalene (Toronto) set up for Tenebrae during Holy Week

The musical services of Tenebrae celebrated in Holy Week are the best attended services of the year. The choirs specialise in polyphonic music, Gregorian Chant, and modern music by diverse composers, especially Canadian composers.

== Variety of worship ==
The parish celebrates contemporary language liturgies based on the Canadian Book of Alternative Services. SMM was involved in the development of the "reordered" 1962 Eucharistic Rite contained in the BAS. For some time the parish had experimented by cutting and pasting pages of the Canadian Book of Common Prayer into the Anglican Missal. The resulting "reordered rite" combined the sequence of Roman usage, Canadian BCP prayers, and supplemental liturgical material (e.g. minor propers) from more ancient sources.

== Cultural references ==
SMM was part of the composite that Robertson Davies used to form "St. Aidan's" in his 1994 novel The Cunning Man. Davies attended Mass there while he was a Presbyterian student at Upper Canada College. The church is also mentioned in Marian Engel's "The Glassy Sea."

== Notable people ==
On 3 July 1989, Queen Elizabeth The Queen Mother visited the church, participated in the Solemn Mass, and unveiled a national historic plaque to the memory of Healey Willan.

The Right Honourable Adrienne Clarkson, former Governor General of Canada, is a parishioner of the parish .

== See also ==
- List of Anglican churches in Toronto
