= George Dixon =

George Dixon may refer to:

== Arts and entertainment ==
- George Washington Dixon (1801?–1861), American singer and newspaper editor
- George Dixon (organ designer) (1870–1950), British organ designer
- George Dixon (trumpeter) (1909–1994), American trumpeter
- George Dixon (The Spinners) (fl. 1960s), member of The Spinners (American group)
- George Dixon (television character) (fl. 1950s–1970s), titular character of the television series Dixon of Dock Green

== Sports ==
- George Dixon (boxer) (1870–1908), Canadian boxer
- George Dixon (baseball) (1896–1940), American Negro leagues catcher
- George Dixon (rugby union) (1901–1991), American rugby player
- George Dixon (Canadian football) (1933–1990), Canadian Football League (CFL) Hall of Fame player
- George Dixon (rugby league) (fl. 1920s–1930s), English rugby league footballer
- George Riley Dixon (1848–1912), American collegiate football player and lawyer

== Others ==
- George Dixon (Cockfield Canal) (1731–1785), English engineer
- George Dixon (Royal Navy officer) (1748–1795), English sea captain and explorer
- George Dixon (MP) (1820–1898), MP for Birmingham 1867–1876 and Edgbaston 1885–1898
- George E. Dixon (1837–1864), American commander of the Confederate submarine H. L. Hunley
- George Hall Dixon (1920–2013), American banker

== See also ==
- George Dickson, American gridiron football player and coach
- Alexander George Dickson (1834–1889), Conservative MP
