= St. Clement's Church (Toronto) =

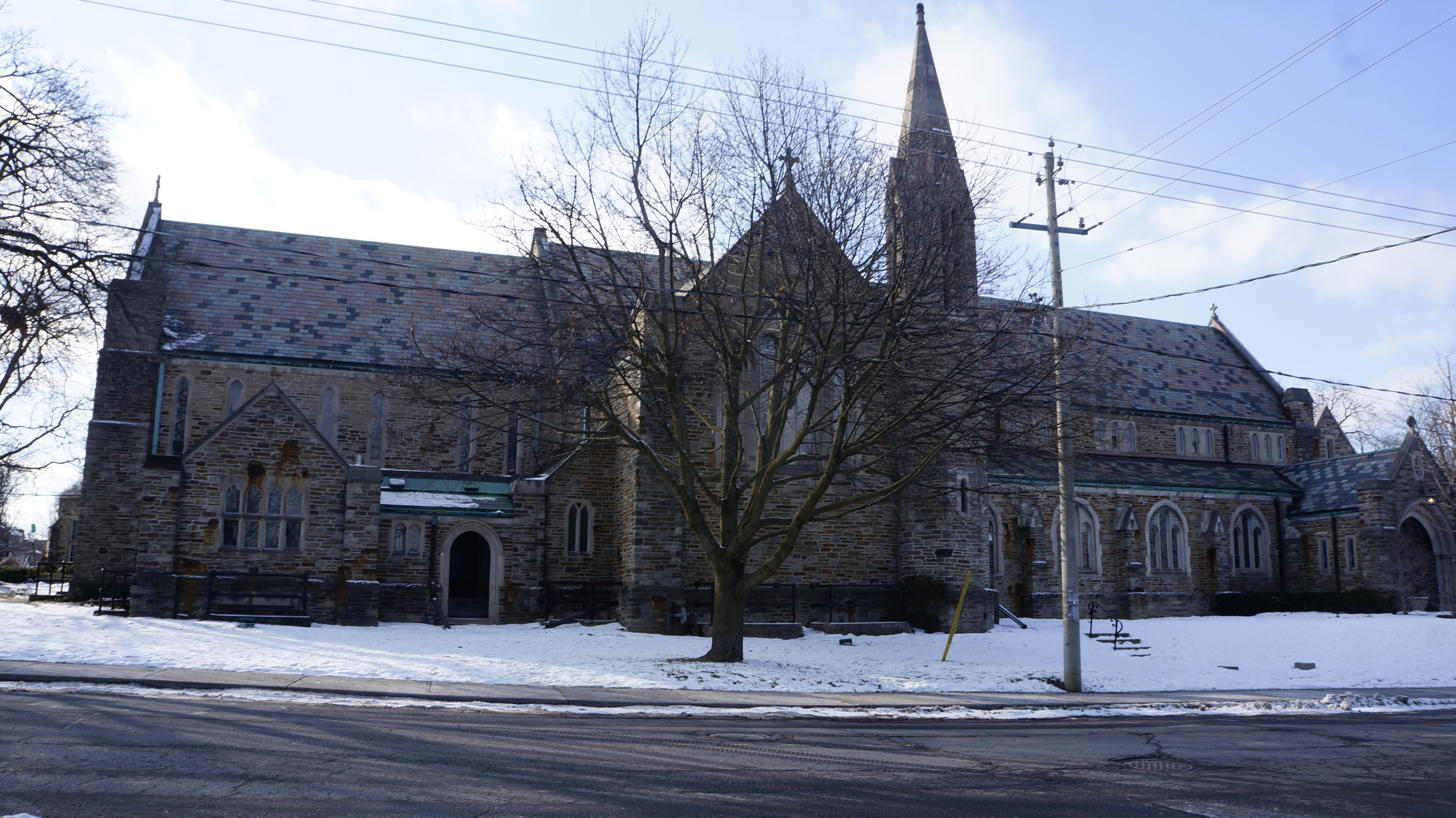
- St. Clement's Church in February 2021
- St. Clement's Church
- 43.712647°N 79.4041637°W
- Location: 70 St. Clement's Avenue; Toronto, Ontario
- Denomination: Anglican Church of Canada
- Website: www.stclementsto.ca

Architecture
- Architect(s): Page & Warrington; Charles MacKay Willmot
- Style: Gothic Revival
- Years built: 1925

Administration
- Province: Ontario
- Diocese: Toronto

Clergy
- Rector: The Rev. Canon Andrew Federle

St. Clement's Church, also known as St. Clement's, Eglinton, is an Anglican church located in the Yonge–Eglinton neighbourhood of Toronto, Ontario.

The parish was established in 1891 by St. John's, York Mills. The present church building was erected in 1925 by architects Page & Warrington and Charles MacKay Willmot. A parish hall, designed by Molesworth & Secord, was added in 1938.

In 1901, Canon Thomas Wesley Powell, Rector of St. Clement's, founded St. Clement's School. Classes were first offered in the parish hall but they later moved to their own purpose-built building down the street. Initially co-ed, the school today is all girls and remains affiliated with the church.

== See also ==
- List of Anglican churches in Toronto
- St. Clement's School
