= Healey Willan =

English and Canadian composer (1880–1968)

Healey Willan CC
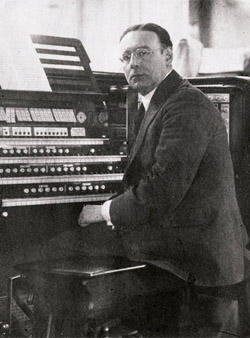
- Willan in 1918
- Born: James Healey Willan; 12 October 1880; London, England
- Died: 16 February 1968 (aged 87); Toronto, Ontario, Canada
- Occupations: Organist; composer

James Healey Willan CC (12 October 1880 – 16 February 1968) was an English and Canadian organist and composer, and an influential teacher. He composed more than 800 works including operas, symphonies, chamber music, a concerto, and pieces for band, orchestra, organ, and piano. He is best known for his church music.

== Biography ==
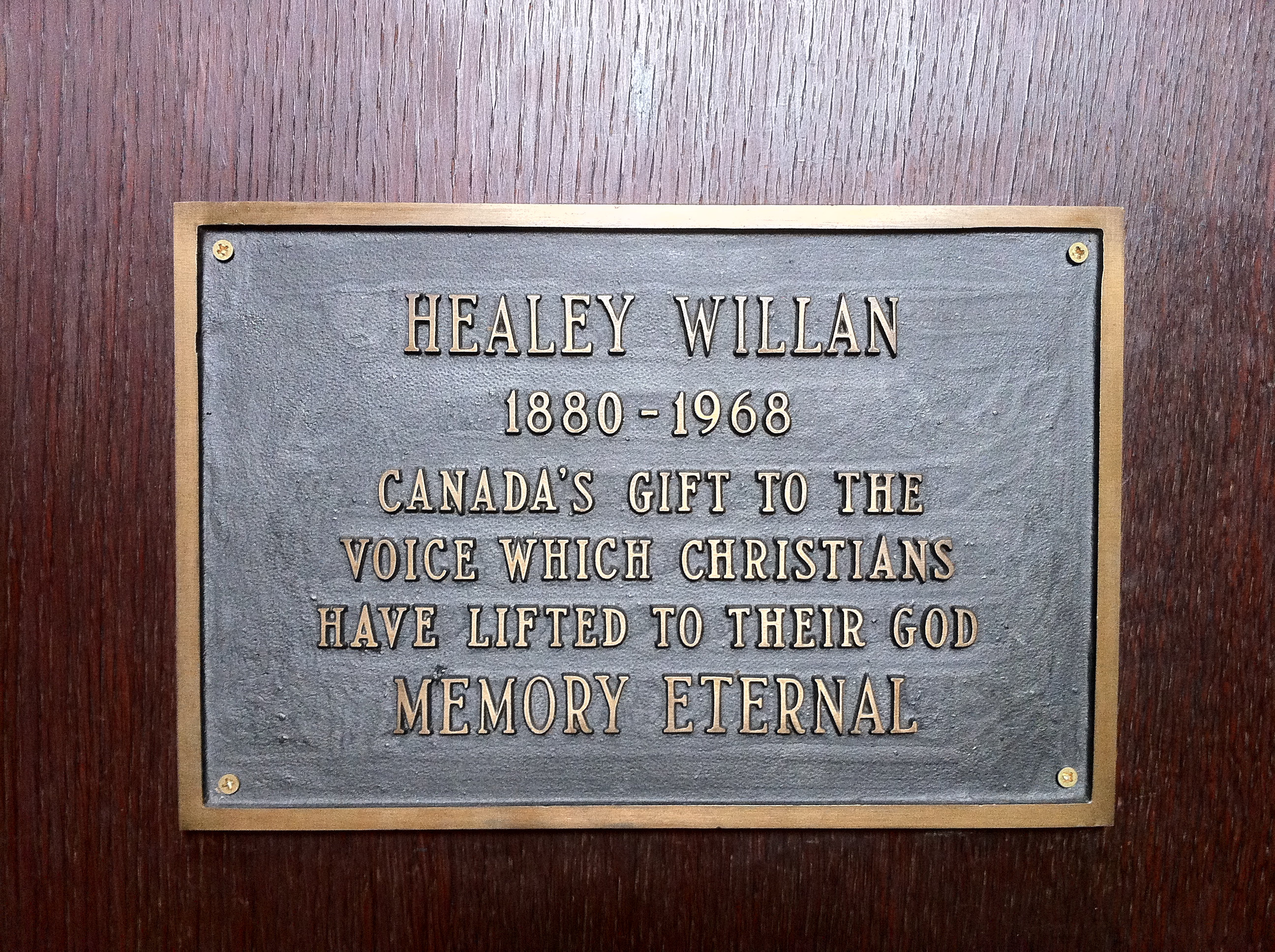
Memorial to Healey Willan

Willan was born in England on 12 October 1880 and began musical training at age eight, with studies at St. Saviour's Choir School in Eastbourne. He continued at St. Saviour's until 1895, when he began working as organist and choirmaster at several London-area churches. He earned, by examination in organ playing, harmony, counterpoint, history and orchestration, the ARCO in 1897 and fellowship in 1899. From 1903 to 1913, he was organist and choirmaster of St. John the Baptist Church on Holland Road in London. The Anglo-Catholic Tractarian movement had led to an Anglican revival of plainsong, and in 1910 Willan joined the London Gregorian Association (which strove to preserve and revive "plain-chant"). In 1913 Willan emigrated to Canada.

Willan became organist-choirmaster of Toronto's largest church, St. Paul's, Bloor Street, whose rector, Canon Cody, was later to become Ontario provincial education minister and the chancellor of the University of Toronto. In 1914, Willan was appointed a lecturer and examiner in music at the university. His royalties as a church music composer allowed him to leave "low church" St. Paul's in 1921 and to become precentor of the Church of St. Mary Magdalene (Toronto). He remained there until his death. St. Mary Magdalene's, under Willan, became a North American mecca for choral and Anglican church musicians. In 1934 he founded the Tudor Singers, which he conducted until it disbanded in 1939.

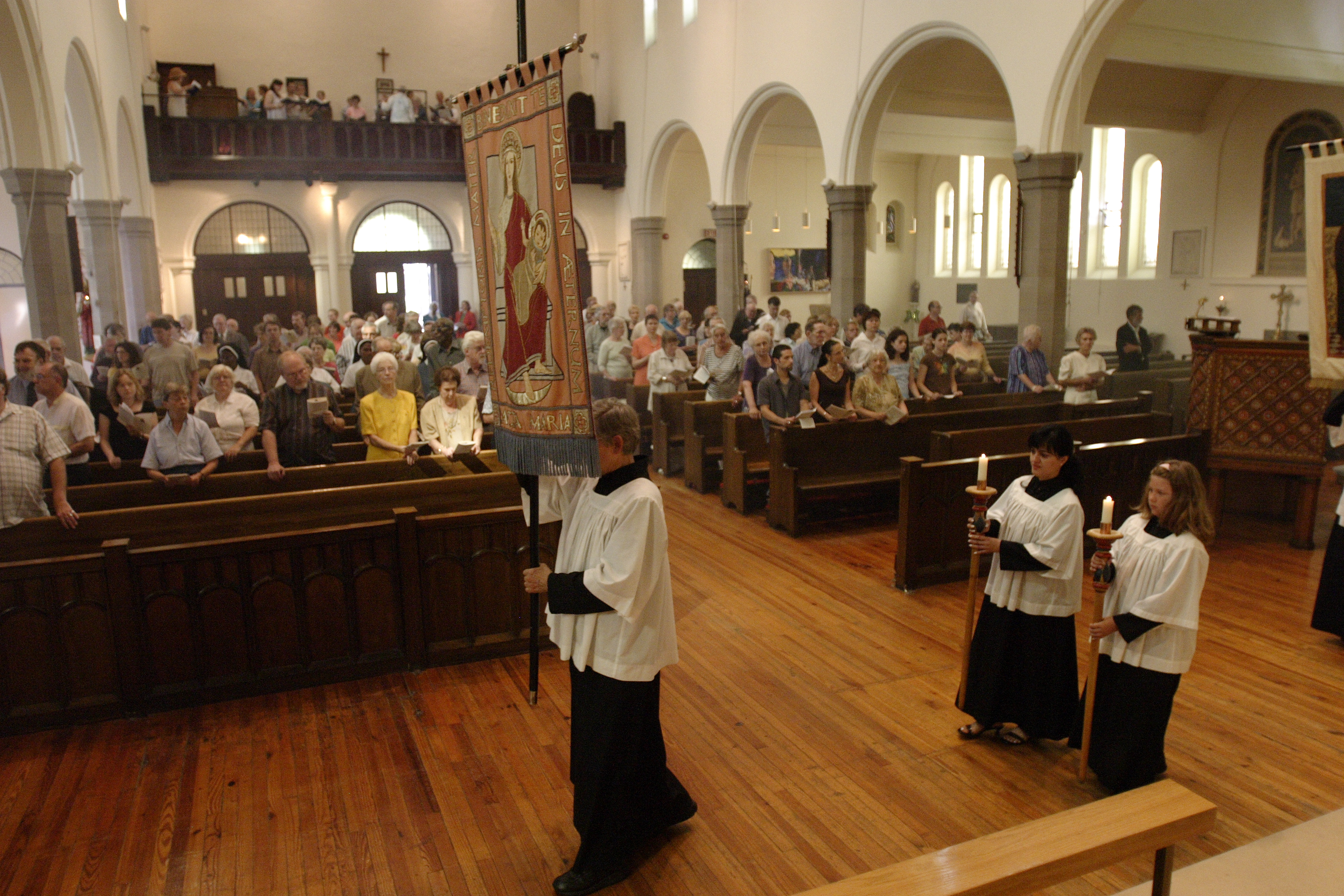
Church of St. Mary Magdalene

In 1920 the Toronto Conservatory (since 1947 the Royal Conservatory of Music) appointed Willan as head of its theory department. Later he became vice-principal. The conservatory was part of the University of Toronto. Students from the conservatory could become eligible to complete the music degree examinations administered by the university. From 1937 to 1950, Willan was University of Toronto Professor of Music and Organist and responsible for the music degree examinations. 2000 people attended an October 15, 1955 concert in St. Paul's to honor his 75th birthday.

His notable pupils included pianists Howard Brown and Naomi Yanova, tenor Gordon Wry, and composers Cecil Gray, Patricia Blomfield Holt, Walter MacNutt, F. R. C. Clarke, Phyllis Gummer, Eldon Rathburn, Robert Fleming, and Kenneth Peacock. See: List of music students by teacher: T to Z#Healey Willan.

When the Order of Canada was established in 1967, it named Willan a Companion. In Britain, it was customary for the Archbishop of Canterbury to occasionally grant very distinguished English cathedral musicians the Lambeth Doctorate, Mus. D Cantuar; in 1956 Willan, "the Dean of Canadian composers" became the first non-English church musician to be so honoured; subsequently, many Canadian universities followed suit. Willan was one of the first Canadian musicians to appear on a Canadian postage stamp. It was not lost on young Canadian musicians that Willan was able to make his livelihood as a composer, and that being a composer was something to which they might realistically aspire.

Willan, who would describe his provenance "English by birth; Canadian by adoption; Irish by extraction; Scotch by absorption", died on 16 February 1968 in Toronto. The park immediately to the east of St. Mary Magdalene church was named in his honour.

== Compositions ==
While serving as the organist and choirmaster at St. Paul's, Bloor Street, Willan became interested in the music of another Anglican parish, that of the Church of St. Mary Magdalene. St. Paul's was an evangelical, low church; St. Mary Magdalene's, while much smaller, was notably high church or Anglo-Catholic. By 1920, Willan was assisting with choir practice. In 1921, he resigned his post at St. Paul's and turned his attention to St. Mary Magdalene's. He set about creating a great many liturgical works for use in the church's services and on creating one of the few choirs in North America with expertise in singing unaccompanied music to a very high standard. He remained at St. Mary Magdalene's until shortly before his death, last directing the choir in 1967.

Willan's sacred choral and organ works show evidence of his love for plainsong and Renaissance music. Many of his liturgical compositions employ western church modes from a thousand years ago and the modality and harmony of late nineteenth-century Russian Orthodox choral music. His vocal lines are significantly more melismatic, his style more contrapuntal and rhythmically much freer than was the case in the liturgical music of his contemporaries. The lively acoustics at Saint Mary Magdalene allowed the melismatic lines to soar and yet linger at the same time. His larger choral works, however, were very Romantic in nature. His rich harmonic palette and luxuriant, soaring melodies stand as testament to his admiration of both Brahms and Wagner.

His music represents a unique and beautiful combination of styles: both an homage to the sacred music of five centuries ago and a reflection of the innovations of the Romantic/post-Romantic period in which he lived.

Of the 800 pieces Willan composed, the majority are sacred works. But his non-sacred opus includes some 50 choral works, 100 song arrangements for voice with piano accompaniment, many works for piano solo, for voice with instrumental accompaniment, two symphonies, a piano concerto, chamber works, incidental music for stage works, ballad operas, and at least one important opera (Deirdre, 1943-45). His Introduction, Passacaglia and Fugue (1916) was inspired by the Max Reger piece of the same name. A 1964 EMI recording by Francis Jackson helped bring the piece into the mainstream repertoire. His Second Symphony (1936-41) has been recorded by the Toronto Symphony Orchestra, and his Piano Concerto (1944) in late romantic style has been described (by Giles Bryant) as "unjustly neglected".

In 1953, Willan received a commission to write an anthem for the Coronation of Queen Elizabeth II. The resulting anthem, O Lord Our Governour, continues to be frequently performed. Willan's friends clubbed together to pay for his fare to London, so that he could attend the ceremony in person.

== Works ==
A fairly comprehensive listing of his works is given at the International Music Score Library Project. The Giles Bryant Healey Willan Catalogue assigns numbers to (some of) Willan's works, eg B314, Rise up, my love, my fair one.

- Introduction, Passacaglia and Fugue for Organ in E♭ minor (1916)
- Passcaglia and Fugue
- Epilogue
- Andante, Fugue and Chorale for Organ in C♯ minor (1965)

=== Choral works ===
- An Apostrophe to the Heavenly Hosts (1921), for double chorus a capella
- England My England (Pro Rege Nostro), cantata for mixed chorus and piano accompaniment or orchestra
- The Mystery of Bethlehem, Christmas cantata for soprano and baritone solo, mixed chorus, and organ or orchestra
- O Perfect Love, sacred song for high voice

==== Missae breves ====
- Missa brevis No. 1 in E♭
- Missa brevis No. 2 in F minor
- Missa brevis No. 3 in F major
- Missa brevis No. 4 in E major (1934), based on the plainsong hymn, Corde natus ex parentis
- Missa brevis No. 5 in F♯ minor (1935)
- Missa brevis No. 6 in F minor (1935)
- Missa brevis No. 7, "O Westron Wynde" (1936), based on the English folk melody of the same name
- Missa brevis No. 8 in D minor, "Missa SS Philippi et Jacobi" (1949)
- Missa brevis No. 9 in A minor, "Missa Sancti Michaelis" (1947)
- Missa brevis No. 10 in C minor/major (1948)
- Missa brevis No. 11 in G minor/major, "Missa Sancti Johannis Baptistae" (1953)
- Missa brevis No. 12 in D major (1956), based on the Christmas plainsong hymn, Christe Redemptor omnium
- Missa brevis No. 13 in G minor, "Holy Cross" (1960)
- Missa brevis No. 14, "St Alphege" (1962)

==== Motets ====
- How They So Softly Rest (1917)
- Hail, Gladdening Light (1924)
- O How Glorious (1924)
- Very Bread, Good Shepherd Tend Us (1924)
- O Sacred Feast (1924)
- O How Sweet (1924)
- Let Us Worship (1924)
- O Trinity, Most Blessed Light (1925)
- The Three Kings (1928)
- Preserve Us O Lord (1928)
- O King All Glorious (1928)
- I Beheld Her (1928)
- Fair in Face (1928)
- Rise Up, My Love (1929)
- O King of Glory (1929)
- Lo, in the Time Appointed (1929)
- O King to Whom All Things Do Live (1931)
- Behold the Tabernacle of God (1933)
- Hodie, Christus natus est (1935)
- Who Is She That Ascendeth (1937)
- O Saving Victim, SSA (1935)
- Look Down, O Lord, SSA (1935)
- Ave verum corpus (1943)
- Brébeuf and His Brethren (1948)
- I Will Lay Me down in Peace (1949)
- Christ Our Passover (1950)
- Grant Us Thy Light (1950)
- The Spirit of the Lord (1950)
- Gloria Deo per immensa saecula (1950)
- Great Is the Lord (1952)
- Te Deum Laudamus (1956)

=== Operas ===
- L'Ordre du bon temps (1928)
- Prince Charlie and Flora (1929)
- The Ayrshire Ploughman (?)
- Maureen [lost]
- Indian Christmas Play [lost]
- Transit through Fire (1942, written for Canadian Radio)
- Deirdre (1946, written for Canadian Radio, revised for stage in 1965)

=== Orchestral works ===
- Symphonic Poem (1908)
- Symphony No 1 in D minor (1936)
- Piano Concerto in C minor (1944), premiered by Canadian pianist Agnes Butcher
- Symphony No 2 in C minor (1948)
- Overture to an Unwritten Comedy (1951)
- Poem (for string orchestra) (1959)
- Elégie Héroïque (for band) (1960)

=== Recordings ===
- In the Heavenly Kingdom: Elora Festival Singers; Noel Edison, conducting; Matthew Larkin, organ; Joseph Schnurr, tenor. Naxos 8.557734 (2006).
- Organ Works: Patrick Wedd, organ; Saint-Jean-Baptiste Church, Montreal. Naxos 8.557375 (2005).
- Faire is the Heaven: The Choirs of the Church of St. Mary Magdalene, Toronto; directed by Giles Bryant. SMM7504
- Tenebrae Responsaries, Missae breves: The Choirs of the Church of St. Mary Magdalene, Toronto; Robert Hunter Bell, conducting. Virgin Classics/EMI, CDC 7243 5 45260 2 2 (1997).
- An Apostrophe to the Heavenly Hosts: Vancouver Chamber Choir; Jon Washburn, conducting. Virgin Classics/EMI, VC 5 45183 2 4 (1996).
- Masses and Motets: The Choirs of the Church of St. Mary Magdalene, Toronto; Robert Hunter Bell, conducting. Virgin Classics/EMI, VC 5 45109 2 (1994).
- Selected Organ Works: Dr. Francis Jackson, Organist. York Minster, England. Columbia Records LP-ML6198 (1960s).

== See also ==
- List of Canadian composers
- Music of Canada
