= Church of St. Aidan (Toronto) =

Coordinates: 43.672536°N 79.28538°W

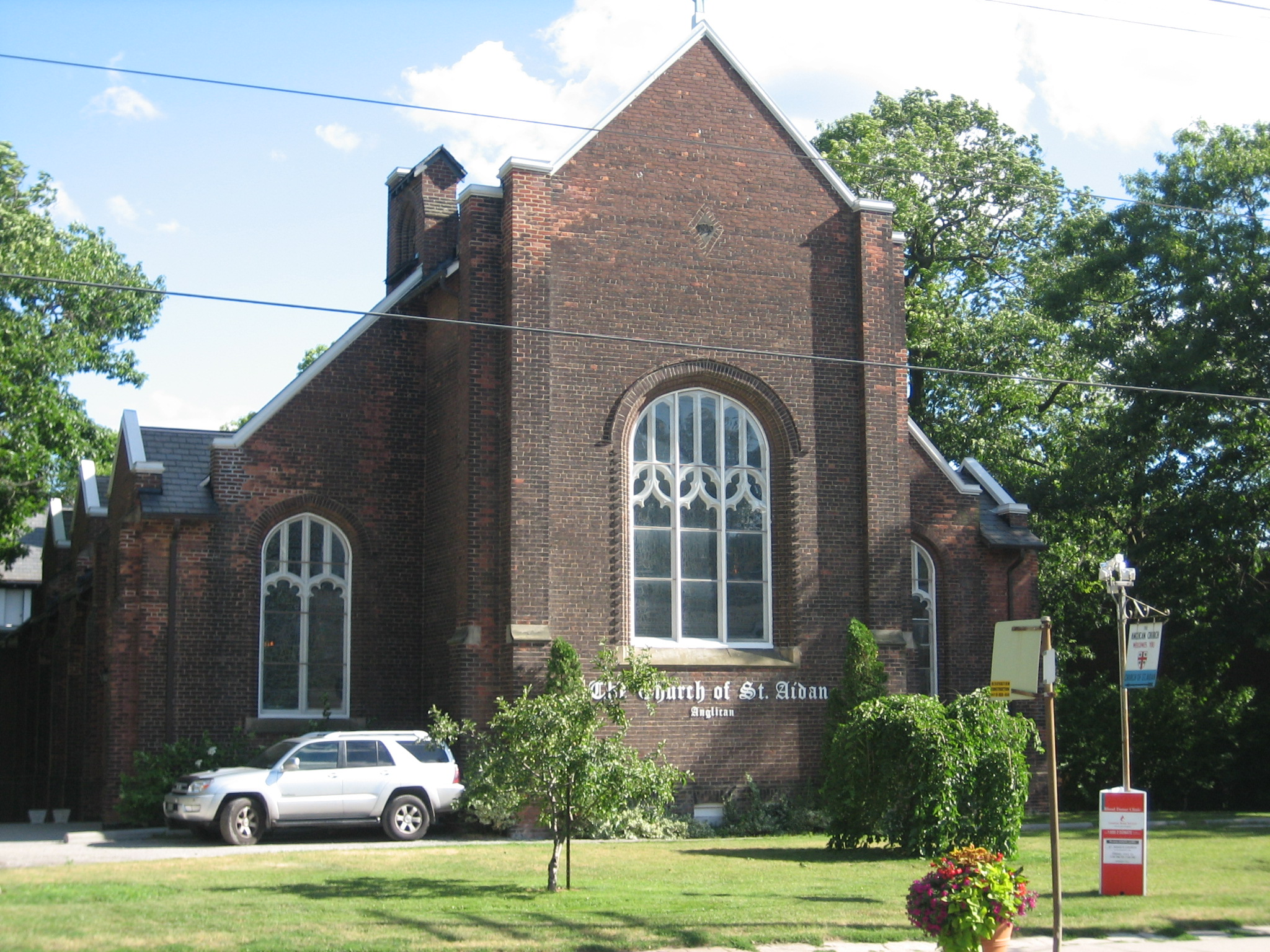
- The Church of St. Aidan at 2423 Queen Street East
- Church of St. Aidan (Toronto)
- Location: 2423 Queen Street East; Toronto, Ontario; M4E 1H6
- Denomination: Anglican
- Website: staidansinthebeach.com

History
- Founded: 1908
- Dedication: St. Aidan

Administration
- Province: Canada
- Diocese: Toronto
- Parish: Ontario

The Church of St. Aidan is an Anglican church in The Beaches neighbourhood of Toronto, Ontario, Canada. The church has about 400 members, and approximately 100 people attend on any Sunday.

The church's history begins with Pastor H. Dixon who set up a tent around 1880 to serve the residents of the small village in the area. When the streetcar stretched eastward and the area began to grow rapidly in the 1890s, the church remained housed in a tent, but one large enough to hold 500 people. A permanent church was finally established in 1907, and work on the church building was completed in 1908.

St. Aidan's has many pieces of liturgical art by the distinguished Canadian artist and late parishioner Doris McCarthy.

In 2006, the church became the centre of a controversy when the congregation under the Rev. Stephen Kirkegaard decided to participate in the Out of the Cold program to provide shelter to the homeless during the winter. The program takes place in various religious institutions across the city and helps provide extra space during the winter months when remaining outside can be deadly. St. Aidan's proposed providing beds for twelve people once a week. This sparked strenuous opposition from neighbours in the expensive Beaches area. Concerns about the homeless bringing crime and reducing property values in the neighbourhood prompted some local residents to try to get a court order to halt the program. Eventually, after a meeting was held to allay concerns, and critical publicity began to decry the objections, the program went ahead. In 2017, they plan to serve fifty for dinner, and host twenty-five homeless men and women for the night and breakfast.

== See also ==
- List of Anglican churches in Toronto
