= Christ Church Deer Park =

Coordinates: 43.69037°N 79.395238°W

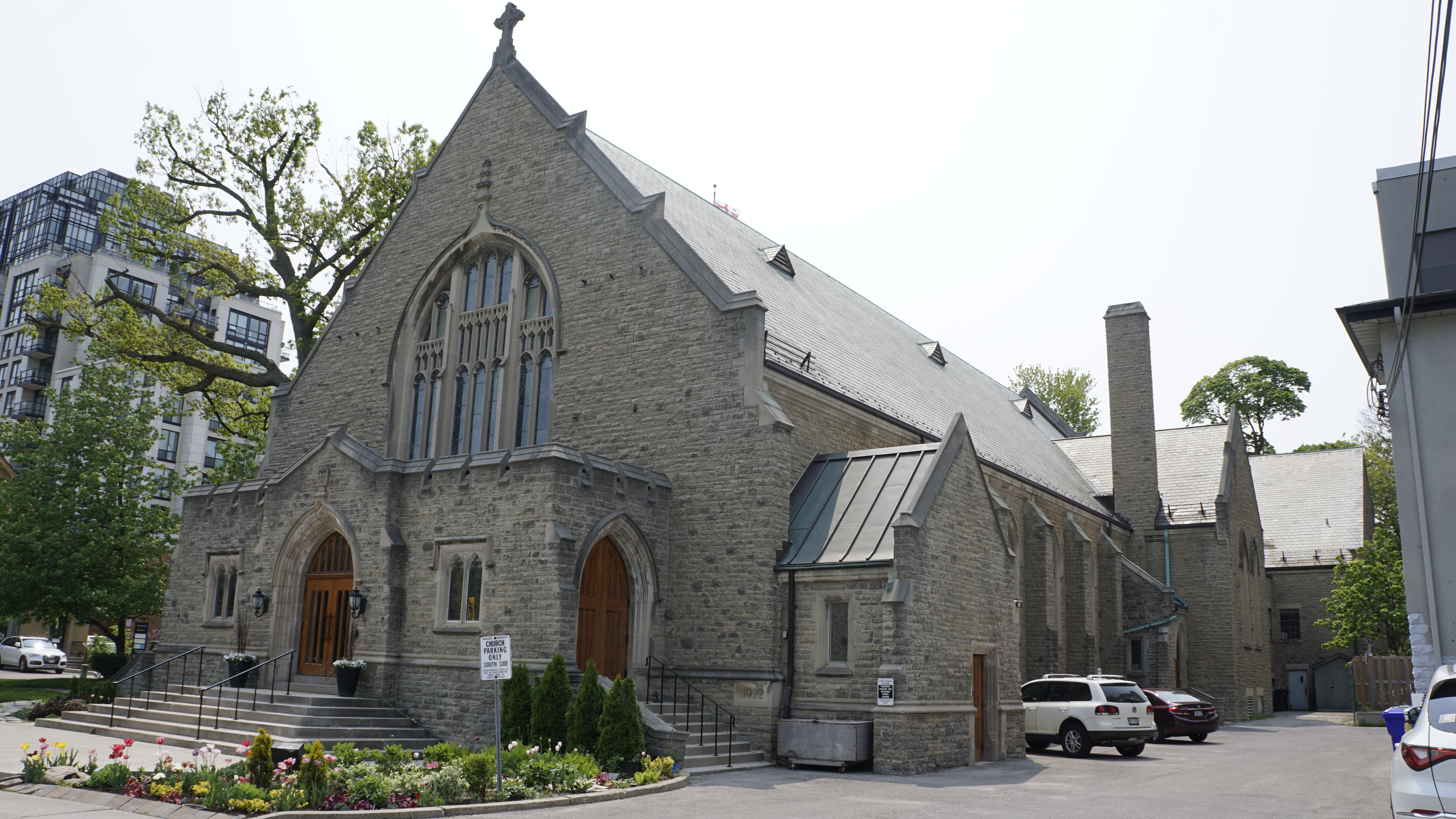
- The parish church in 2023
- Christ Church Deer Park
- Location: 1570 Yonge Street; Toronto, Ontario, Canada
- Denomination: Anglican Church of Canada
- Website: christchurchdeerpark.org

History
- Dedication: Christ

Architecture
- Architect(s): George, Moorhouse & King
- Style: Gothic Revival
- Completed: 1923

Administration
- Province: Ontario
- Diocese: Toronto

Clergy
- Rector: The Rev. Canon Cheryl Palmer

Christ Church Deer Park is a parish of the Anglican Church of Canada in the Diocese of Toronto. The parish church is located at 1570 Yonge Street, in the Deer Park area of Toronto, Ontario. Christ Church Deer Park is part of the Churches on the Hill, an ecumenical grouping of local congregations.

== History ==
Originally a mission of the parish of St. John's, York Mills, it was one of the earliest Anglican churches in North Toronto. While the mission congregation began meeting in Leaside in the 1860s, it later moved to the area of Deer Park. Today, the parish is known largely for its tradition of choral music.

In 1911, the parish of Grace Church on-the-Hill was carved out of the Christ Church parish boundaries. In 1970, the church was the site of the ordination to the priesthood of Andrew Hutchison, who would later serve as Primate of the Anglican Church of Canada.

On January 1, 2018, the Rev. Canon Cheryl Palmer became the Rector of Christ Church Deer Park. The previous Rector was the Rev. Canon Kevin Robertson, who was consecrated Area Bishop of York-Scarborough in January 2017.

== Gallery ==
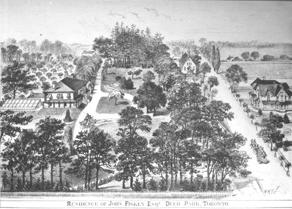
View of Deer Park (Lawton Park & Christ Church) looking north, from 1878 Atlas.

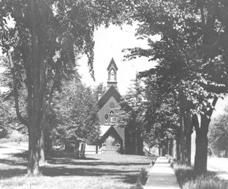
Deer Park's old Christ Church (Anglican) in Yonge St. Gore at Lawton Blvd, Toronto.

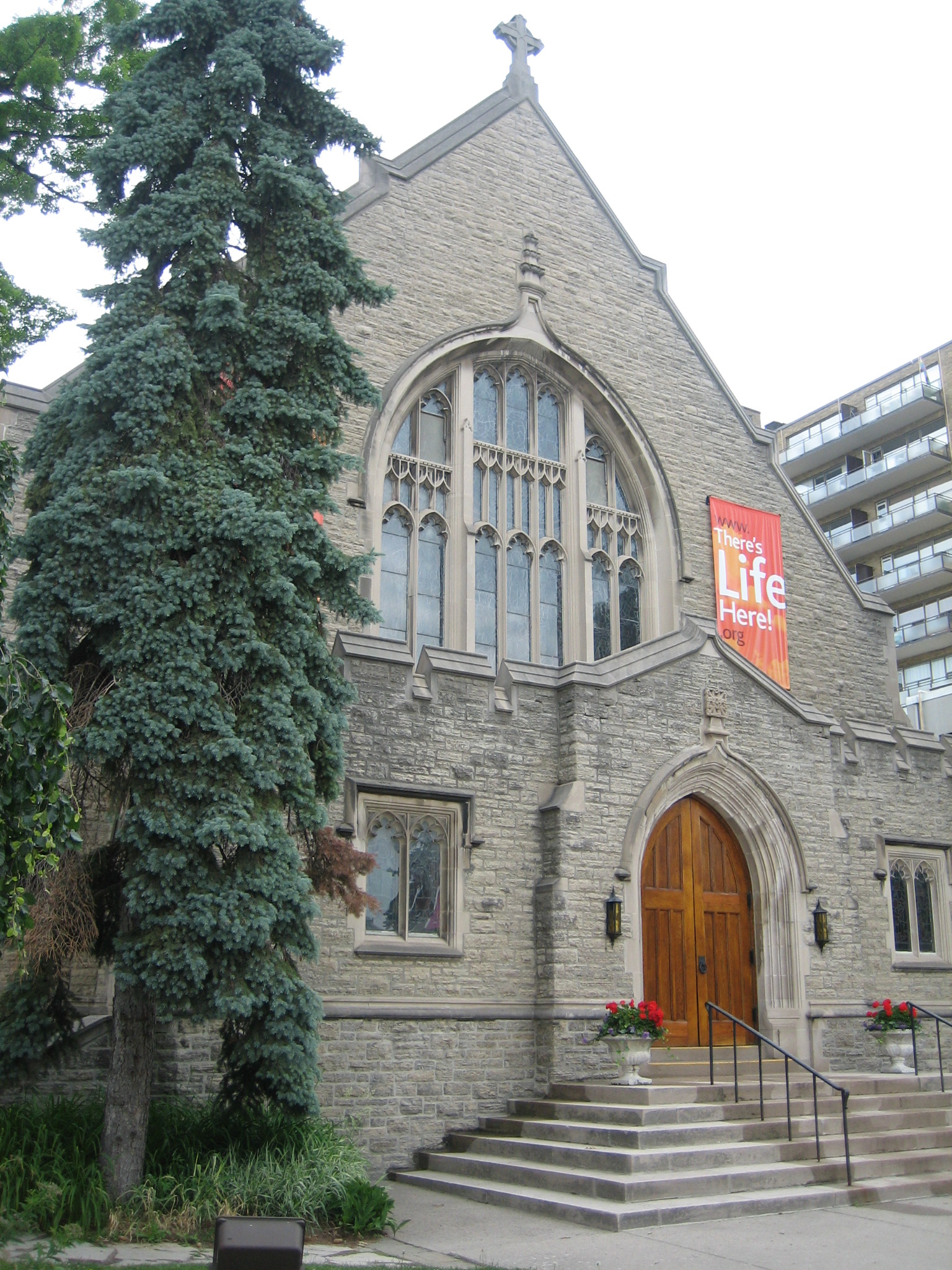
The parish church in 2008

== See also ==
- List of Anglican churches in Toronto
