= Bendale =

- Neighbourhood
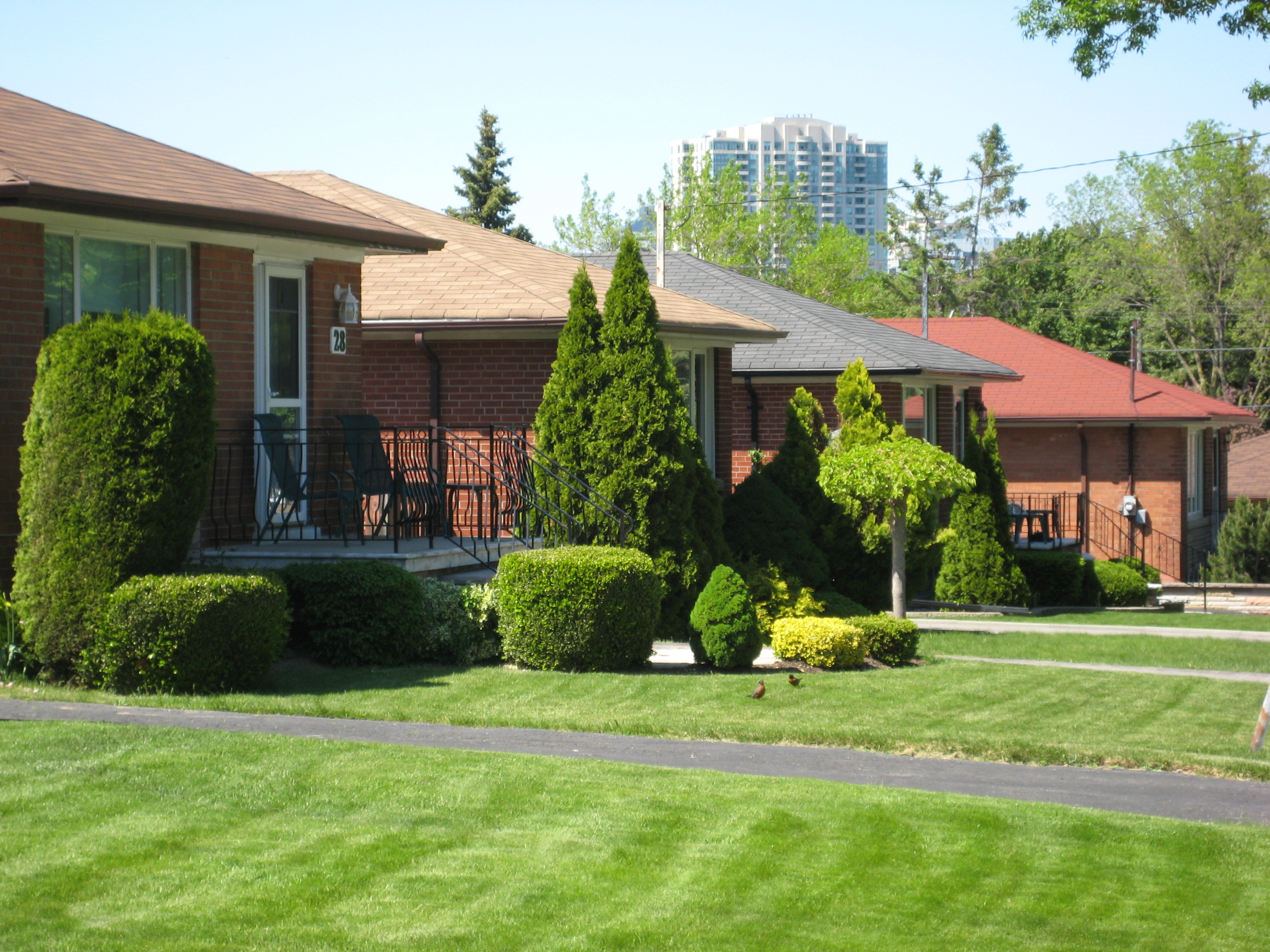
- Residences in Bendale

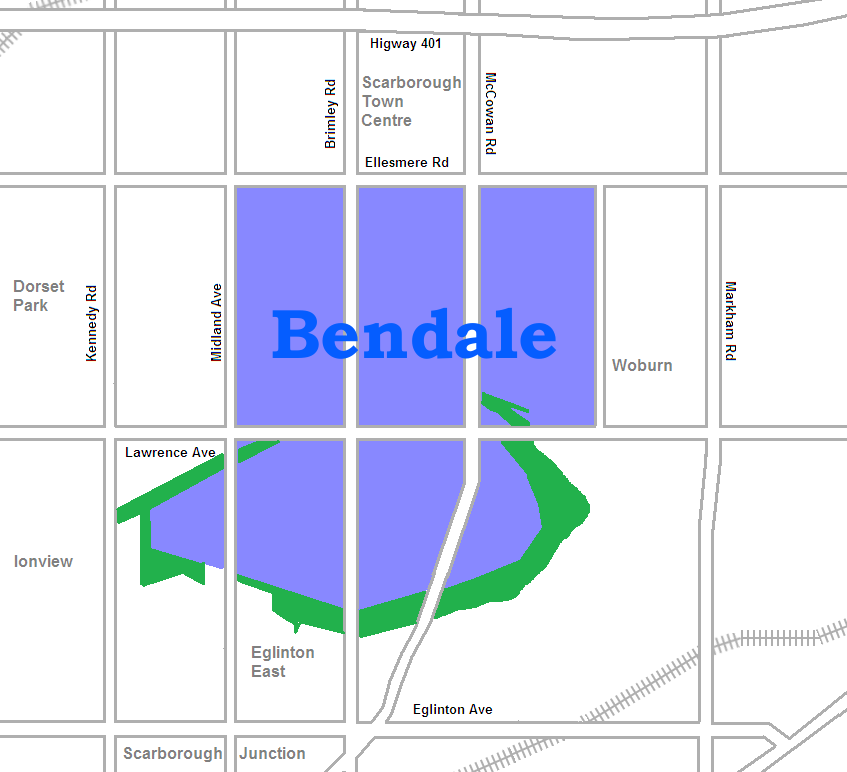
- Vicinity

- Location within Toronto
- Coordinates: 43.76°N 79.24°W
- Country: Canada
- Province: Ontario
- City: Toronto
- Established municipality: 1850 Scarborough Township
- Changed municipality: 1998 Toronto from Scarborough

Government
  - MP: Salma Zahid (Scarborough Centre)
  - MPP: Brad Duguid (Scarborough Centre)
  - Councillor: Glenn De Baeremaeker (Ward 38 Scarborough Centre)

Bendale, also called Cedarbrae and Midland Park, is a residential neighbourhood in the eastern part of Toronto, Ontario, Canada. It is located in the former suburb of Scarborough. It is centred on the intersection of Lawrence Avenue East and Brimley Road. Its boundaries, as defined by the City, are Midland Avenue from Lawrence, north to Highway 401, east to McCowan, south to Lawrence, east to West Highland Creek, south-west along West Highland Creek, then follow several side streets parallel to the Creek, north to Midland Avenue. The area north of Ellesmere is typically considered the Scarborough City Centre district, and is not considered in this neighbourhood article.

Bendale was shortened from the original name Benlomond in 1881, which was named for Ben Lomond.

== Description ==
The area is primarily residential. Of the residential dwellings, 39% are single-detached homes and 42% are apartment buildings. The population, as recorded in 2011 was 27,876. The area is ethnically diverse, like much of Toronto, but prior to 2018, has had a higher influx of immigrants from European Nations than the rest of Scarborough Center Area. In 2019, the most common mother tongue and language spoken at home was English language.

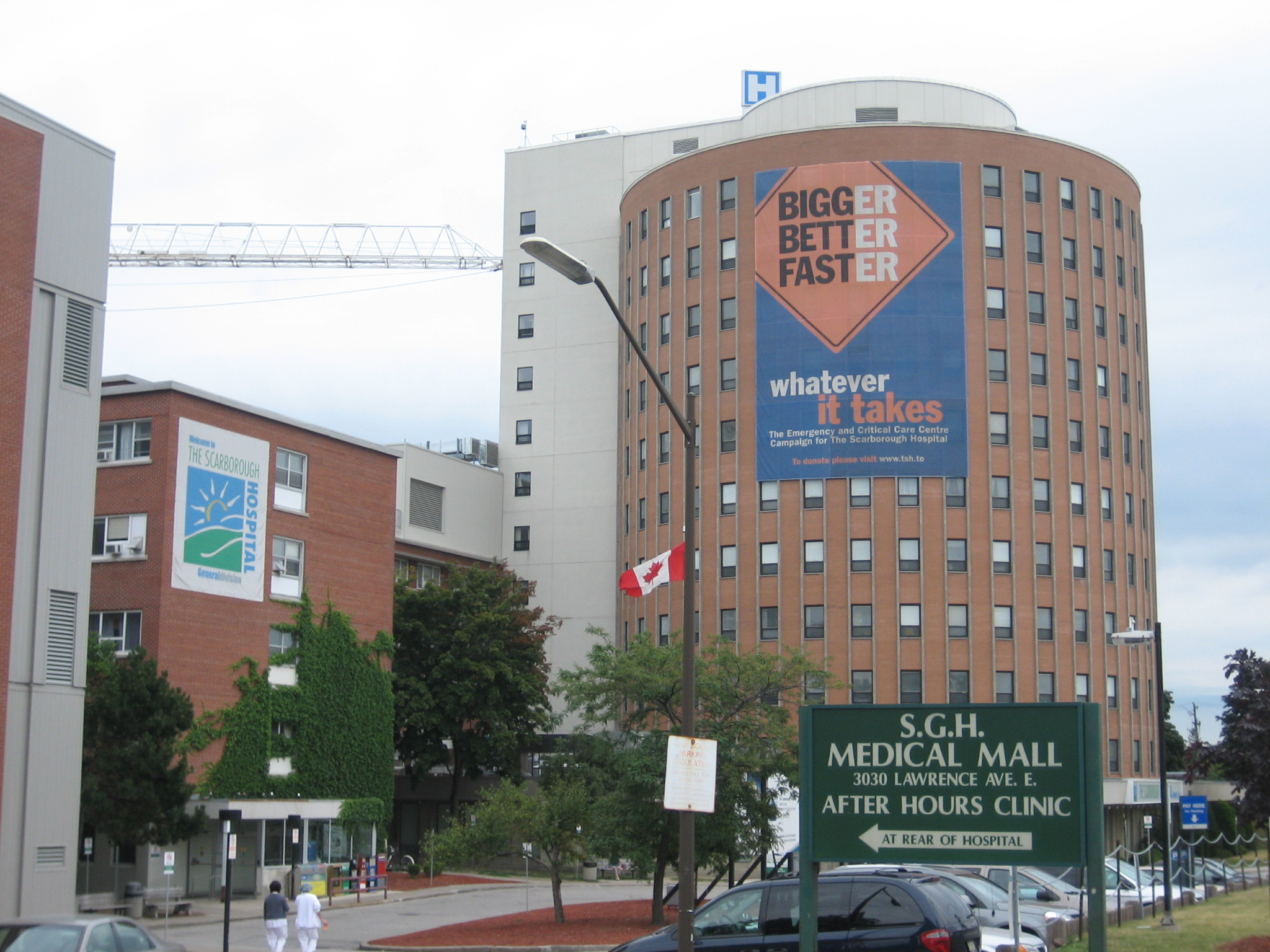
The general campus of the Scarborough Health Network is located in Bendale.

Landmarks in the area include Scarborough Health Network, General Campus at Lawrence and McCowan. The Scarborough Museum is located at Brimley north of Lawrence.

The area north of Lawrence Avenue between McCowan and Bellamy Roads, most of the street names begin with Ben. Examples include:

- Benleigh, Benshire and Ben Nevis Drives
- Benfrisco, Benhur and Benorama Crescents
- Benadair and Benprice Courts
- Ben Stanton and Ben Doran Boulevards.

Ben Stanton was the builder of the "Ben Jungle" and celebrated his 90th birthday with neighbours of the jungle.

== Education ==
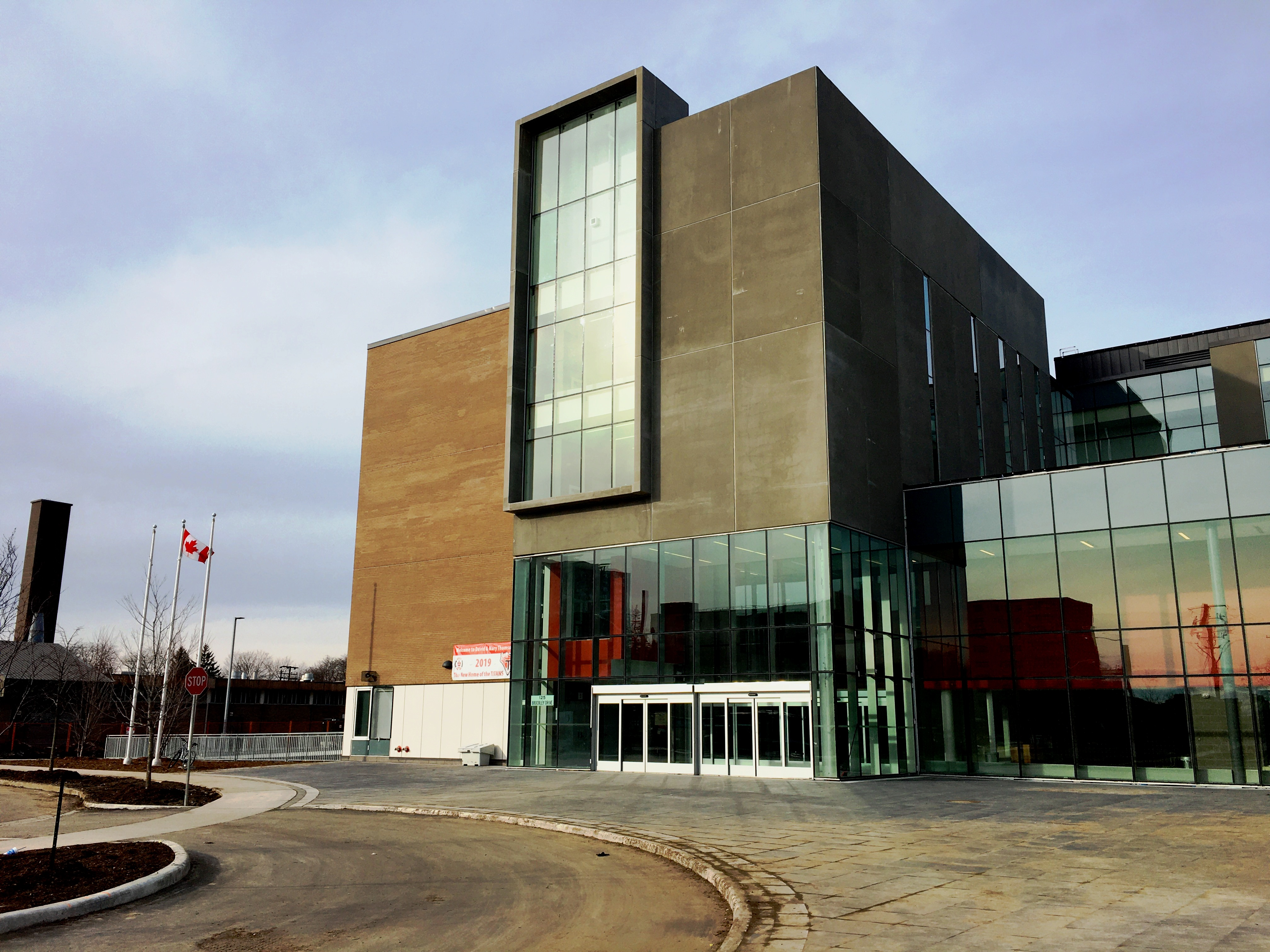
David and Mary Thomson Collegiate Institute is a public secondary school located in Bendale.

Two public school boards operate in schools in Bendale, the Toronto Catholic District School Board (TCDSB), and the Toronto District School Board (TDSB). TCDSB is a public separate school board, whereas TDSB is a public secular school board. In addition to TCDSB and TDSB, two French first language public school boards, Conseil scolaire Viamonde (CSV) and Conseil scolaire catholique MonAvenir (CSCM) also provide schooling to students in Bendale, although neither operate a school in Bendale. CSV is a secular public school board, whereas CSCM is a public separate school board.

TCDSB and TDSB operates several public separate elementary schools in Bendale. Elementary schools in Bendale include:

- Bendale Junior Public School
- Charles Gordon Senior Public School
- Donwood Park (Junior) Public School
- Highbrook Senior Public School
- Edgewood Public School
- Knob Hill Public School was constructed in 1956 and serves Kindergarten to Grade 8 with approximately 500 students and 50 staff from over 30 countries and speaking 20 different languages. From 1969 to 2011, Knob Hill was a feeder school to John McCrae.
- Hunter's Glen Junior Public School
- North Bendale Public School
- St. Andrew's Public School serves Junior Kindergarten to Grade 8 and was built in 1959 on the estate of David and Mary Thomson, who were among the first settlers in Scarborough. The name honours their Scottish heritage. The school was branded as a junior school from 1968 to 1985 when Highbrook Senior school operated.
- St. Albert Separate School
- St. Andrew Public School
- St. Richard Catholic School
- St. Rose of Lima Catholic School
- St. Victor Catholic School

TCDSB does not operate a secondary school in the neighbourhood, although TCDSB secondary students residing in Bendale attend TCDSB secondary schools located in adjacent neighbourhoods. Many attend several high schools such as Mary Ward, Francis Libermann, Cardinal Newman, St. Joan of Arc (Jean Vanier), St. John Paul II, Neil McNeil/Notre Dame and Senator O'Connor. Along with the TDSB, it operates two secondary schools in the neighbourhood, David and Mary Thomson Collegiate Institute with the former merged with nearby Bendale Business and Technical Institute in 2019 and Alternative Scarborough Education 1. In addition to secondary schools, TDSB also operates several institutions in Bendale that provides primary education.

== See also ==
- List of neighborhoods in Scarborough
