= St. John's, York Mills =

Anglican church in York Mills, Toronto

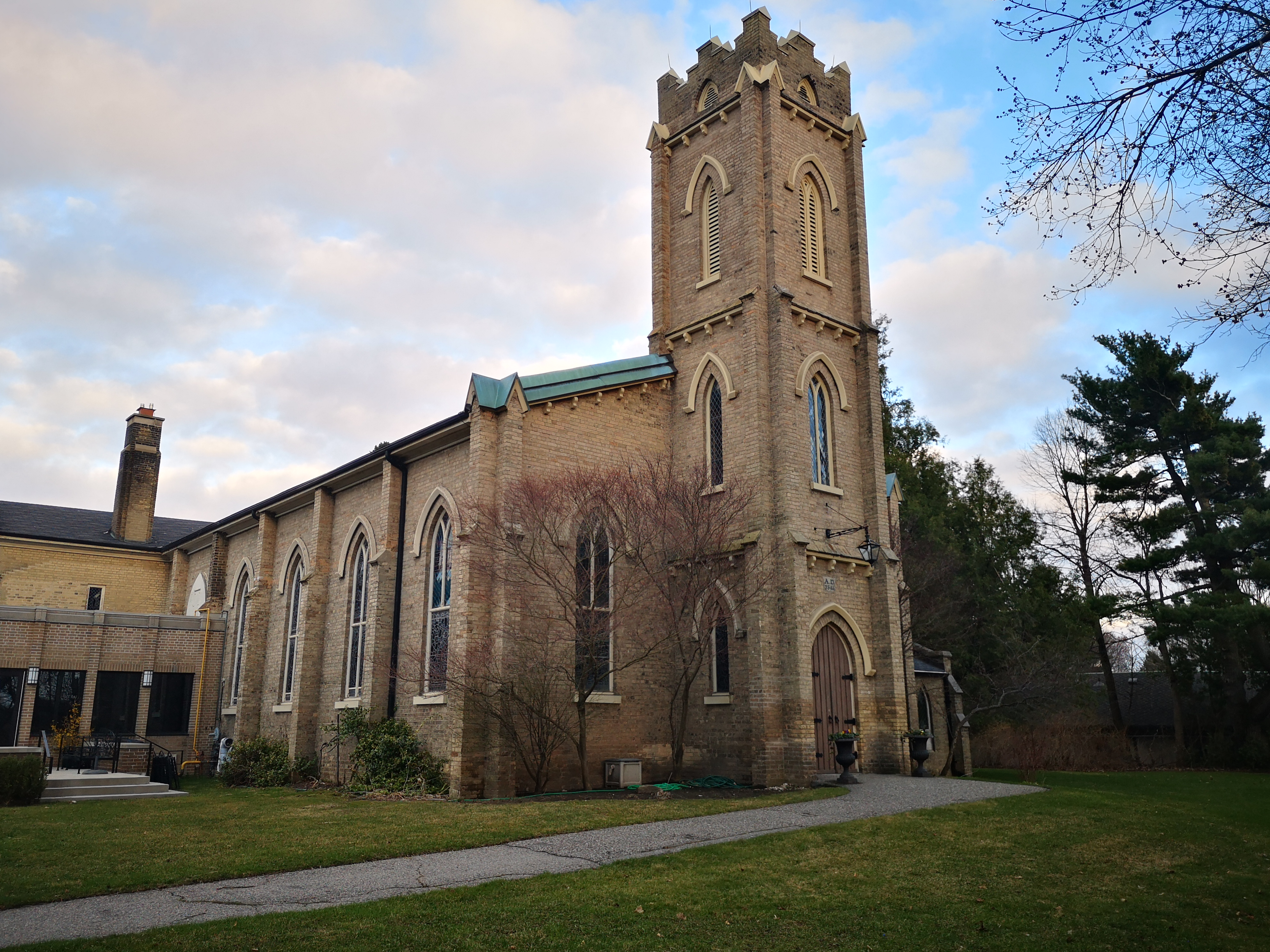
- St. John's, York Mills
- 43.747141°N 79.405235°W
- Address: 19 Don Ridge Drive; Toronto, Ontario; M2P 1H3
- Denomination: Anglican Church of Canada
- Website: www.sjym.ca

History
- Founded: 1816

Architecture
- Architect: John George Howard
- Style: Gothic Revival
- Years built: 1843–1844

Administration
- Province: Ontario
- Diocese: Toronto

St. John's, York Mills, is a historic Anglican church in the York Mills neighbourhood of the North York district of Toronto, Ontario, Canada. Founded in 1816, it is the second oldest Anglican church in Toronto. The present Gothic Revival church building dates from 1843 and was designed by architect John George Howard.

== History ==
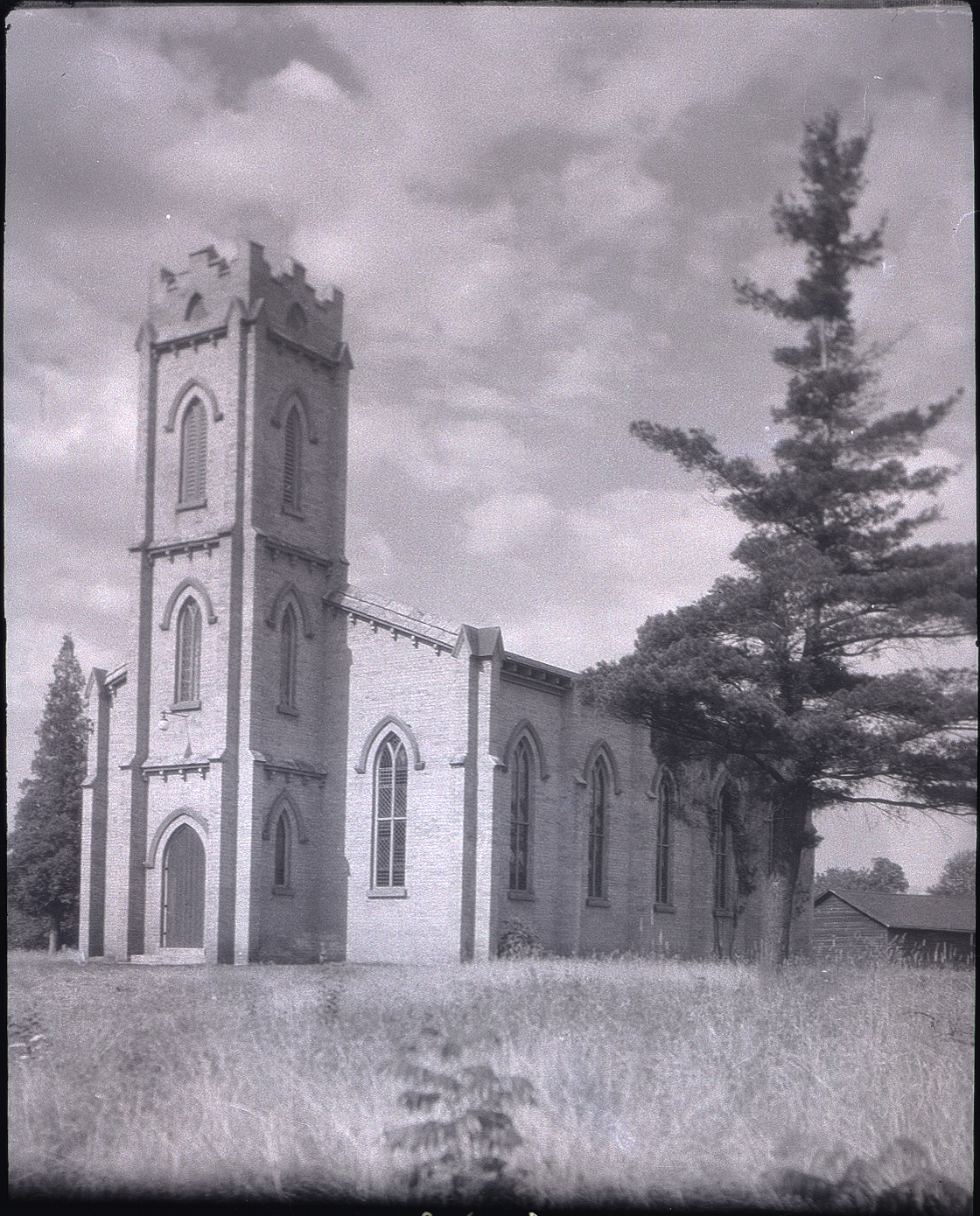
St. John's, York Mills, 1923

Services for what became the congregation of St. John's, York Mills, began in the Bedford Park home of Seneca Ketchum (1772–1850). The area was served by army chaplains and visiting clergy. The first permanent clergyman in York was the Rev. George Okill Stuart. After Stuart's departure, the Rev. Dr. John Strachan, Rector of St. James Church and later 1st Bishop of Toronto, occasionally conducted services for Ketchum's group.

Services were later held in the local schoolhouse until the parishioners signed an agreement dated March 16, 1816, to build a permanent church building. Joseph Shepard donated a parcel of land fronting Yonge Street for the construction of the church. The cornerstone was laid on September 17, 1816, by the Hon. Francis Gore, Lieutenant Governors of Upper Canada, and the Rev. Dr. Strachan. The building was complete by August 1817. It was not consecrated until June 17, 1829, in the presence of the Rt Rev. Charles Stewart, 2nd Bishop of Quebec, and the Ven. Archdeacon George J. Mountain, later Stewart's successor as 3rd Bishop of Quebec. The first incumbent of St. John's was the Rev. Charles Mathews, named by letters patent in 1836. With the wooden frame church deteriorating, the Rev. Alexander Sanson revived the building fund in 1842 to fund the construction of a new building. The church employed Upper Canada's leading architect of the time, John George Howard. The church was constructed in white burnt brick by Henry G. Papst for £632. On May 30, 1843, Bishop Strachan again laid the cornerstone. Strachan returned again to open the completed church on June 11, 1844.

St. Paul's, Bloor Street, established in 1842, Christ Church, Deer Park, established in the 1860s, and St. Clement's, Eglinton, established in 1891, all began as missions of St. John's.

Later additions and extensions to the church include the Parish Hall, built in 1925 and expanded in 1931. A new Parish Hall and cloister was dedicated to the memory of Lieut. Col. A. J. van Nostrand in May 1939. After World War II, the congregation had outgrown its building and the church was expanded between 1948–1949. The newly expanded church was dedicated on October 13, 1949.

== Organ ==
St. John's, York Mills, is known for its barrel organ. Money for the organ was collected by a Miss Throne and it arrived from England in 1846. It was the church's only instrument until a cottage organ was installed in the 1860s and finally a pipe organ in 1928.

== Cemetery ==
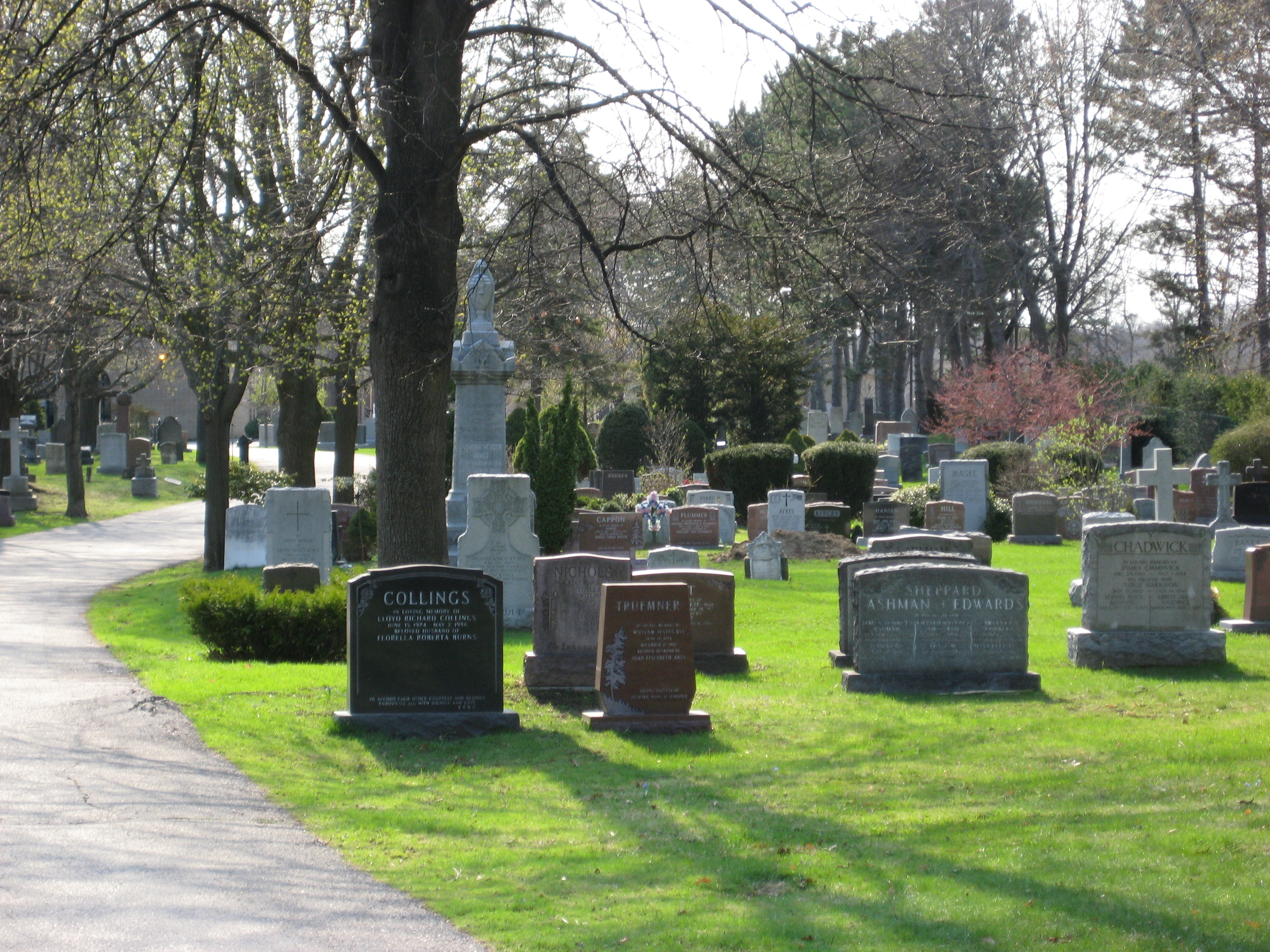
The church cemetery

The first burial in the churchyard was in 1806 of the seven-year-old grandson of Cornelius van Nostrand who had come to York Mills as a Loyalist in 1797. Many of the early settlers of the area and participants in the Upper Canada Rebellion are buried in the church cemetery. Notable internments include the Rt Rev. Archbishop Derwyn Owen, Primate of All Canada, Lionel Conacher, Walter Seymour Allward and a memorial to the van Nostrand family.

== See also ==
- List of Anglican churches in Toronto
- List of oldest buildings and structures in Toronto

== References and bibliography ==
=== Bibliography ===
- Graham, Muriel Audrey (1966). 150 years at St. John's, York Mills. Toronto: General Publishing Co.
