= Lynn Donoghue =

Canadian artist (1953–2003)

- Born: April 20, 1953; Red Lake, Ontario
- Died: November 22, 2003 (aged 50); Toronto, Ontario
- Known for: Portrait painting
- Elected: Royal Canadian Academy 1991

Lynn Donoghue RCA (April 20, 1953 – November 22, 2003) was a painter, known for her portraits.

== Career ==
Lynn Donoghue, who was born in Red Lake, Ontario, in 1953, was trained at H. B. Beal Secondary School, London, Ontario, where Herb Ariss and Paterson Ewen were among her teachers, graduating in 1972. She began to exhibit her work professionally in 1973.

Throughout her career, she championed portrait and figural work. After her first trip to Europe in 1979, she became more interested in what she considered her heritage as a portrait painter of past masters such as Velasquez, quoting from their work in her own way. Donoghue largely chose her subjects, many of them her friends, resulting in a body of work which explored the cultural community in Toronto and beyond.

Donoghue's work was often large in scale, with bright colour applied directly onto the canvas in thin layers of paint so that they have a translucent effect.

== Exhibitions ==
Between 1973 and 1999, Donoghue held over 20 solo exhibitions, and her work appeared in numerous group exhibitions across Canada, the United States, and the United Kingdom. Noteworthy were her shows in 1976, a series of male nudes for exhibit in Cobourg refused by the Agnes Etherington Art Centre in Kingston but then shown at 'A' Space in Toronto, her show in 1984 at Mount Saint Vincent Art Gallery in Halifax, Nova Scotia titled The Cult of Personality: Portraits by Lynn Donoghue, and Lynn Donoghue: The Last Supper, a posthumous show held in 2005 at MacLaren Art Centre, Barrie, Ontario.

== Public collections ==
Her work is represented in numerous public collections across Canada, including the Art Gallery of Hamilton, Mount St. Vincent University Art Gallery, Halifax, Nova Scotia: Museum London and McIntosh Gallery, University of Western Ontario, both in London, Ontario; the Robert McLaughlin Gallery, Oshawa, Ontario; the Vancouver Art Gallery; and the Botswana National Museum, in Gamborone, Botswana.

== Awards ==
She received the Queen's Golden Jubilee Medal for outstanding service to the community in 2002. In 1991, Donoghue was elected a member of the Royal Canadian Academy of Arts.

Donoghue held teaching positions across Ontario from the 1970s to the 1990s, at the University of Guelph; York University, Toronto; Sheridan College, Oakville; the Ontario College of Art, Toronto; Sir Sandford Fleming College, and the Haliburton School of Fine Arts, Haliburton. Early in her career, she was involved in children's programming at a precursor to Museum London.

== Death ==
She died in Toronto, Ontario, on November 22, 2003 from a diabetic insulin reaction. A silent auction dedicated to her memory of 75 works by artists across Canada was held posthumously at the Gladstone Hotel in Toronto.
