= Sylvia Hahn =

Canadian artist

- Born: May 2, 1911; Toronto, Ontario, Canada
- Died: January 2, 2001 (aged 89); Whitby, Ontario, Canada
- Education: Ontario College of Art
- Known for: Sculpture, Painting
- Notable work: Royal Ontario Museum murals
- Awards: Governor-General’s Medal for Achievement; 1932

Sylvia Hahn (2 May 1911 – 2 January 2001) was a Canadian artist and head of the art department which is at the Royal Ontario Museum.

== Biography ==
Born on May 2, 1911, in Toronto, Ontario, Sylvia Hahn was known for her uncanny mastery of many crafts. Called a Renaissance woman, Hahn worked in many mediums ranging from altar paintings to metal work. She was the recipient of the Governor-General's Medal for Achievement (1932) and she spent most of her life working at the Royal Ontario Museum as head of the art department (1934 to 1976). She created a total of eleven murals for the institution.

== Early life ==
Born to artists Gustav Hahn and Ellen Smith in Toronto, Ontario, Hahn came from a creative family. Her father was an instructor at the Ontario College of Art and her mother, a sculptor and painter in her own right, was his pupil. Together they had three daughters, of whom Sylvia was the youngest. Her sister, Hilda Hahn, studied fine art and worked as an illustrator while her uncles, Emanuel and Paul Hahn, worked as sculptors and a musician, respectively. She trained under her father until she attended the Ontario College of Art in 1929.

== Education ==
After graduating from Havergal College (1917–1927), she attended the University of Toronto for one year (1928) before enrolling at the Ontario College of Art (1929–1932). Her education at the OCA resulted in a series of awards and honours, which led to her being appointed an associate of the institution upon graduation. She was then offered a job sketching artifacts for the catalogue records of the Royal Ontario Museum by its director, Charles Trick Currelly, which she accepted.

== Personal life ==
When not producing art, she taught metalwork, was a judge for several craft competitions, and published books about nature studies and the cats she owned.>

== Artistic career ==
Hahn worked in various media and was especially known for her murals and wood engravings. She was a member of the Ontario Society of Artists, the Society of Canadian Painter-Etchers and Engravers, and the Toronto Metal Crafts Guild, among others. Her religious artworks, which include altar pieces and sculptures, can be seen in more than fifteen churches across Canada. Some of her mural work can be seen at Havergal College school for girls in Toronto and at Emmanuel College at the University of Toronto. She also illustrated books and was nominated as an outstanding woman of the Province of Ontario in 1975.

== Death ==
Hahn died on January 2, 2001, in Whitby, Ontario.
