= St. Clement's School =

Day school in Ontario, Canada

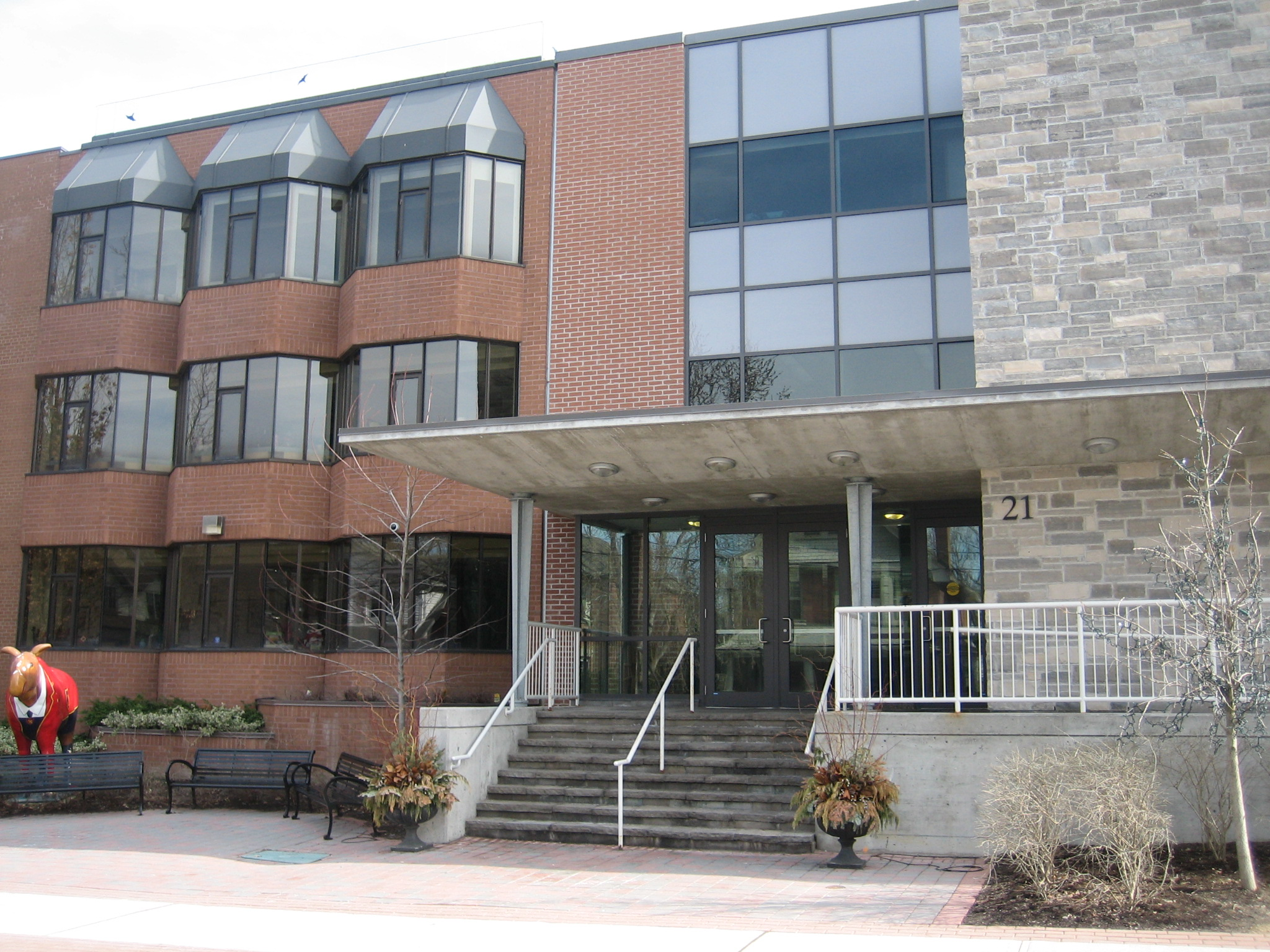

Location
- Toronto, Ontario, Canada; 43.71286°N 79.40034°W

Information
- School type: Independent day school
- Founded: 1901
- Principal: Martha Perry
- Grades: 1 to 12
- Enrollment: 440
- Average class size: 21
- Website: www.scs.on.ca

St. Clement's School (SCS) is an Anglican independent school for girls in Toronto, Ontario, Canada. The school was founded in 1901 by Canon Thomas Wesley Powell, Rector of St. Clement's Church, and was originally co-ed, but switched to being all-girls after the First World War. Students at SCS are often referred to as Clementines.

In 2006, the school completed a new addition to the building which doubled the size of the school: the addition was funded by the Bigger Blazer Campaign. The renovation included a new gym, performance hall, library and many other improvements.

In 2024, the school completed an additional renovation in which they added additional spaces equal to about half of the size of the existing building. Similarly to the renovation in 2006, the renovation was mainly funded by alumni organizations and parent donations. The new renovation includes a renovated and enlarged library, a computer and robotics lab, a cafeteria, and additional working spaces.

== Notable alumni ==
- Adrienne Arsenault, foreign correspondent for the Canadian Broadcasting Corporation
- Claudia Dey, novelist, playwright and columnist
- Helena Jaczek, politician and physician
- Renuka Jeyapalan, film and television director
- Sheila Heti, novelist, playwright, and author
- Margaret MacMillan, historian, provost, professor, and author
- Jodi White, philanthropist and political operative

== See also ==
- Education in Ontario
- List of secondary schools in Ontario
- Saint Clements Church
- Yonge-Eglinton
