= George Dixon (organ designer) =

George Dixon (1870–1950) was an organ designer who influenced British organ tonal design in the first half of the twentieth century.

Dixon was born in St Bees, Cumberland in 1870. He was interested in organ playing from an early age and became a close friend of Francis J. Livesey, who arrived in the town to become organist at St Bees Priory in 1887. Dixon assisted Livesey in the design of the new organ at St. Bees, which was built by Henry Willis and completed in 1899. Dixon later designed the large organ at St Nicholas's church in Whitehaven. In 1909 he designed an instrument for St. James', Whitehaven, and went on to advise on many large organ projects, including those at Carlisle and Norwich cathedrals, several Cambridge colleges, and the Royal Albert Hall.
