= Henry Bowyer Lane =

English architect

Henry Bowyer Joseph Lane
- Born: 1817; Corfu, United States of the Ionian Islands
- Died: 1878 (aged 60–61); Birchfield, Birmingham, England
- Education: Blundell's School
- Occupation: Architect
- Buildings: Osgoode Hall; Toronto's second City Hall

Henry Bowyer Joseph Lane (1817–1878) was an English architect who worked in Toronto from c. 1841 to 1847.

Lane was born to Henry Bower Lane, a Royal Artillery Captain and Elizabeth Lacey in 1817 and moved to Devon, England after 1819.

Lane's education included time at Blundell's School in Tiverton and subsequent professional training in England before he emigrated to Canada in 1841, living first in Cobourg, Upper Canada, and then in Toronto (around 1843–1844).

One of Lane's most significant contributions is Osgoode Hall, namely the west and central wings from 1844 to 1846. He designed and oversaw the construction of the incorporated city of Toronto's second city hall in 1844. Lane's limited commissions outside of Toronto, in Niagara-on-the-Lake and Cobourg, were never as grand as his work in Toronto.

During his time in Toronto, Lane married Lucy Anne Sharpe in 1844, and they left the city in 1847.

He is known to have been in the Colony of Victoria, Australia thereafter. In the Ovens Directory for the year 1857, (State Library of New South Wales), he is listed as Henry Bowyer Lane Esq., Subwarden and Chinese Protector and Magistrate for the Yachandandah Creek Goldfield, near Bright. He was still in the Victorian Alps in 1862, because his fine watercolour, The Buckland near the Camp, clearly signed and dated May 1862, is held by the State Library of Victoria (Australia). It shows the Buckland Hotel and the Buckland Post Office, and eight Chinese gold miners crossing the bridge over the Buckland River during the Australian gold rush. A European man (maybe the postmaster, William McKay) is sitting on the steps of the Post Office, chatting to a European woman. The Buckland River goldfield was near the present town of Bright in the Australian Alps.

Lane is believed to have died in Birmingham, England in 1878.

== Works ==
Building	Year completed	Location	Notes	Image
Diocesan Theological Institute/Haskell House	1842	174 Green Street and Queen Street, Cobourg, Ontario	College of Theology for Alexander Bethune, Anglican Bishop of Toronto	
St. Peter's Church original facade and tower	1844	240 College Street, Cobourg, Ontario	1st church 1844–1854 Demolished in 1854	
Brock's Monument	1843	Queenston Heights, Niagara Falls, Ontario	Plans to rebuild with a submission or proposal that did not win	
Little Trinity Anglican Church	1843	425 King Street East, Corktown, Toronto	Gothic Revival church with polychromatic brickwork.	Little Trinity Anglican Church
Church of St. George the Martyr	1845	197 John Street, Toronto	Gothic Revival church. Remnants survived a 1955 fire.	
City Hall and New Market	1845	Front Street at Market Street, Toronto	Georgian architecture. Toronto's second city hall, John Wilson Siddall incorporated into St. Lawrence Market South in 1899-192 with the centre block retained without the cupola and pediment.	Henry Bowyer Lane's Toronto City Hall Toronto, Ontario
St. Mark's Church, Niagara-on-the-Lake	1845	41 Byron Street, Niagara-on-the-Lake, Ontario	Ecclesiastical furnishings only	
St Paul's Church Anglican, Kingston	1846	137 Queen Street, Kingston	Plans only	
Osgoode Hall	1846	Toronto	Central and west wings. Palladian architecture.	
Church of the Holy Trinity	1847	Trinity Square, Toronto	Gothic Revival	
Enoch Turner School	1848	106 Trinity Street, Toronto	Gothic Revival school house is believed to have been designed by Lane, who had left Toronto in 1847	
