= Enoch Turner School =

Coordinates: 43.6529°N 79.3615°W

Enoch Turner Schoolhouse
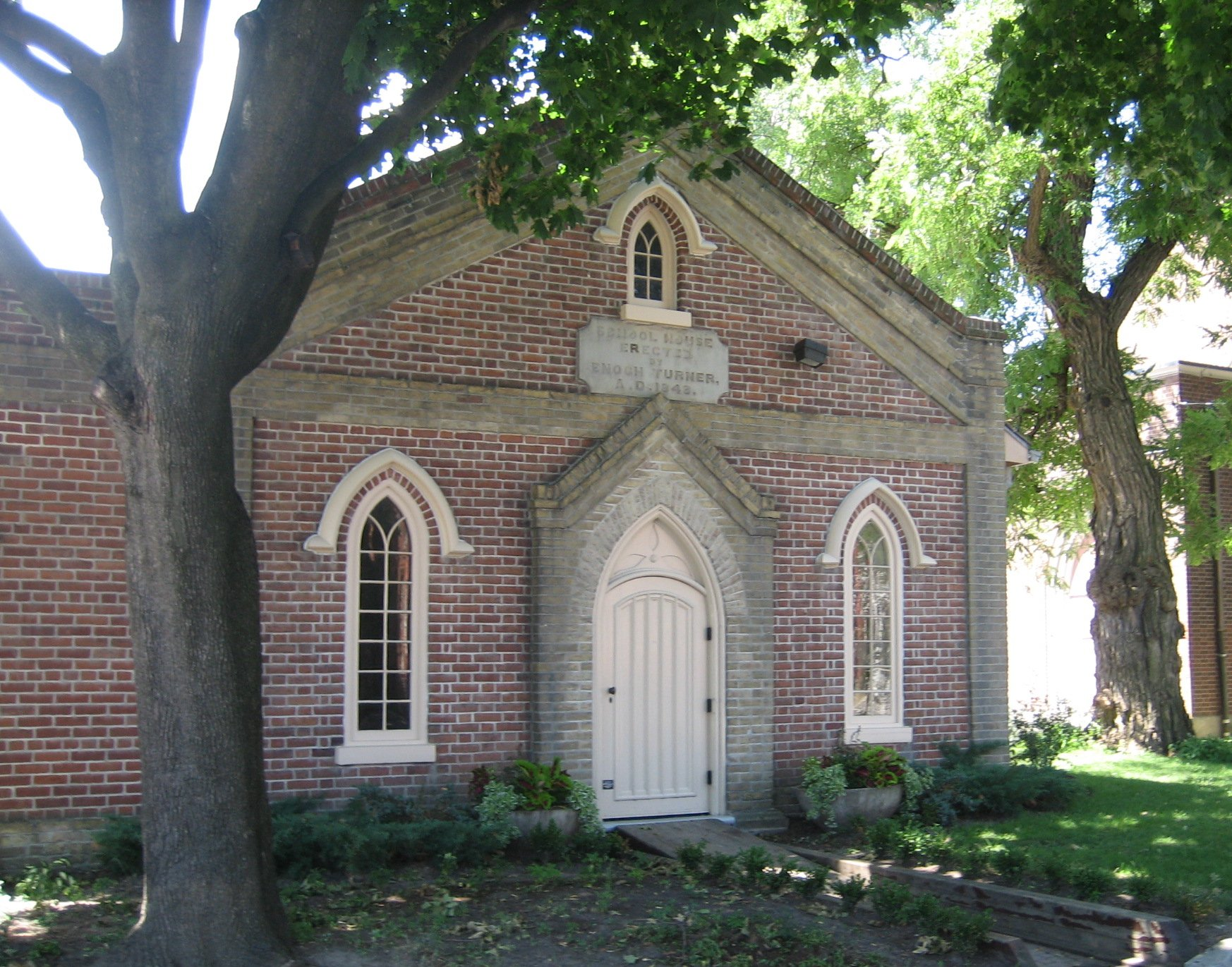
- Established: 1848
- Location: 106 Trinity Street, Toronto, Ontario; Canada
- Type: Ontario Heritage Trust historic site and museum
- Website: www.enochturnerschoolhouse.ca

Ontario Heritage Act
- Type: Part IV - Property of cultural heritage value or interest
- Designated: 2000

Enoch Turner Schoolhouse is a historic site and museum in Toronto, Ontario, Canada. It is a former school owned by the Ontario Heritage Trust. The school was built in 1848 when it was known as the Ward School. The building is located at 106 Trinity Street between King Street East and Eastern Avenue. It is the oldest school standing in the city.

== History ==
The original one-room school was established in 1848 by Enoch Turner (1792–1866), a wealthy brewer and philanthropist, to educate the children in the poor neighbourhood surrounding his brewery. Because many of the area's immigrant families were from County Cork in Ireland, the neighbourhood became known as Corktown – a nickname it still carries today.

Turner supplied the funds to construct the schoolhouse and the land was donated by the adjacent Little Trinity Church. In 1849, the school opened with space for 240 pupils and Turner paid for its operation for three years. It was the first free school in Toronto.

Enoch Turner founded his free school following the Canadian Common Schools Act of 1846. After the act was passed, municipalities had the power to raise funds for public education through taxation. However, city officials were unwilling to introduce such taxes, and as a result, all schools that benefited from any kind of public support were closed for a year. This prompted Turner to establish the school, which was a critical catalyst in the development of a provincially supported free school system.

In 1850, school trustees were elected by the public to oversee educational funding. Free public education officially began at the Trinity Street School in 1851. Daily class size ranged from 80 to 90 students of varying academic levels. There were several different instructors employed by the school trustees, including Jane Henderson, a Scottish immigrant who taught from 1858 to 1859. In 1859, classes were relocated to the nearby Palace Street School at Palace Street (now Front Street East) and Cherry Street. The Trinity Street School and property were returned to Little Trinity parish, and from the 1860s to the 1960s the school served as a parish hall and Sunday school for the church. In addition, the School and hall served as a recruiting station during the Second Boer War and World War I, and a soup kitchen during the Great Depression. Due to a severe fire at Little Trinity Anglican Church in 1961, the parish could no longer afford to care for the school building, and it fell into disrepair. By the late 1960s, the building was slated for demolition.

To protect the building and raise funds for its restoration, a group of citizens together with members of the Little Trinity Church congregation set up the Enoch Turner Schoolhouse Foundation on October 8, 1970. The former Trinity Street School was renamed Enoch Turner Schoolhouse. After extensive interior and exterior renovations, the schoolhouse opened as a living history site and conference and reception centre. In March 2008, the ownership and operation of the schoolhouse were transferred to the Ontario Heritage Trust from the Foundation. The Enoch Turner Schoolhouse Foundation continues as an independent charitable organization, working with the Trust to support the programming and operation of the schoolhouse. The museum is open for education programs by appointment and open to walk-in visitors during regular business hours.

Several films have been shot at Enoch Turner Schoolhouse, including Down the Road Again (2011).

== Architectural style ==
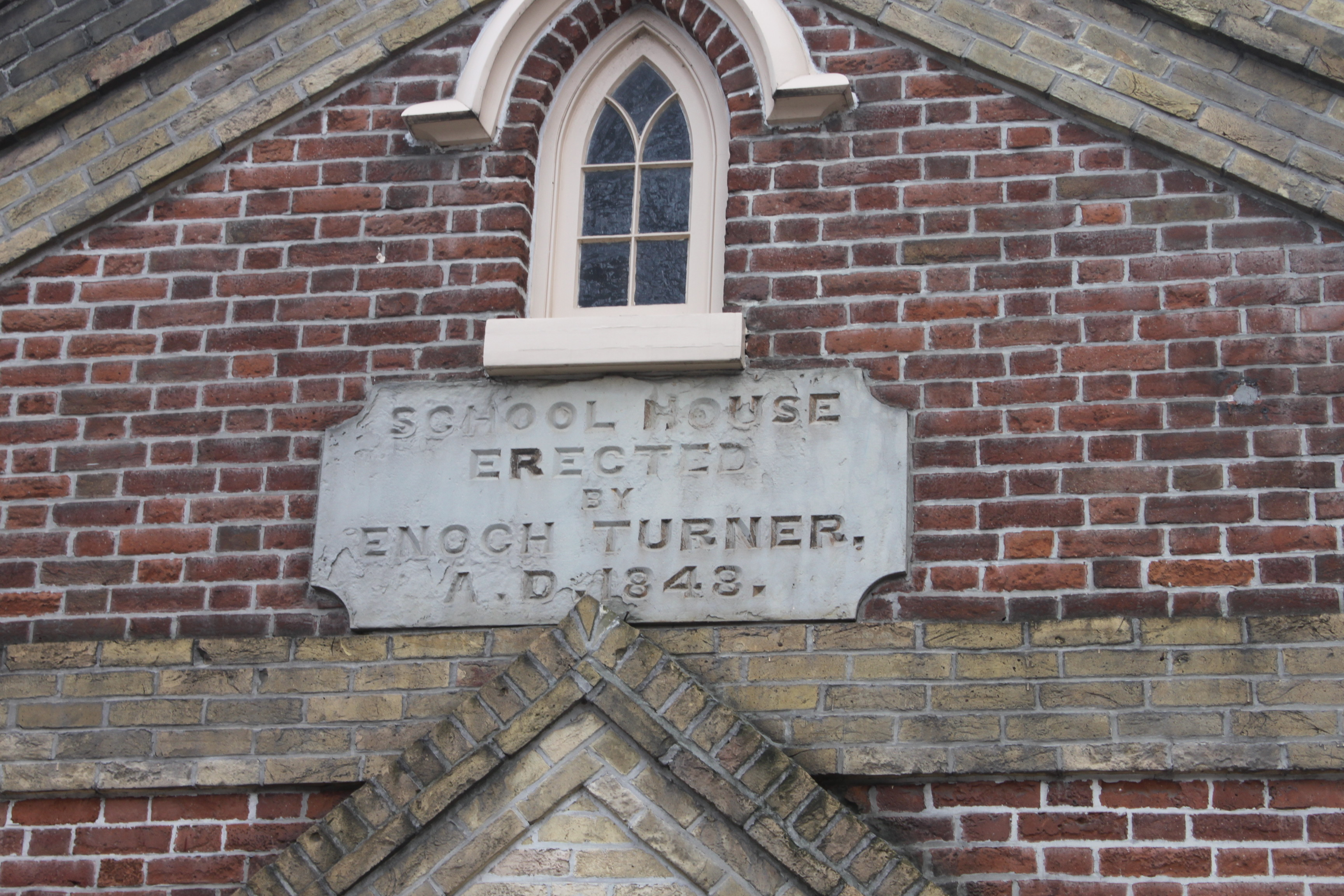
Memorial stonework above the front door

The design of the one-story Gothic Revival style brick schoolhouse is attributed to an English architect Henry Bowyer Lane, who worked in Canada from about 1841 to 1847 and who also designed the adjacent Little Trinity Church in 1845. The building has an unusual exclamation mark windows that flank the front door. In 1869, the building was expanded to the west with an addition designed by Toronto architectural firm Gundry and Langley. The addition is a particularly early work by Henry Langley, who opened his own practice that same year, following the death of Thomas Gundry. Langley went on to become one of the most influential 19th-century architects in Ontario, designing important Toronto landmarks such as the Metropolitan United Church (56 Queen Street East), McMaster Hall (273 Bloor Street West) and the Bank of British North America (49 Yonge Street). In 1910, the south addition was built.

== Affiliations ==
The museum is affiliated with: CMA, CHIN, and Virtual Museum of Canada.

== See also ==
- List of museums in Toronto
