= Trinity Square =

Trinity Square may refer to:

- Trinity Square (Gateshead), a shopping centre in Gateshead, Tyne & Wear, England
- Trinity Square (Nottingham), a shopping centre in Nottingham, England
- Trinity Square Gardens, a garden square (also known as Tower Hill) north of the Tower of London, England
- Trinity Square (Toronto), a public square in Toronto, Ontario, Canada
- Red Square, in Moscow, Russia, known as Trinity Square in the 17th century
