= Corktown =

Corktown can refer to:

- Corktown, Toronto, Ontario, Canada, a neighbourhood
- Corktown, Hamilton, Ontario, Canada, a neighbourhood
- Corktown, Detroit, Michigan, United States, a neighbourhood
- Corktown, Ottawa, Ontario, Canada, a former neighbourhood in the city's early history
