= Bonnie Briggs =

Canadian affordable housing advocate (1952/1953-2017)

Bonnie Briggs (1952/53–2017) was a Canadian affordable housing advocate and poet. She created the Toronto Homeless Memorial in 1997.

== Early life and education ==
Briggs was born in Brampton, Ontario in 1952 or 1953.

She studied community work at George Brown College, graduating in 1997.

== Adult life ==
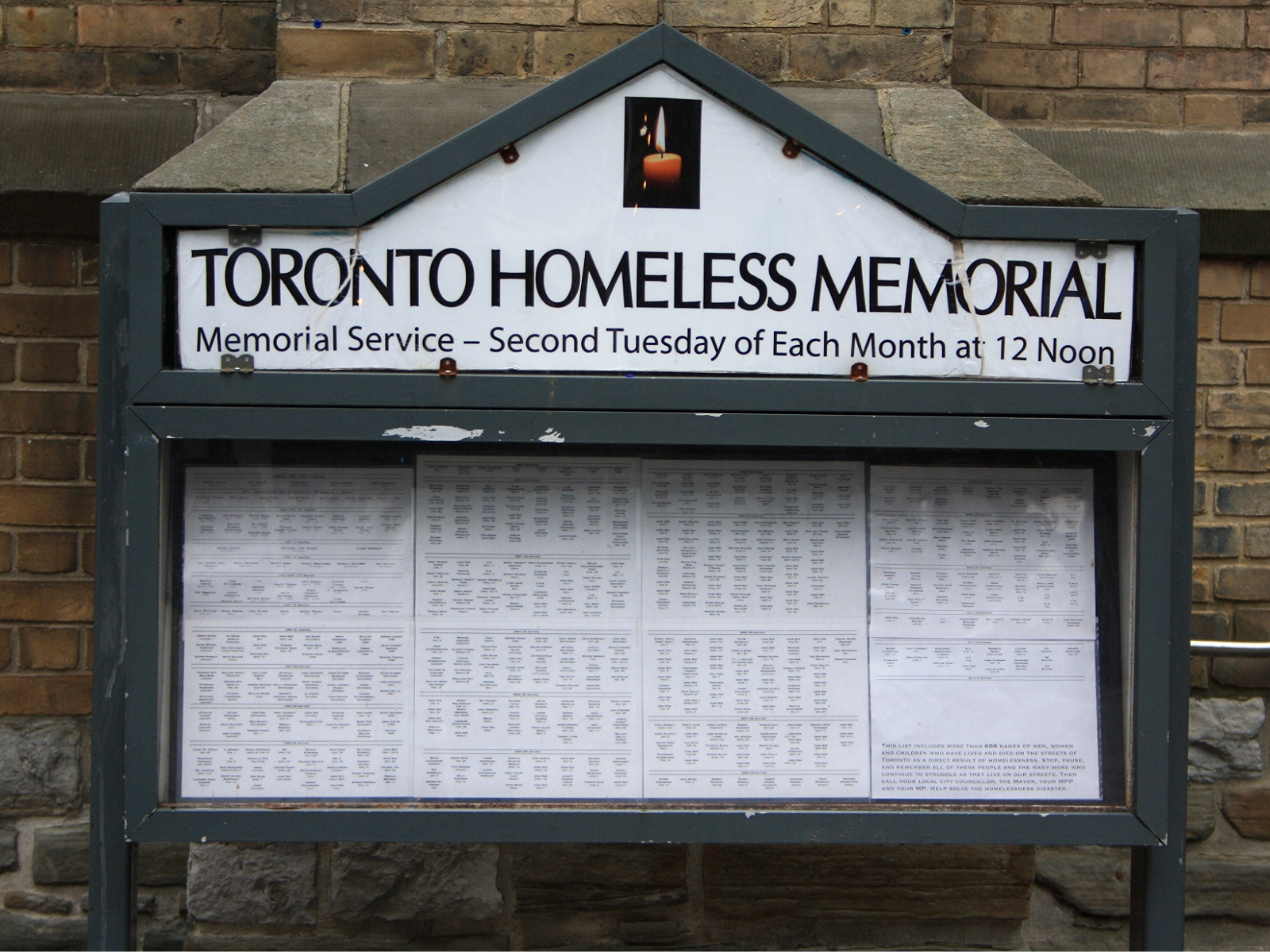
Toronto Homeless Memorial

Briggs was an author and a poet.

Briggs was made homeless twice, in 1987 and 1989. She was featured in the book Dying For a Home by Cathy Crowe. Briggs worked as an ambassador for Parkdale Activity Recreation Centre where she led their Tiny Houses Project to provide affordable housing to homeless people. As an activist for affordable housing, Briggs attended meetings, protests, and took part in activities organized by the Ontario Coalition Against Poverty, the ODSP Action Coalition, the Toronto Disaster Relief Committee, Parkdale NDP, United Tenants of Ontario, and ACORN. She created the Toronto Homeless Memorial in 1997, having started working on the project in 1996. By 2021, the memorial, located at the Church of the Holy Trinity, had over 1,200 names of people who died while experiencing homelessness in Toronto.

She was married to husband Kerry Briggs whom she met at a dance in Kleinburg in 1982. They married in 1983.

== Death ==
On August 4, 2017, Briggs died in her home in Parkdale. She was aged 64 at the time of death.
