= Toronto Homeless Memorial =

Canadian memorial

Coordinates: 43°39′17″N 79°22′54″W

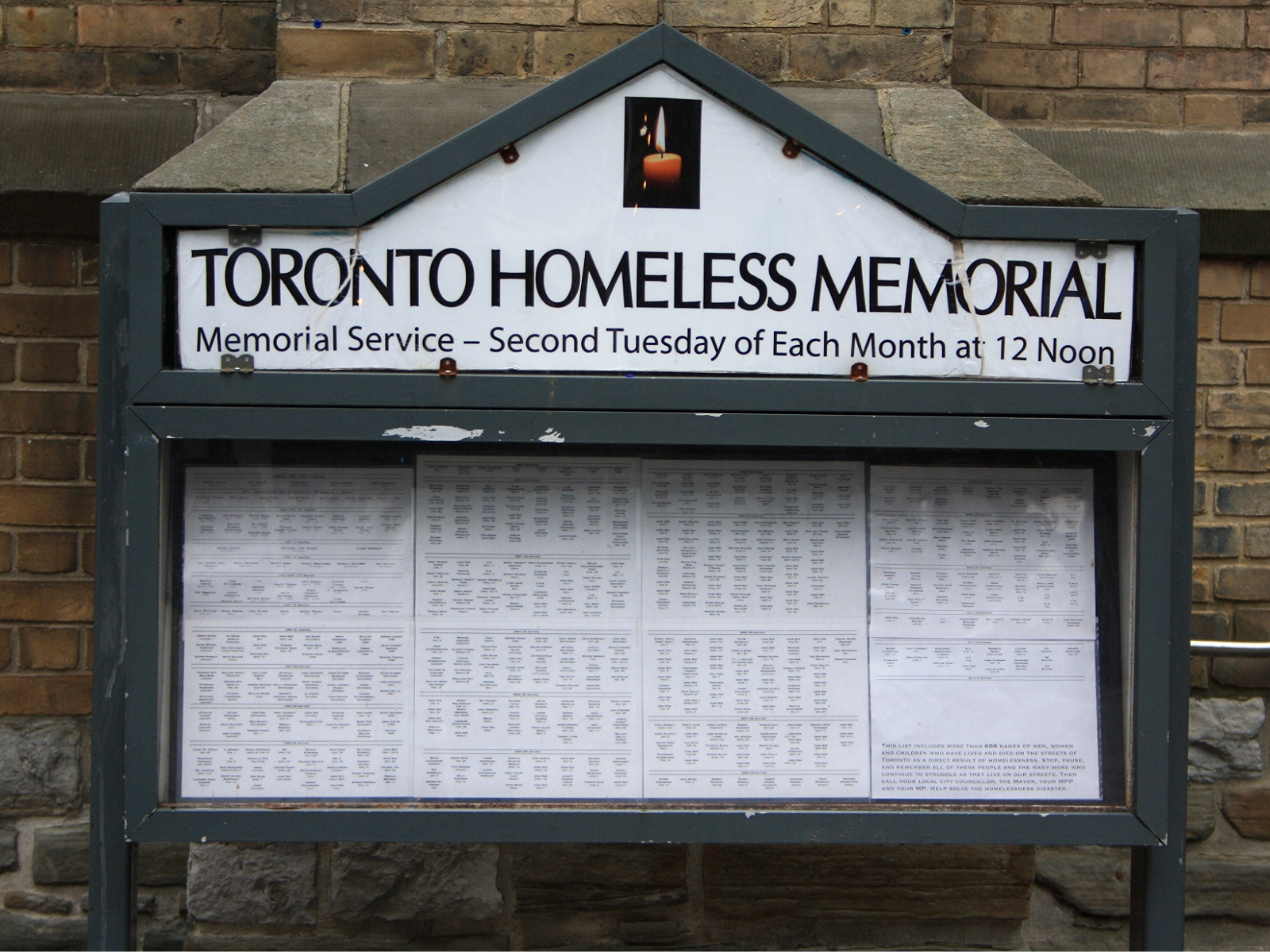
- Toronto Homeless Memorial
- Website: holytrinity.to/justice-work/homeless-memorial/

The Toronto Homeless Memorial is a memorial to people who died while living on the streets, or in homeless shelters, in Toronto, Canada. The memorial includes the names of those who died and is updated monthly.

== Memorial ==
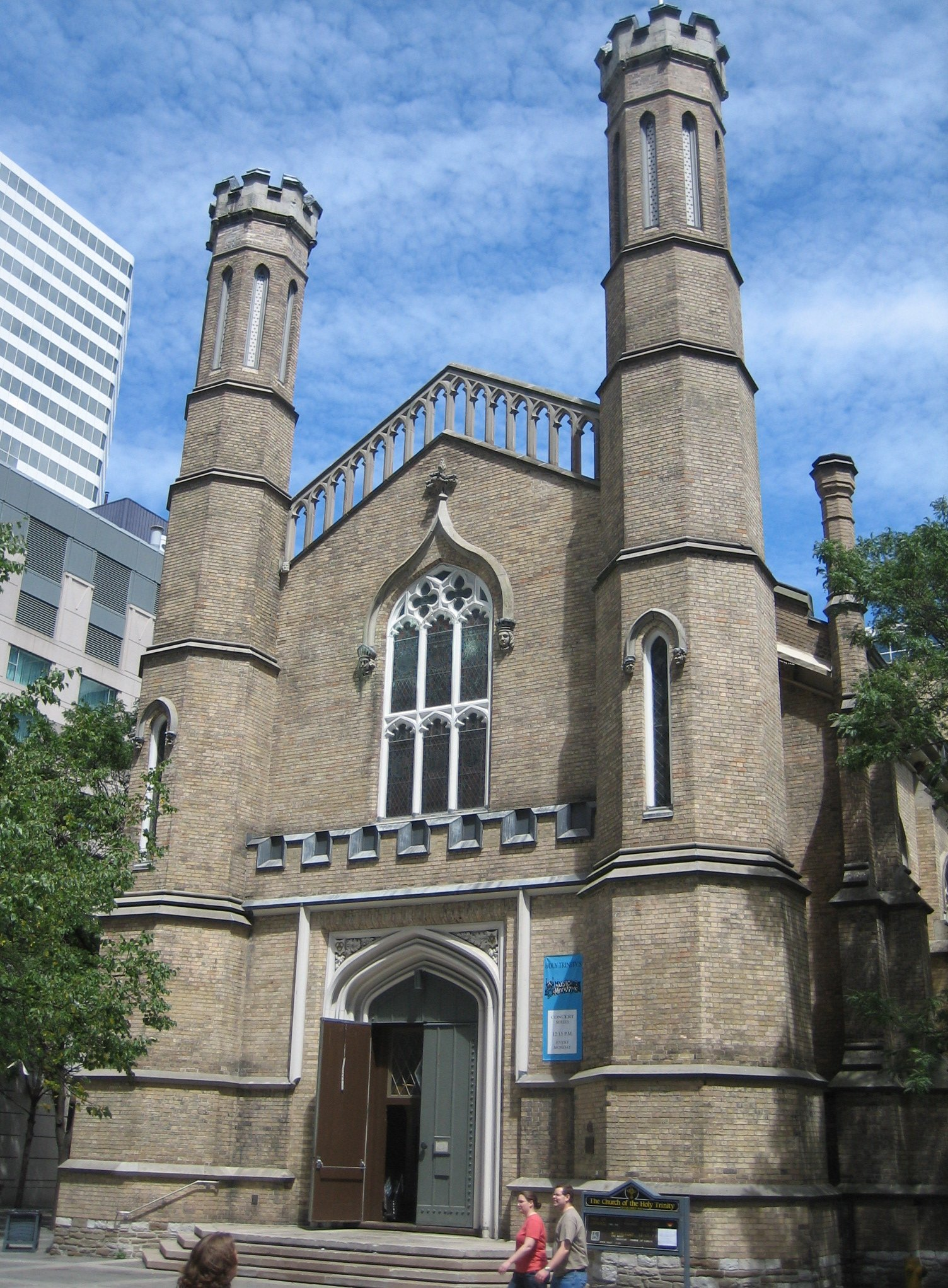
Holy Trinity Church

The memorial is located outside the Church of the Holy Trinity and it is maintained by church staff and community members. As of December 2021, it included approximately 1,200 names of people who died while living in homeless shelters or the streets of Toronto.

The names of the deceased are added on the second Tuesday of every month.

== History ==
The memorial was started in 1997 by Bonnie Briggs, a housing advocate.

The list of names on the memorial reached 1,000 in the year 2020.

In December 2021, memorial organisers added 34 names to the memorial, the highest ever added at once; names included John Doe and Jane Doe placeholders as the names of some of the deceased were unknown.

== See also ==
- Homelessness in Canada
- Affordable housing in Canada
