= Eaton's Annex =

Coordinates: 43.6537°N 79.3821°W

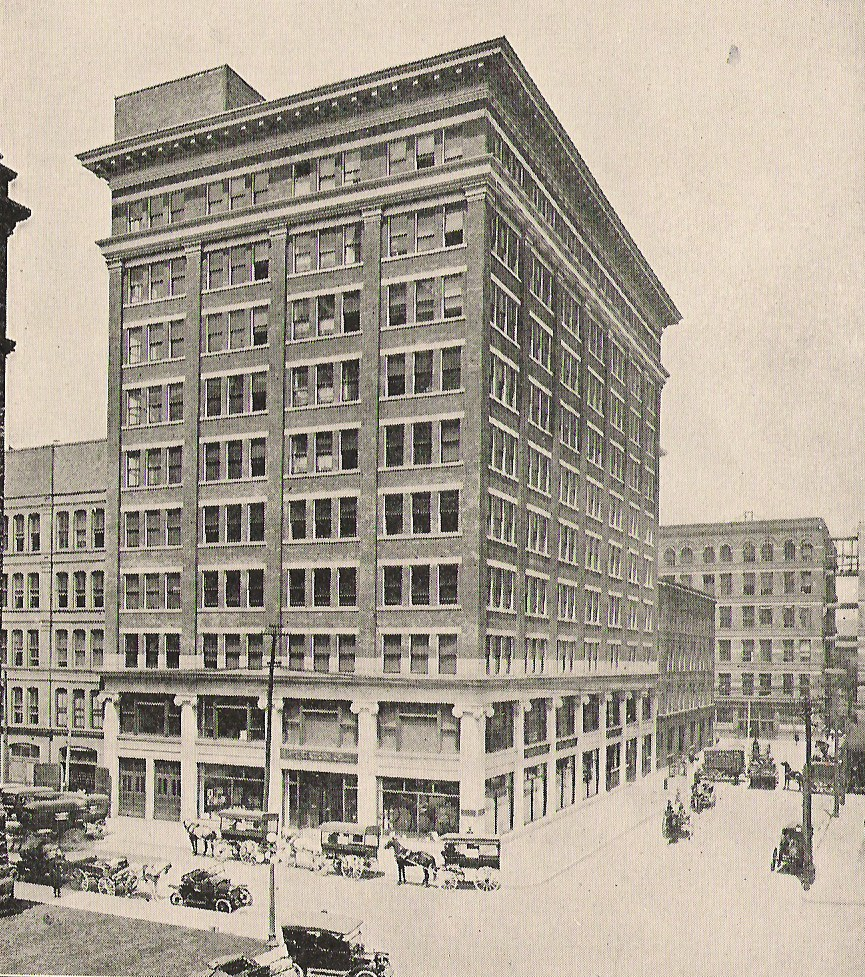
Eaton's House Furnishing Building in 1919, later known as Eaton's Annex.

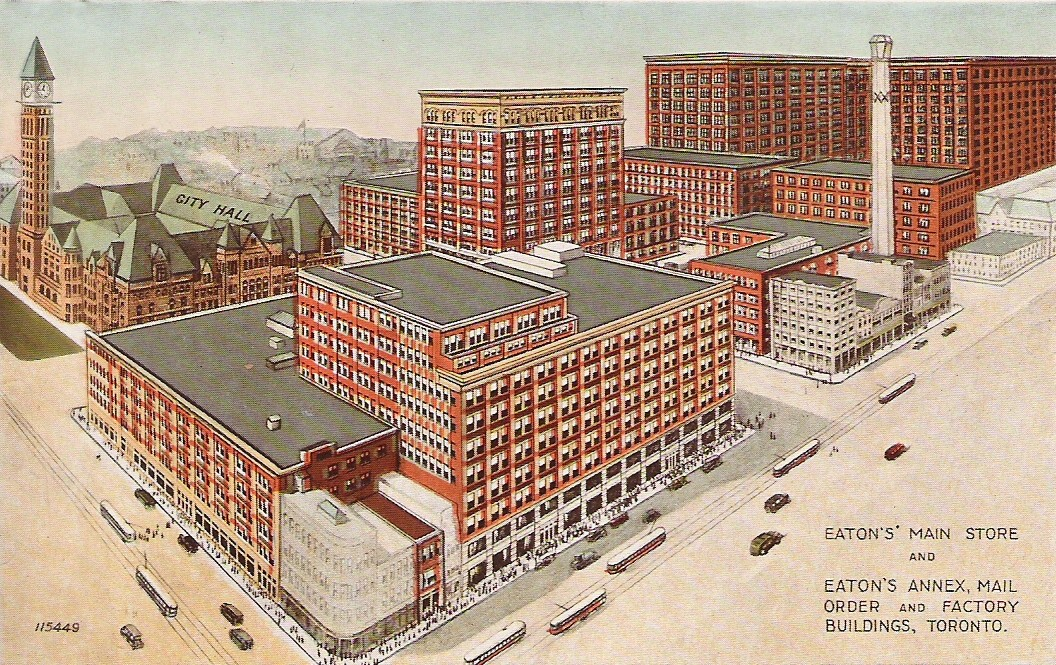
The view northwest from Yonge and Queen Streets overlooking various Eaton's buildings in the early 1920s. The Annex building can be seen in the middle behind Eaton's Main Store.

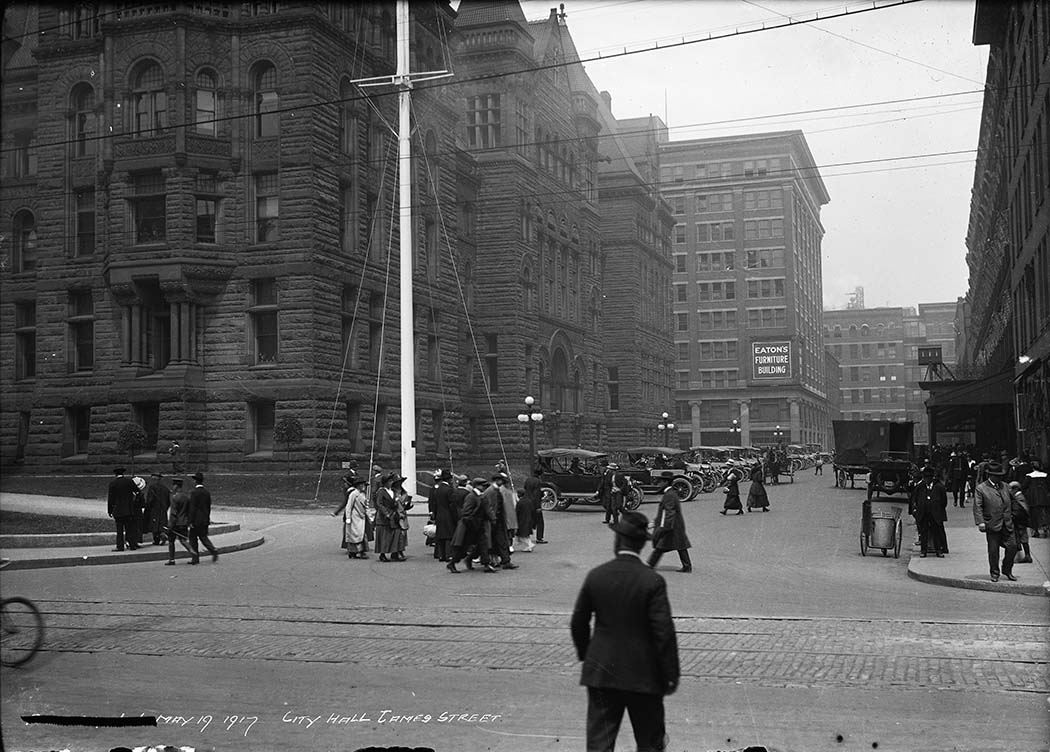
The Annex building in the background on James Street, with City Hall in the foreground, May 1917.

Eaton's Annex was a 10-storey building containing both retail and office space in Downtown Toronto, Ontario, Canada. It opened in January 1913 and was located at the northwest corner of Albert Street and James Street, west of Eaton's Main Store and north of Toronto's (now former) City Hall.

== History ==
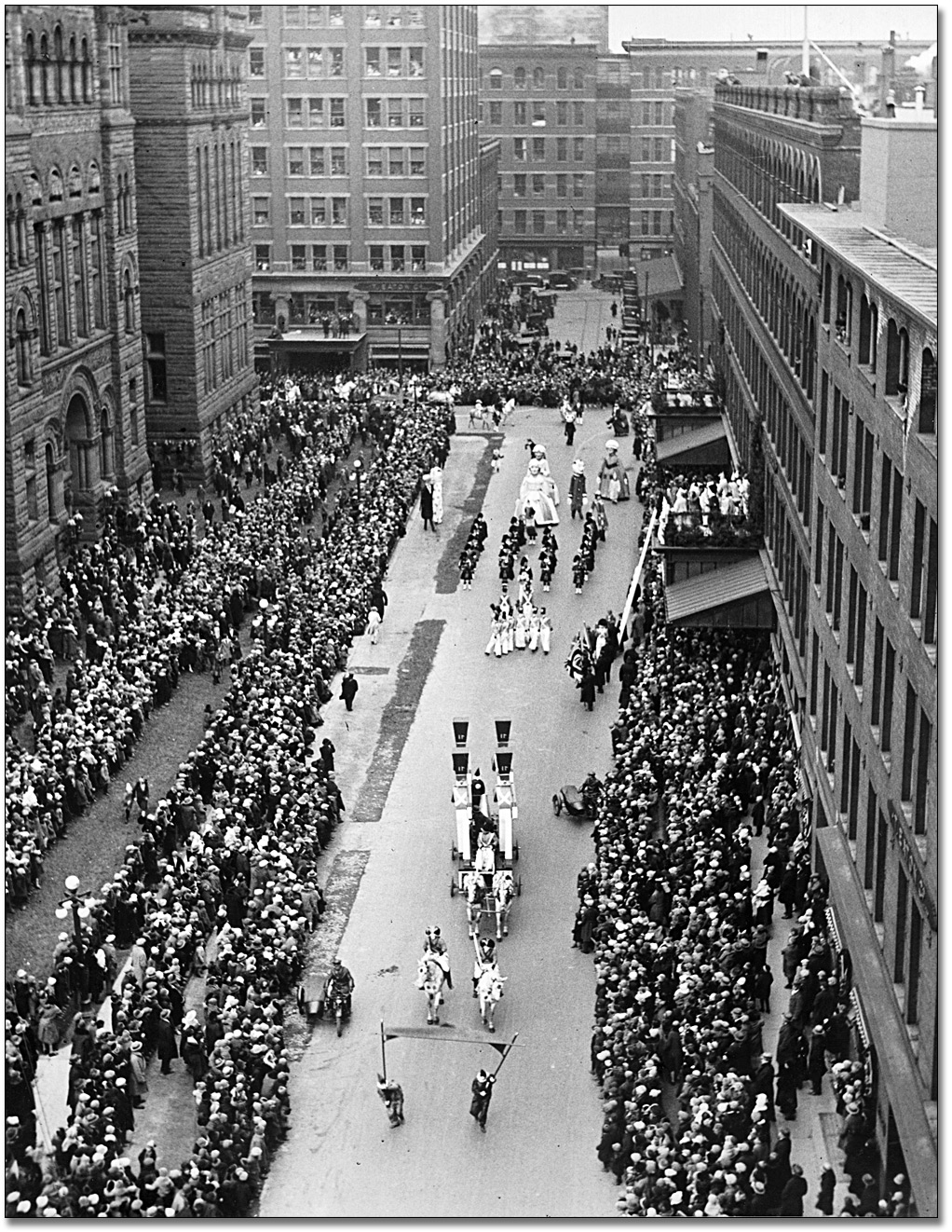
Eaton's Santa Claus Parade in 1926, with views of City Hall (left) and the Main Store (right) in the foreground, the Annex building (behind City Hall) in the middleground, and Eaton's factory buildings in the background.

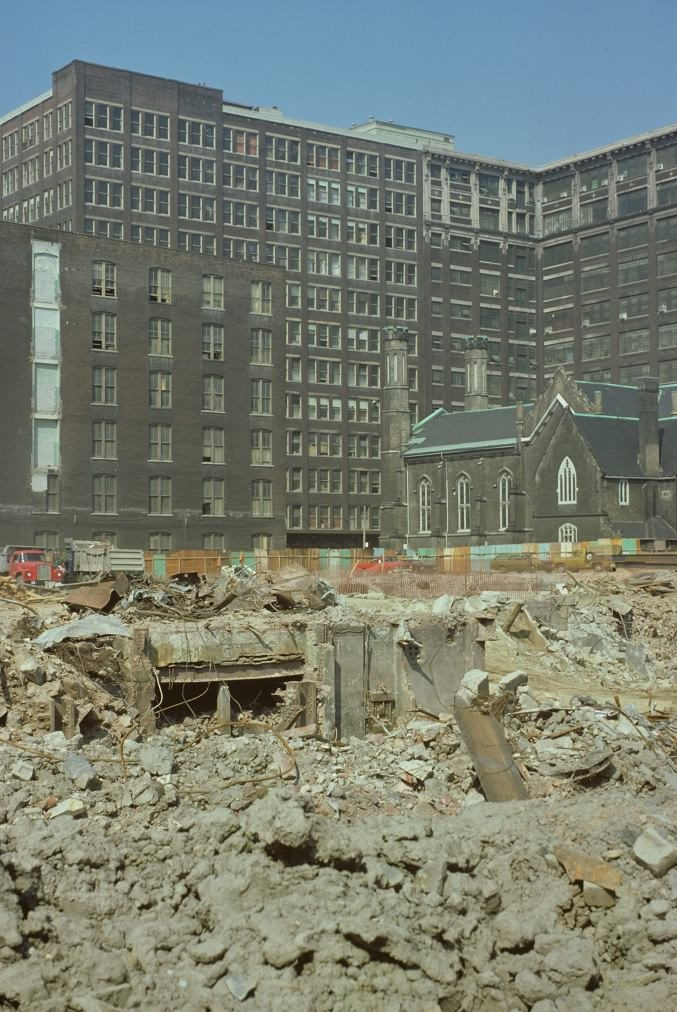
Demolition of the building after the fire, 1977. Visible in the photo are the large Eaton's warehouse and factory buildings (subsequently demolished) and Church of the Holy Trinity (still standing).

By 1900, the Eaton's department store owned most of the land within the city blocks bordered by Yonge Street, Queen Street, Bay Street and Dundas Street. The land was eventually occupied by the Eaton's Main Store, the Annex building and various Eaton's warehouses and mail-order buildings. The Main Store and the Annex, however, were the only two buildings open to the public. The two buildings were connected by an underground passageway open to both employees and shoppers. It was the first underground pathway in Toronto open to the public, and it is often credited as a historic precursor to Toronto's current downtown PATH network.

When the Annex building opened in 1913 as Eaton's House Furnishing Building, it contained Eaton's housewares and furniture departments. When these departments were moved to the new College Street store in 1930, the focus of the Annex's retail offerings was shifted to lower-cost items. While the Main Store catered to middle-class budgets, and the College Street store's offerings were more upscale, the Annex store was directed to Toronto's working classes. It offered many of the same departments and types of goods as Eaton's other two Toronto stores, but in cheaper varieties, and with less extensive in-store displays and customer service. As such, the Annex represented one of the first instances in Canada where a traditional, full-line department store operated a separate discount outlet or chain.

The Eaton's Annex and some surrounding warehouses were destroyed by fire on May 9, 1977. The fire was described as "the first of its kind in downtown Toronto since the Great Fire of 1904". Although it destroyed a number of Eaton's buildings and damaged the nearby Church of the Holy Trinity, it did not significantly affect the newly constructed first phase of the Toronto Eaton Centre.

== Legacy ==
Parts of the Annex building survive as Trinity Square. A portion of the Bell Trinity Square office complex currently occupies the former Annex site. The same underground passage that formerly linked the Annex and the Main Store now connects the Eaton Centre to the Bell Trinity Centre, and it is part of the PATH network.

In honour of this store, a ski run at the Caledon Ski Club in Caledon, Ontario, was named "Eaton's Annex" after the Eaton family, who were original members of the private club.
