= Bell Trinity Square =

Office complex in Toronto

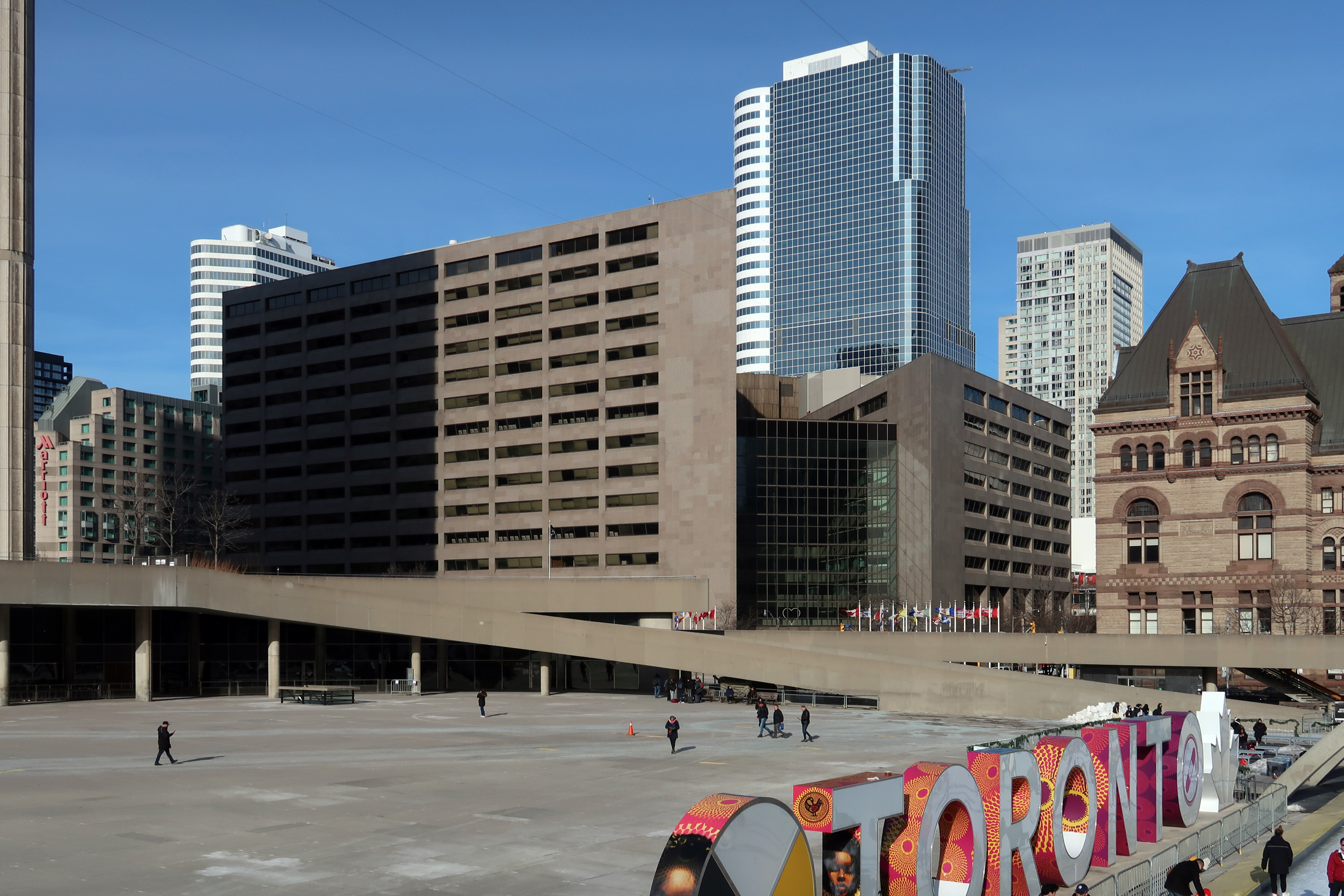
- Bell Trinity Square as viewed from nearby Nathan Phillips Square

- Location within Toronto

General information
- Status: Completed
- Architectural style: Modernism
- Location: 483 Bay Street; Toronto, Ontario; M5G 2E1
- Coordinates: 43°39′12″N 79°22′56″W
- Construction started: 1980
- Completed: 1983
- Renovated: 2010
- Owner: BTS Realty Limited Partnership

Height
- Height: 52.53 metres (172.34 ft)

Technical details
- Floor count: 15
- Floor area: 943,630 square feet (87,670 m^{2})
- Lifts/elevators: 16 Passenger, 2 Service

Design and construction
- Architect: John C. Parkin
- Architecture firm: Parkin Partnership Architects Planners

Renovating team
- Awards: LEED Gold; 2011 Canadian Building of the year TOBY Award

Other information
- Parking: 575 spaces underground

Bell Trinity Square is an office complex occupying part of the former site of the historic Eaton's Annex in downtown Toronto, Ontario, Canada. The name is a combination of: the name of original and now former occupant Bell Canada; the location of the site south of the Church of the Holy Trinity; and Trinity Square.

Built in from 1980 to 1983 and designed by architect John C. Parkin, the post modern complex consists of 15 floor and 10 floor towers connected by a glass atrium. The building is connected to the Toronto PATH underground pedestrian network.

After renovations completed in 2010 which brought the building up to LEED Gold standards, the first retrofitted building in Toronto to achieve the standard, the site has been partially used by CIBC.

== Gallery ==
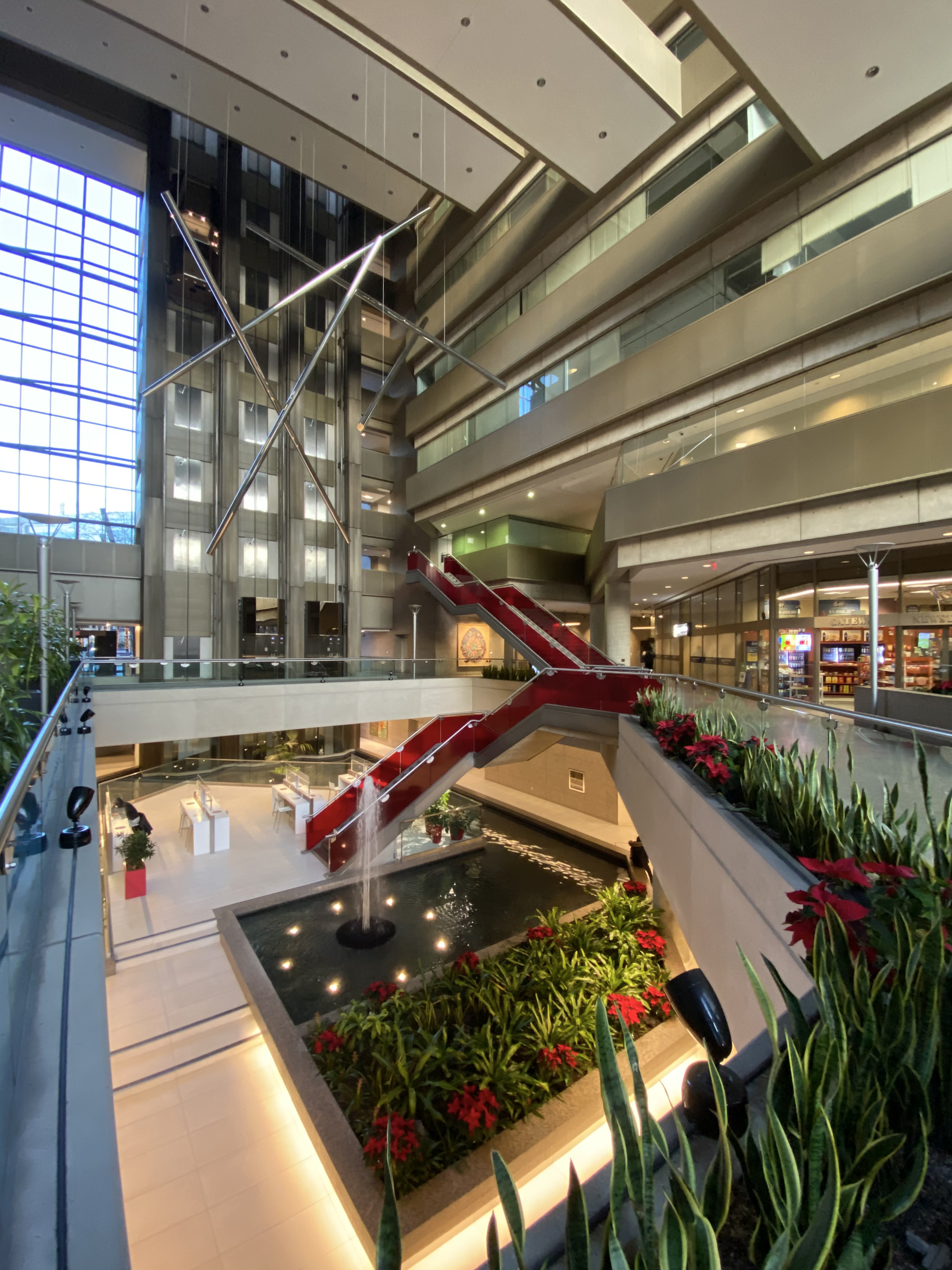
Atrium

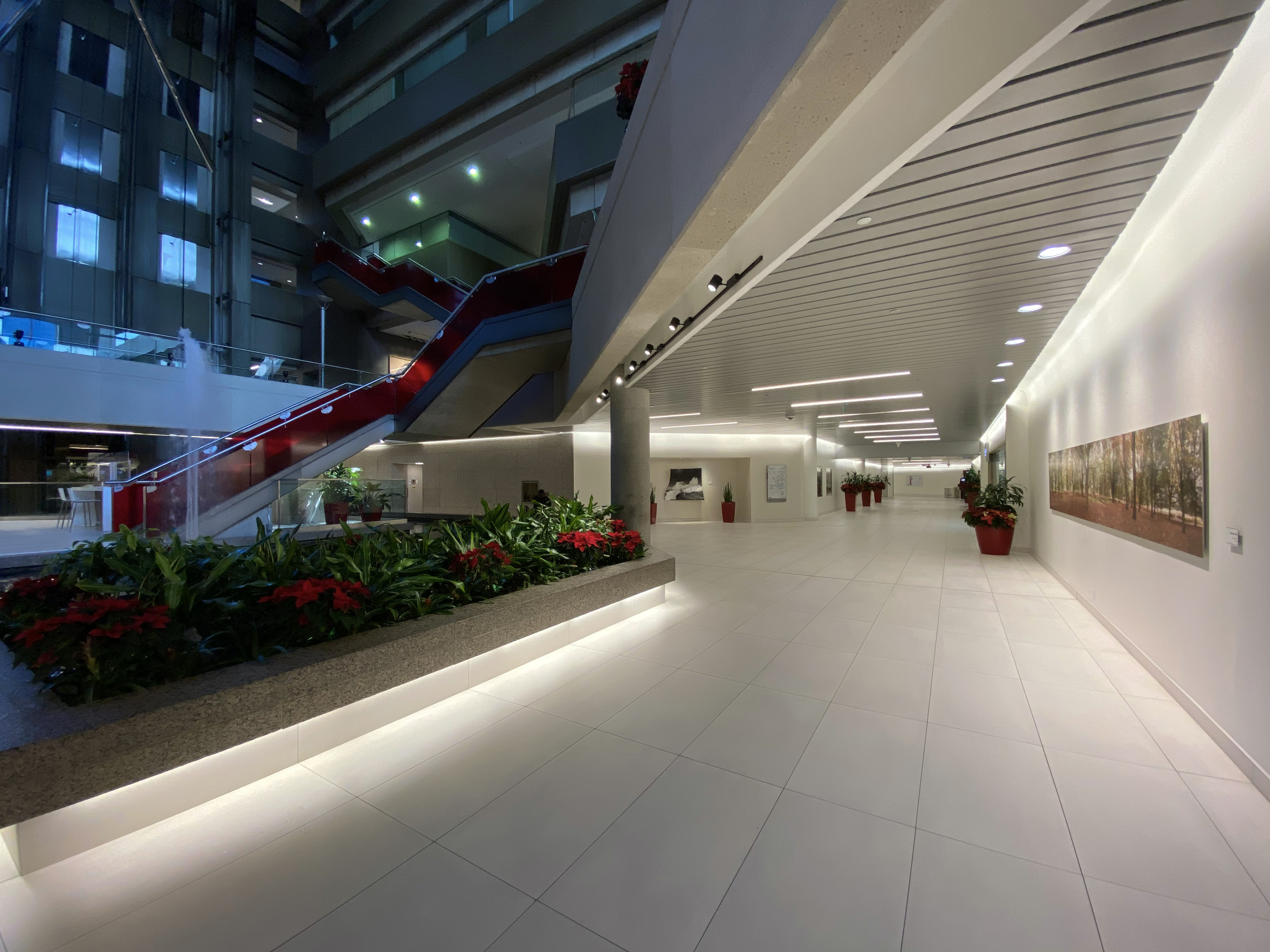
Basement PATH

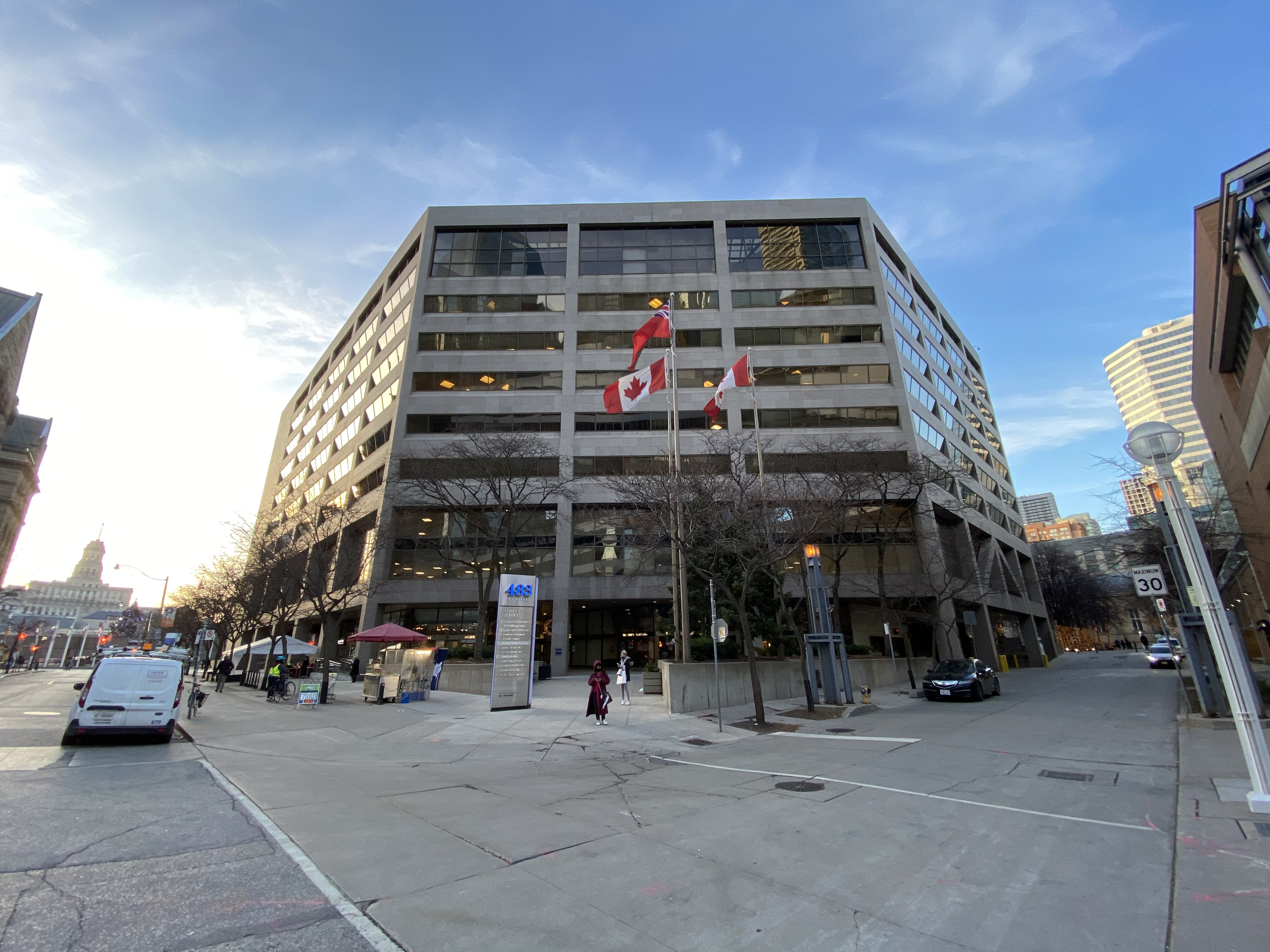
Exterior of the building
