= Church of the Holy Trinity (Toronto) =

Church in Toronto, Ontario, Canada

Coordinates: 43°39′17″N 79°22′54″W

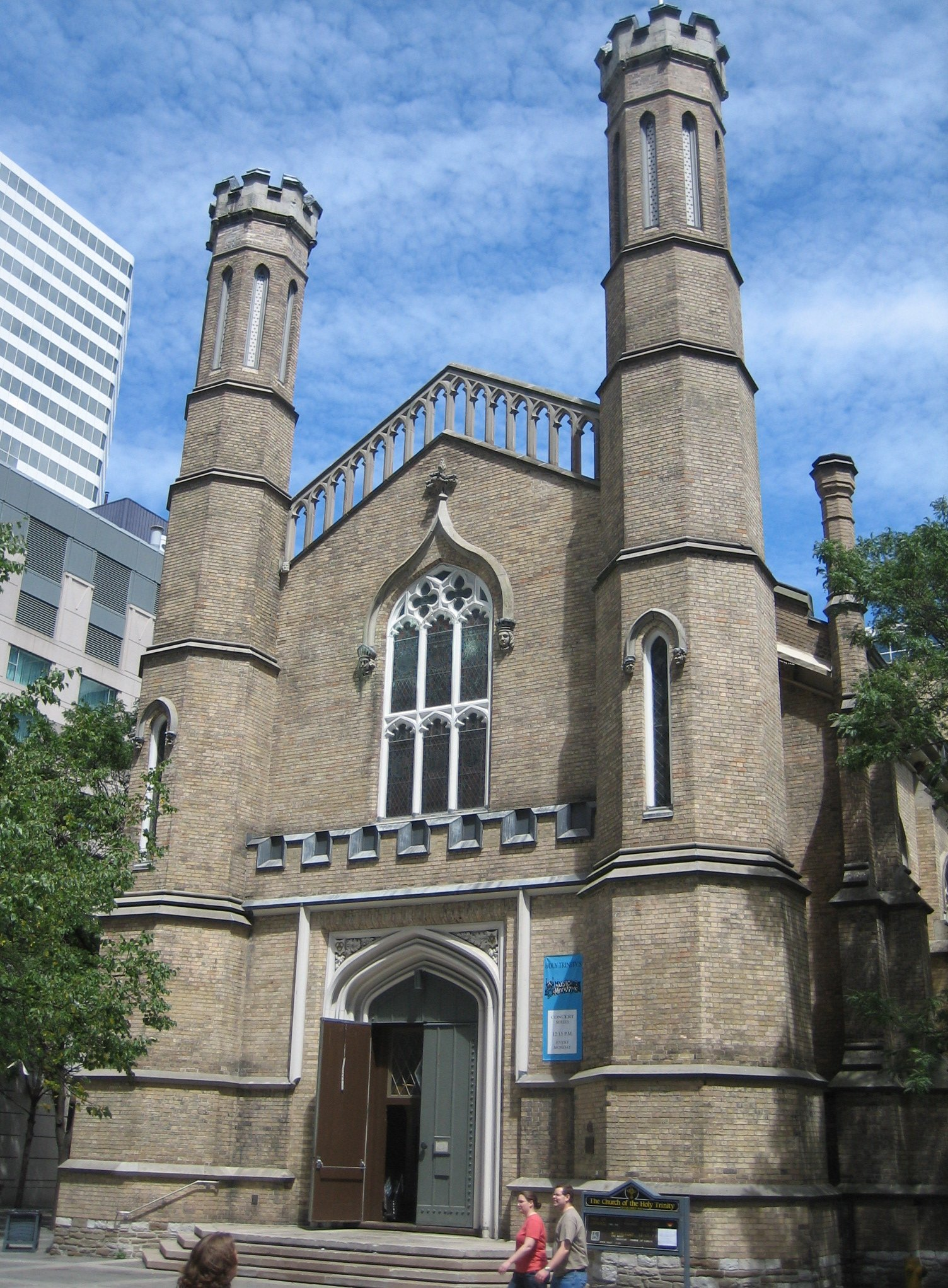
- Church of the Holy Trinity
- Denomination: Anglican Church of Canada
- Churchmanship: Broad church
- Website: holytrinity.to

History
- Dedication: Holy Trinity
- Consecrated: October 27, 1847

Administration
- Province: Ontario
- Diocese: Toronto
- Deanery: St James

Clergy
- Priest: Pamela Trondson

The Church of the Holy Trinity is an Anglican church located at Trinity Square in Toronto, Ontario, Canada.

== History ==
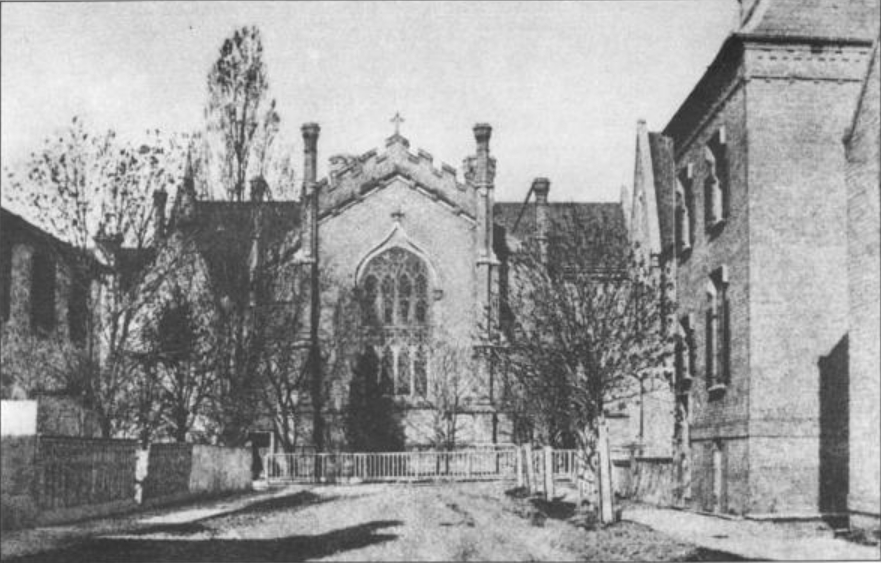
Holy Trinity Church, c. 1870

The modest Gothic Revival structure was built in 1847 by architect Henry Bowyer Lane, who also designed Little Trinity Anglican Church at 425 King Street East, and St. George the Martyr Church at 197 John Street (only the clock tower remains). The funds for its construction were a gift from Mary Lambert Swale of Settle, England. Swale had originally made the donation anonymously, but her name was eventually revealed. She had provided the gift with the stipulation that the church be open to the public, with no reserved pews. Other Torontonians assisted with the completion of this public project including Alexander Dixon who assisted with the project both financially and politically.

The lands for the church were given by the Honourable John Simcoe Macaulay in 1845. Macaulay's cottage, 'Teraulay' was then situated on an estate named Macaulay's Fields which extended from present day Yonge to Bay (then known as Teraulay) Streets, and from today's Albert Street (then known as Jeremy Street) to just south of Dundas Street. Building lots filled in the edges of the property to the north, south, and west of the Trinity site, and the central portion of the property was donated for the construction of the church. Eventually the east side of the Trinity site was sold to permit retail frontage on Yonge Street, enclosing Trinity Church, although a roadway connected Trinity to Yonge Street. The building was dedicated on October 27, 1847.

Holy Trinity was the fourth Anglican church in Toronto, after St. James' Cathedral, Little Trinity, and St. George the Martyr Church. The church's first rector was Henry Scadding. During Scadding's incumbency, the church adopted many of the practices of the Oxford Movement, including choristers dressed in surplices, altar candles, and Gregorian chant.

== Architecture ==
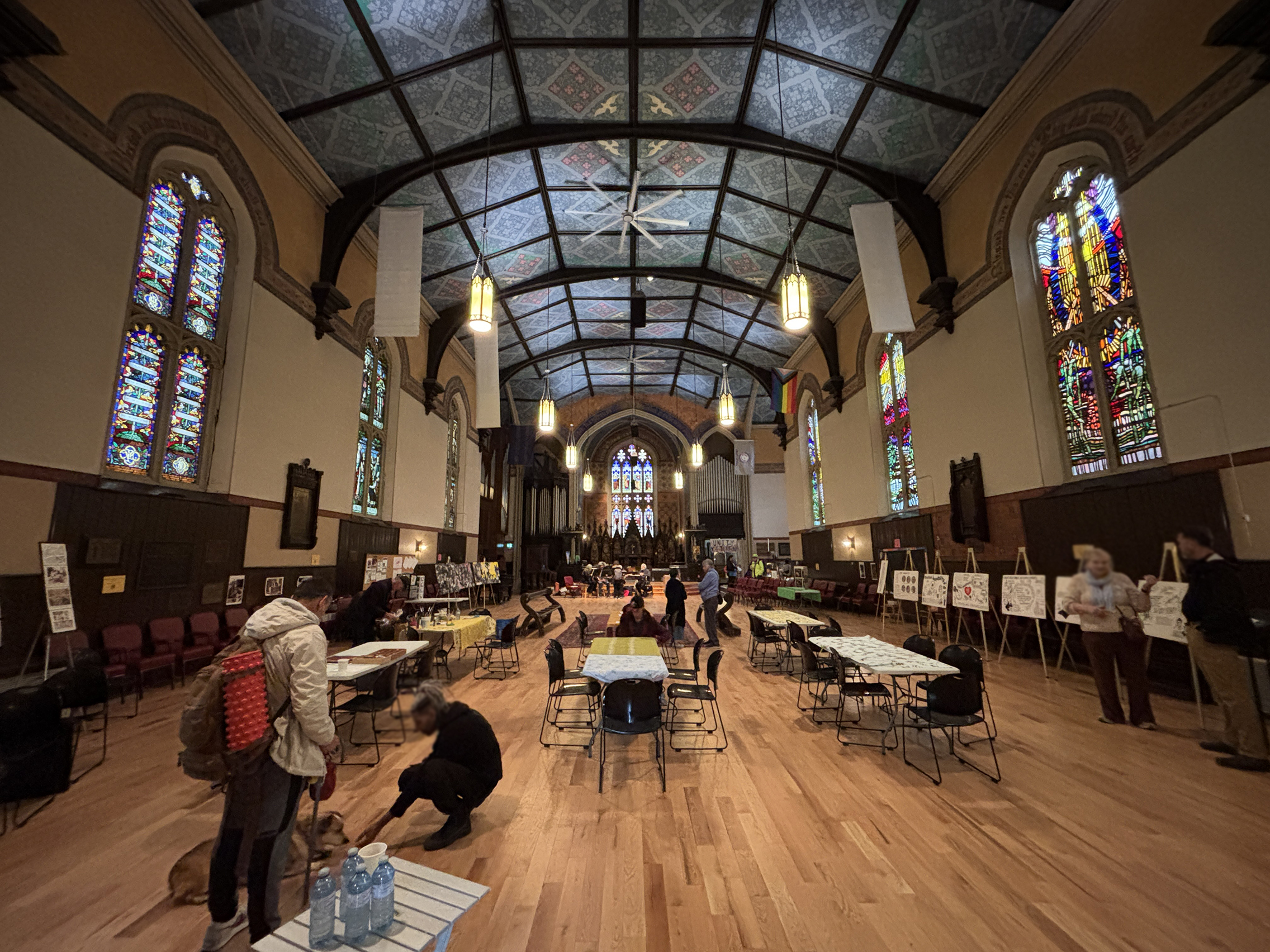
Interior of the church

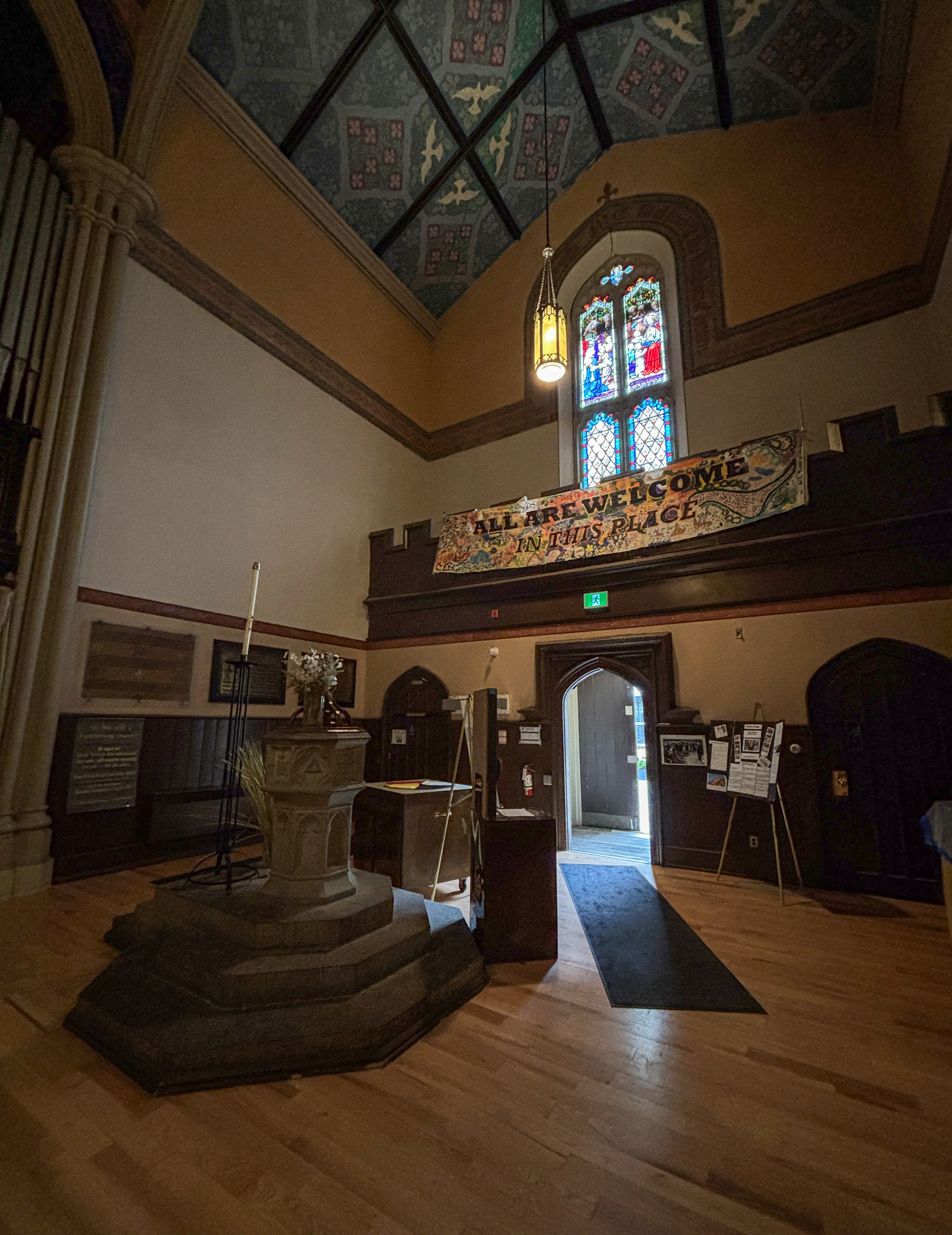
Baptismal font in the entrance

Designed by Henry Bowyer Lane, the Church of the Holy Trinity is approximately five storeys tall. Though the scale of the church is modest, its height is emphasized through details which point upward. In relation to human scale, the church feels big, tall, and strong. Even though it is surrounded by modern buildings, its role as a terminating vista has been preserved for the pedestrian lane from Bay Street to Trinity Square and also for Hagerman Street. It is visible from Toronto City Hall's podium green roof.

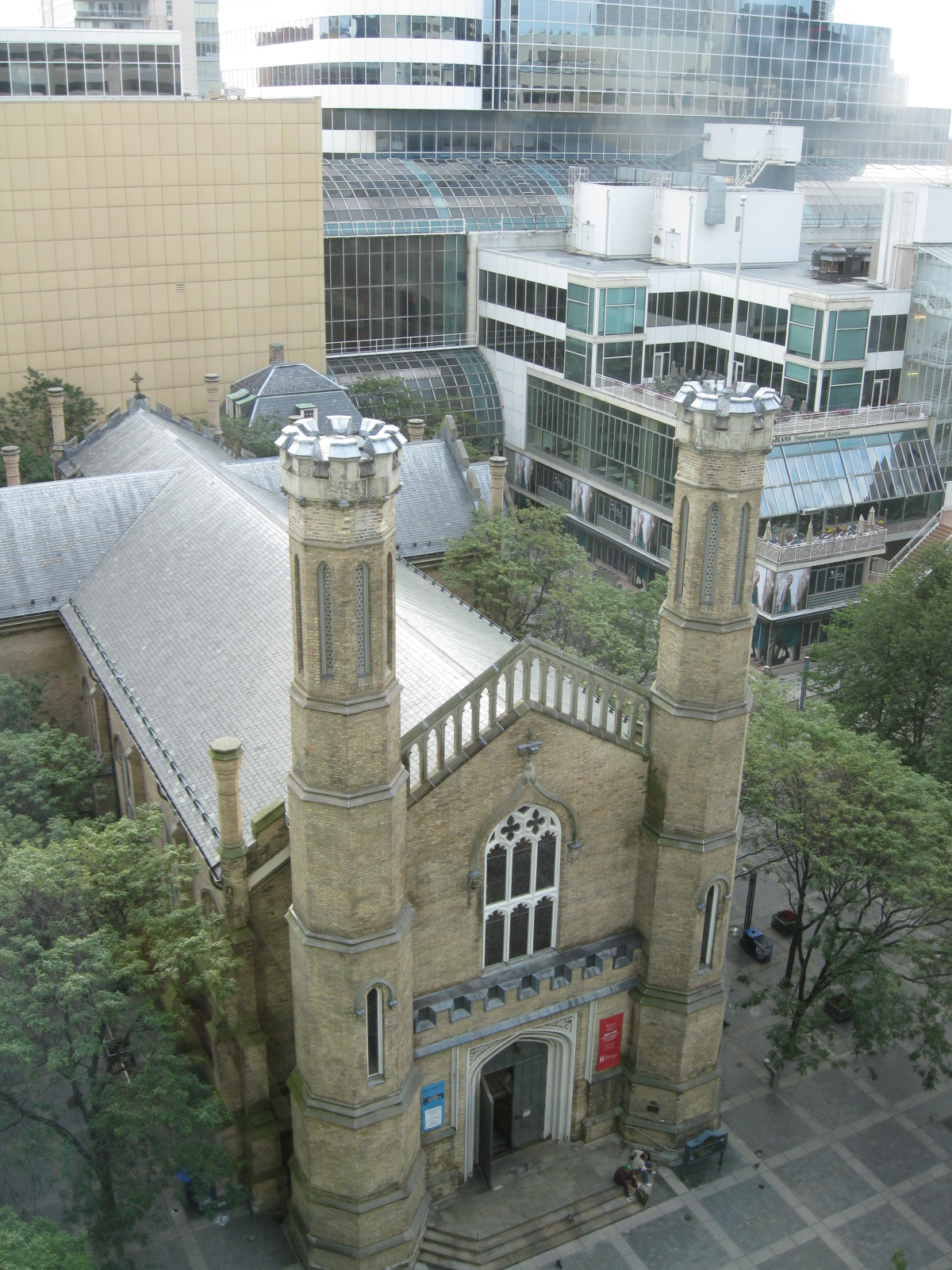
The church adheres to the Gothic church architecture characteristics with a cruciform plan.

The church's Gothic Revival design is evident in the materials and elements of the building. This style emphasizes verticality and light, which is achieved through the use of tall stained glass windows and twin turrets outlining the main entrance of the church. Like many Gothic churches, the Church of the Holy Trinity uses limestone for its foundation and window tracery, as well as sandstone, brick, and wood. This church follows the Gothic church characteristic of a cruciform in plan. The pointed arch is repeated throughout the whole building, present in the doors, windows, and Gothic vault. The stained glass windows are translucent and allow daylight into the church, each with its own unique design. Together, the variety of window designs speaks about the Bible and the history of the building. A unique element on the exterior of the church is the line of colourful shields under the eaves.

Mary Lambert Swale died at the age of 25 and gave the Toronto diocese a gift of 5,000 sterling to build a church. She requested that the church in the Gothic style, that the name be Holy Trinity, that the reading desk and pulpit not be placed as to obstruct the view of patrons, and that the pews were to be free for everyone forever. Along with the original gift she also gave a font that can still be found in the church today. The Gothic style chosen for the Church of the Holy Trinity was the late medieval Tudor style. The four pointed arch (also known as the Tudor Arch) in combination with the tall and narrow oriel windows are of Tudor style. The decorative chimney caps on most of the eleven chimneys are also in the style of Tudor architecture. The two towers flanking the west entrance of the church became a landmark of Toronto in the mid-nineteenth century and could be seen throughout the city.

There are emblems, symbols, and initials on crests under the eaves of the entire exterior, a unique feature of the church. These crests bear the initials of early rectors, the architect, and the builder. The symbols include an open book, King Soloman's head, and several other masonic symbols. A brochure can be picked up at the entrance to the church showing and explaining the crests.

The stained glass windows encompass a range of eras and styles from mid nineteenth-century stenciled glass to late twentieth-century cut glass.

== Community involvement ==
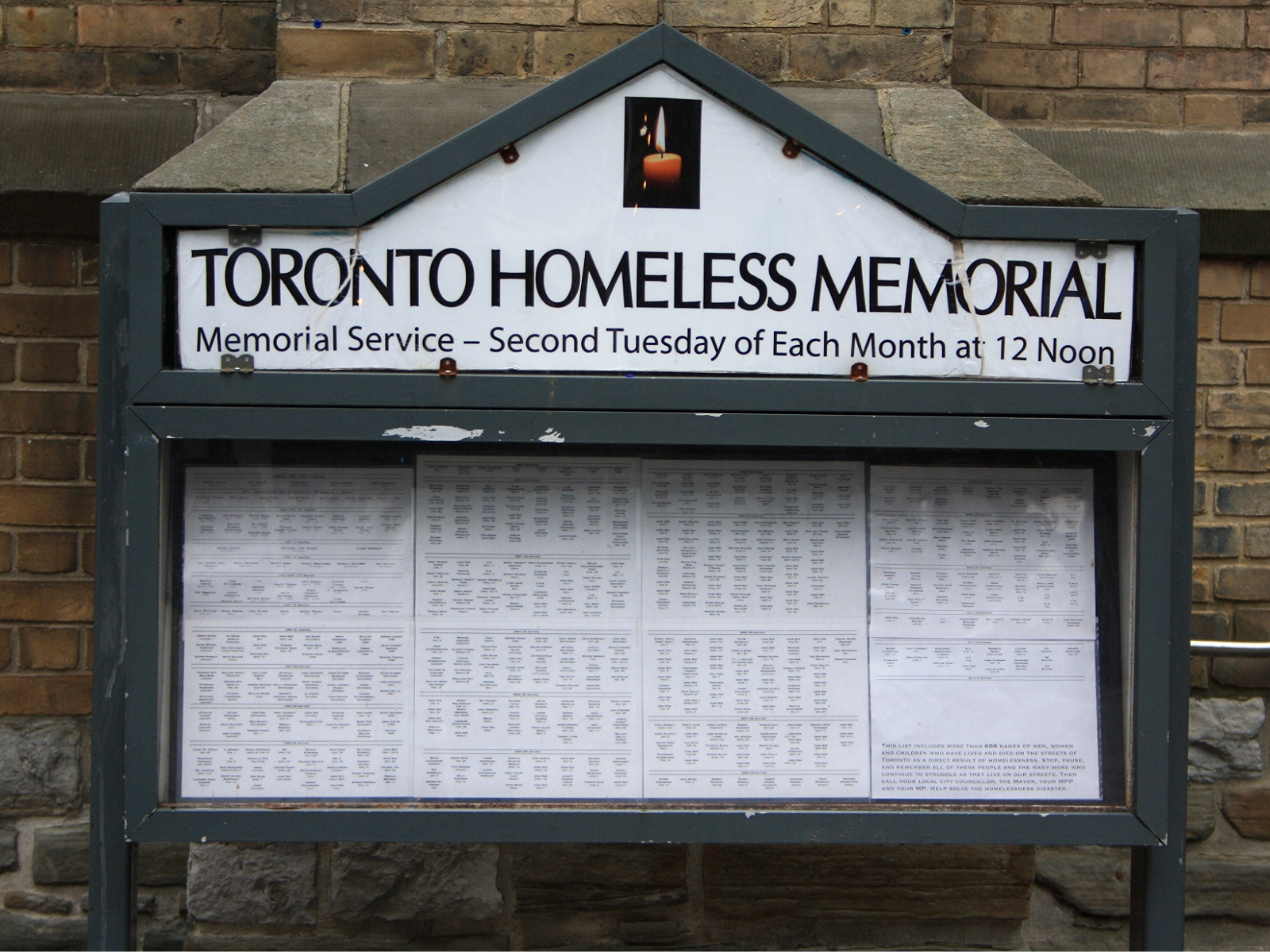
The Toronto Homeless Memorial

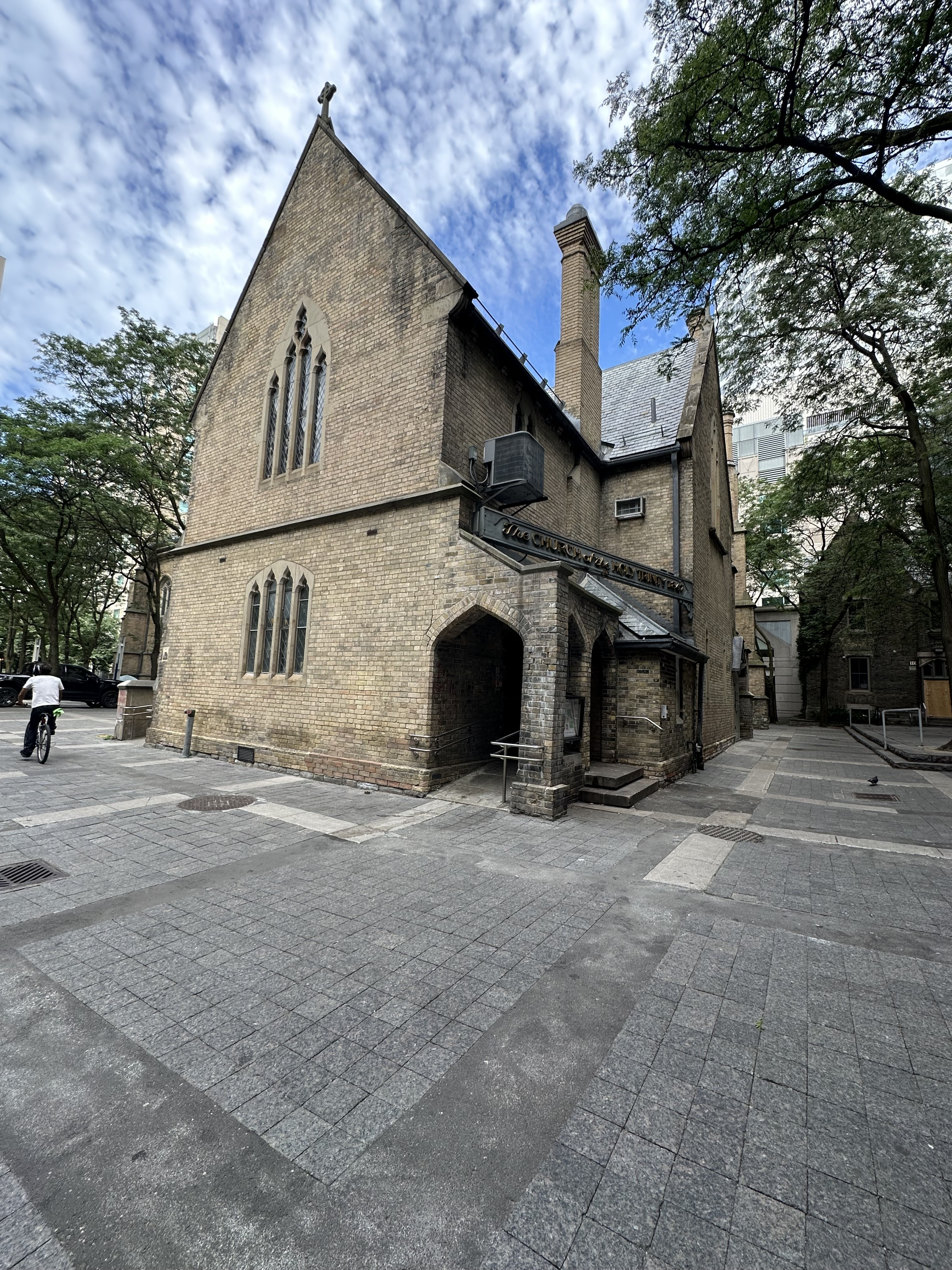
Back side of the Church of the Holy Trinity in Toronto, Canada in July 2024

Located at 19 Trinity Square with offices and program space at 6 and 10 Trinity Square, the Church of the Holy Trinity is surrounded by the Toronto Eaton Centre on the north, south, and east sides, a Marriott hotel and the Ted Rogers School of Management to the northwest, and the office building known as Bell Trinity Square to the southeast. The original Eaton Centre construction plans called for the church to be demolished as well, but the parishioners successfully resisted and forced the mall's design to be changed.

Since its construction, the city of Toronto has expanded so that the church now finds itself in the middle of Toronto's urban core. As a result, the church has tailored its ministry to the urban homeless and needy, and maintains the Toronto Homeless Memorial outside the church doors which lists the names of homeless people who have died on the streets of Toronto.

The church also has an active outreach to Toronto's LGBT community. Prior to acquiring its first building in 1985, the Metropolitan Community Church of Toronto worshipped there, and the church vocally supported Anglican priest James Ferry after he was inhibited by the Anglican Church in 1991 when his sexual relationship with another man was discovered.

Holy Trinity has also become an important venue for artistic events. The church participates as a venue in Toronto's annual Nuit Blanche, and presents a weekly series of classical, choral, and jazz concerts throughout the year, as well as a dramatization of the Christmas story every December since 1937.

Due to the church's excellent acoustics, Canadian band Cowboy Junkies recorded their 1988 breakthrough album The Trinity Session at the church on November 27, 1987. In 2006, they returned to record a 20th anniversary edition of the album, Trinity Revisited. The recording engineer for the original album, Peter J. Moore, died November 11, 2023, and his Celebration of Life ceremony was held in the church on November 25th, almost 36 years to the day after the original recording. For the Juno Awards of 2021, which was broadcast from a variety of locations due to the COVID-19 pandemic in Canada, singers William Prince and Serena Ryder performed Prince's single "The Spark" in the church.

== Notable people ==
- T. J. Crawford, organist at Church of the Holy Trinity in 1932.

== See also ==
- Dan Heap
- Eaton's Annex
- List of Anglican churches in Toronto
- List of oldest buildings and structures in Toronto
