= John Simcoe Macaulay =

Businessman and political figure in Upper Canada

Colonel The Hon. John Simcoe Macaulay (13 October 1791 – 20 December 1855) was a businessman and political figure in Upper Canada. In 1845, before retiring to England, he donated the land on which the Church of the Holy Trinity (Toronto) was built.

== Early life ==
He was born in England in 1791, the son of James Macaulay and Elizabeth Tuck Hayter. His parents came to Upper Canada in 1792, enjoying the patronage of Lieutenant-Governor Sir John Graves Simcoe, who was also his godfather and for whom he was named. Macaulay grew up in York and attended John Strachan's school in Cornwall. In 1805, he went to England to study at the Royal Military Academy in Woolwich. He became a captain in the Royal Engineers and served with them during the Peninsular War, seeing action at the Battle of Barrosa. He remained with his regiment until 1827, when he was appointed Professor of Fortification at the Royal Military College, Sandhurst.

== Toronto ==
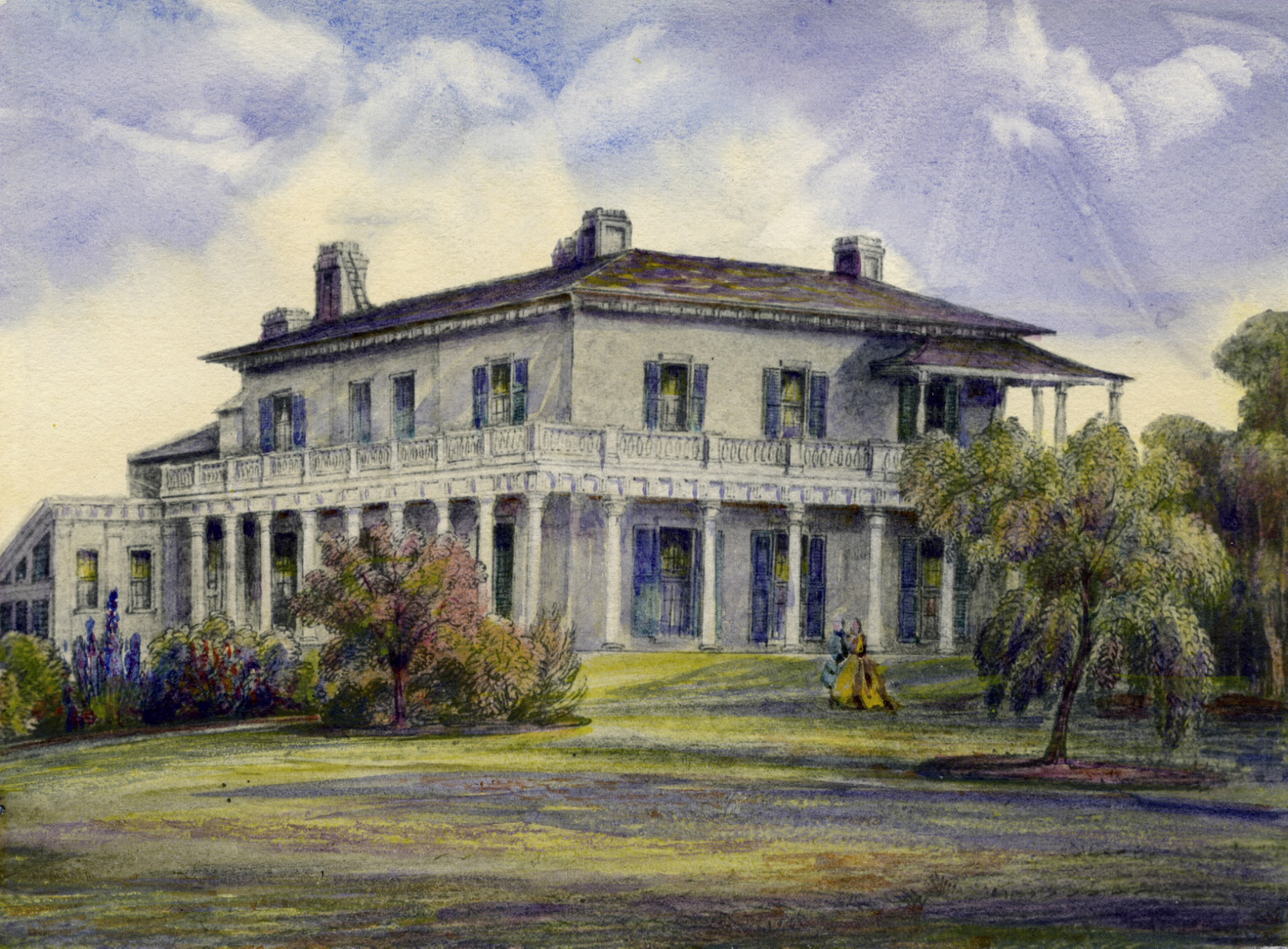
Macaulay's home, Elmsley Villa, c.1840; afterwards the Governor's residence

When he resigned in 1835, he returned to York, Upper Canada, which had been renamed Toronto the previous year, to manage his inheritance. He made his home at Elmsley House, which had belonged (though he never lived there) to his father-in-law, and was afterwards lived in by James Bruce, 8th Earl of Elgin. Macauley became a director of the Bank of Upper Canada. In 1836, he was appointed Surveyor-General for Upper Canada by the new Lieutenant-Governor, Sir Francis Bond Head. The appointment was disputed because the candidate favoured by the Family Compact had been ignored and others did not consider Macaulay a genuine resident of the province. Head advised Macaulay to submit his resignation to the Colonial Secretary, expecting it to be refused, but it was accepted and John Macaulay, no relation, was appointed to the post instead. In 1839, he was elected to the Legislative Council of Upper Canada. Two years later, he was elected to the Toronto city council but, again frustrated by the Family Compact, he resigned after Henry Sherwood was elected mayor instead of him.

== Family ==
In 1825, at Croydon in Surrey, he had married Anne Gee Elmsley, the eldest daughter of The Hon. John Elmsley, Chief Justice of Upper Canada, by his wife Mary, daughter of Captain Benjamin Hallowell (1723–1799) R.N., of Roxbury; the Commissioner of Customs for the Port of Boston at the time of the Boston Tea Party. Mrs Macaulay's mother was from a distinguished Boston family, but as a Loyalist her grandfather had lost his estates at both Roxbury and Maine, as well as all his possessions, and was sentenced to death if he ever set foot in Boston again. On that side, Mrs Macaulay was a niece of Admiral Sir Benjamin Hallowell-Carew, of Beddington Park, Surrey, and his brother Ward Hallowell (who was later known as Ward Nicholas Boylston), a great benefactor of Harvard University; they were two of the nephews of Governor Moses Gill. Mrs Macaulay's maternal grandmother, Mary (Boylston) Hallowell, was a first cousin of Susanna Boylston, the mother of the 2nd President of the United States, John Adams, and grandmother of the 6th President, John Quincy Adams.

== Retirement ==
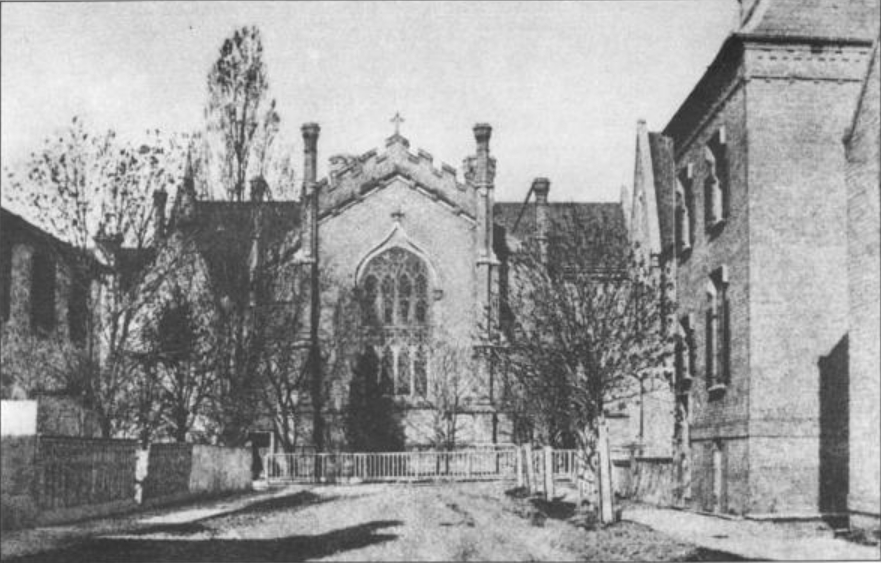
Holy Trinity Church, c.1870. Built on land donated by John Simcoe Macaulay in 1845

In 1845, disgruntled by political life in Toronto, Macaulay sold his property there for a profit of £21,000. He donated part of the gardens (known as Macaulay's Fields) of the home in which he had grown up in to the Anglican Church, where in 1847 the Church of the Holy Trinity, was built. Macaulay moved with his family to England. They took up residence at Rede Court, near Rochester, not far from Macaulay's first cousin, General George William Powlett Bingham C.B., J.P., of The Vines, Rochester. He did travel back to North America in 1852, on the SS Great Britain, however he died in Rochester in 1855, and his wife survived him until 1862. They were the parents of eight surviving children. None of their daughters married, and they all lived together in Torquay. One son lived in England, another in Toronto, another in South Africa and another in New Zealand.
