= Trinity Square (Toronto) =

Public square in Toronto, Canada

- Public square
- {{{other_names}}}
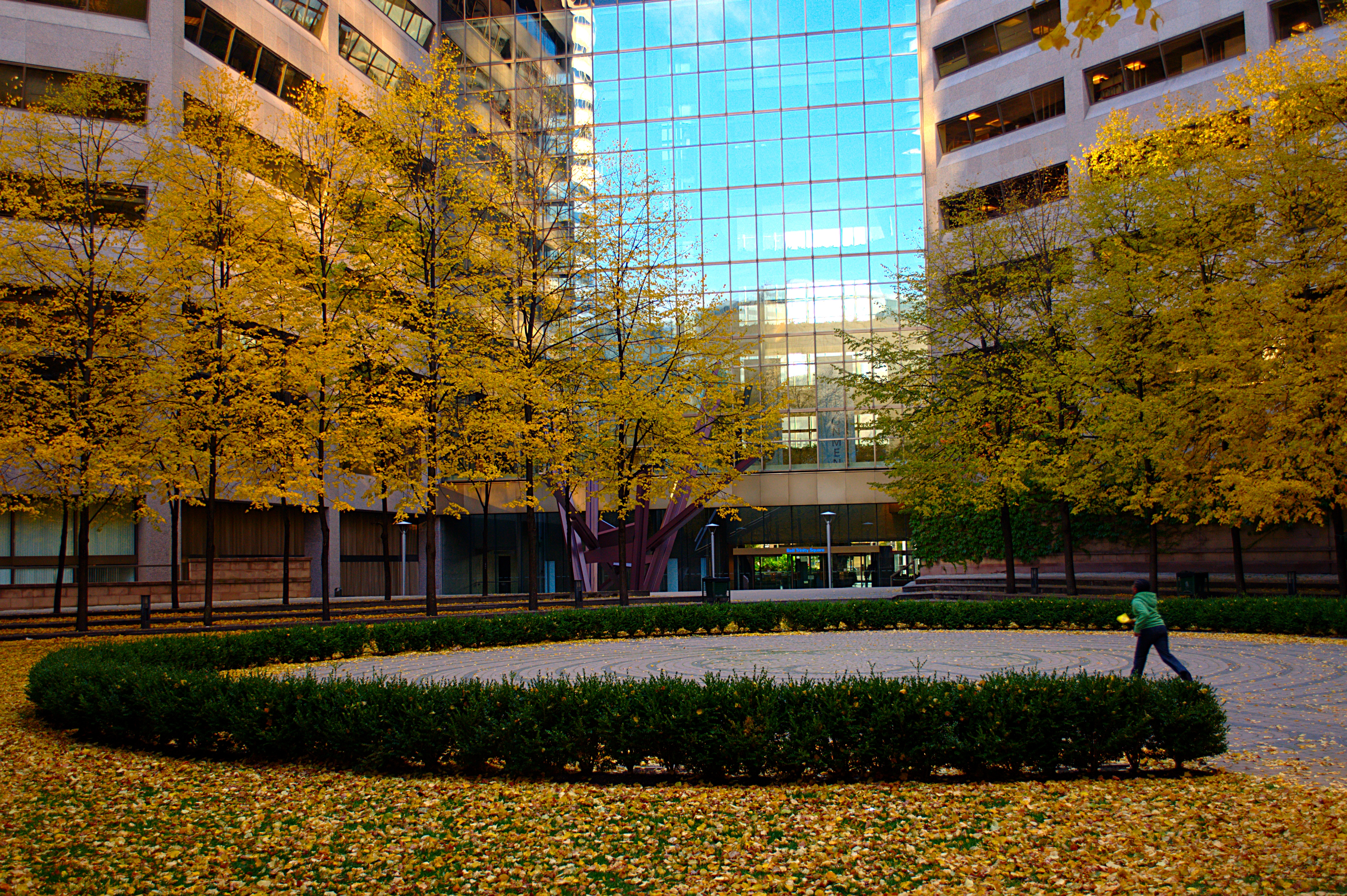
- Toronto Public Labyrinth at Trinity Square
- Features: Labyrinth, water features
- Surface: Granite, concrete
- Location: East of Bay Street, south of Dundas Street West in Toronto, Ontario, Canada
- Location of Trinity Square in Toronto
- Coordinates: 43°39′16″N 79°22′55″W

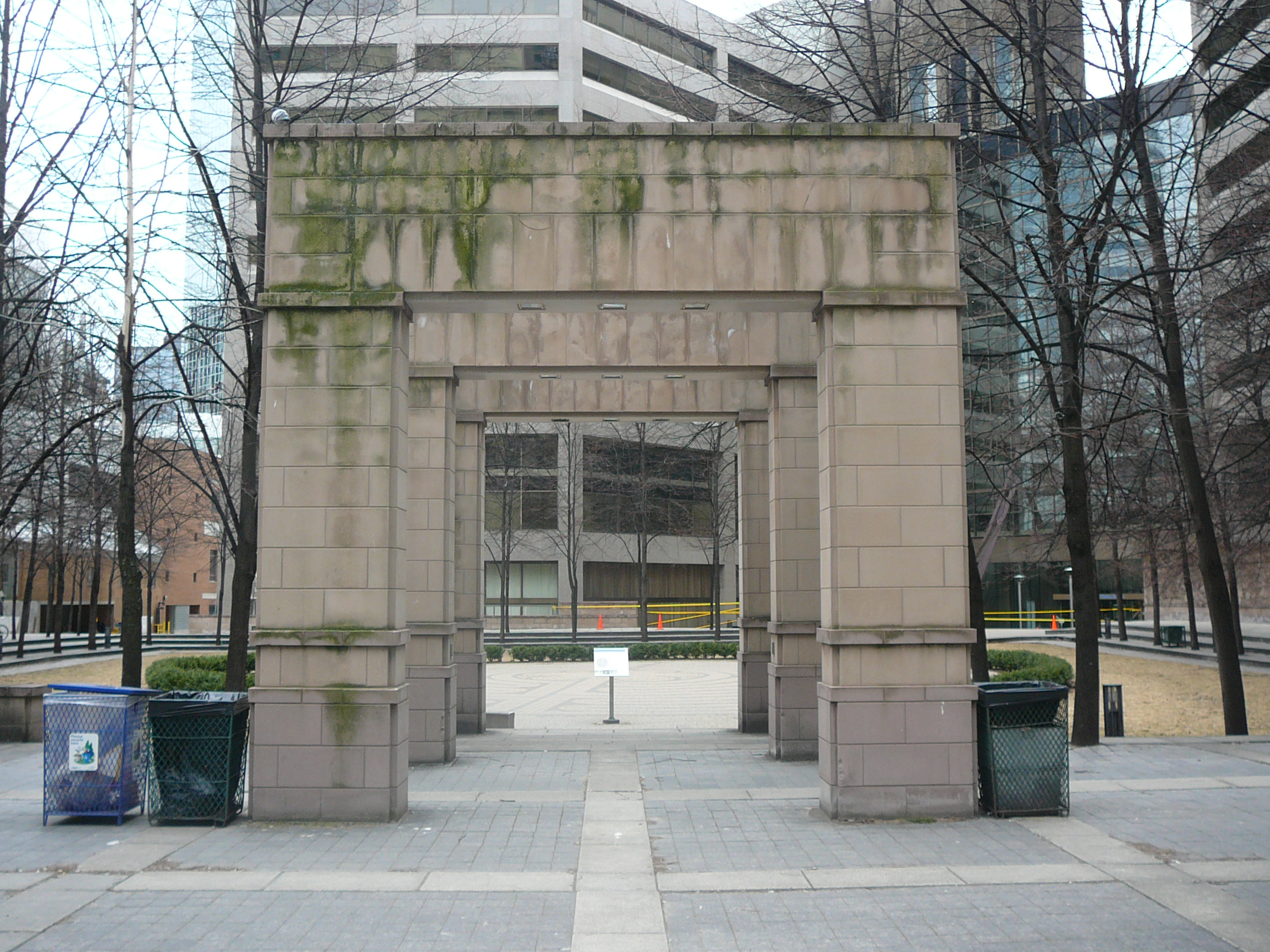
Influenced by the lower level of the former Eaton's House Furnishing Building, arches in Trinity Square serve as the entrance to the Toronto Public Labyrinth

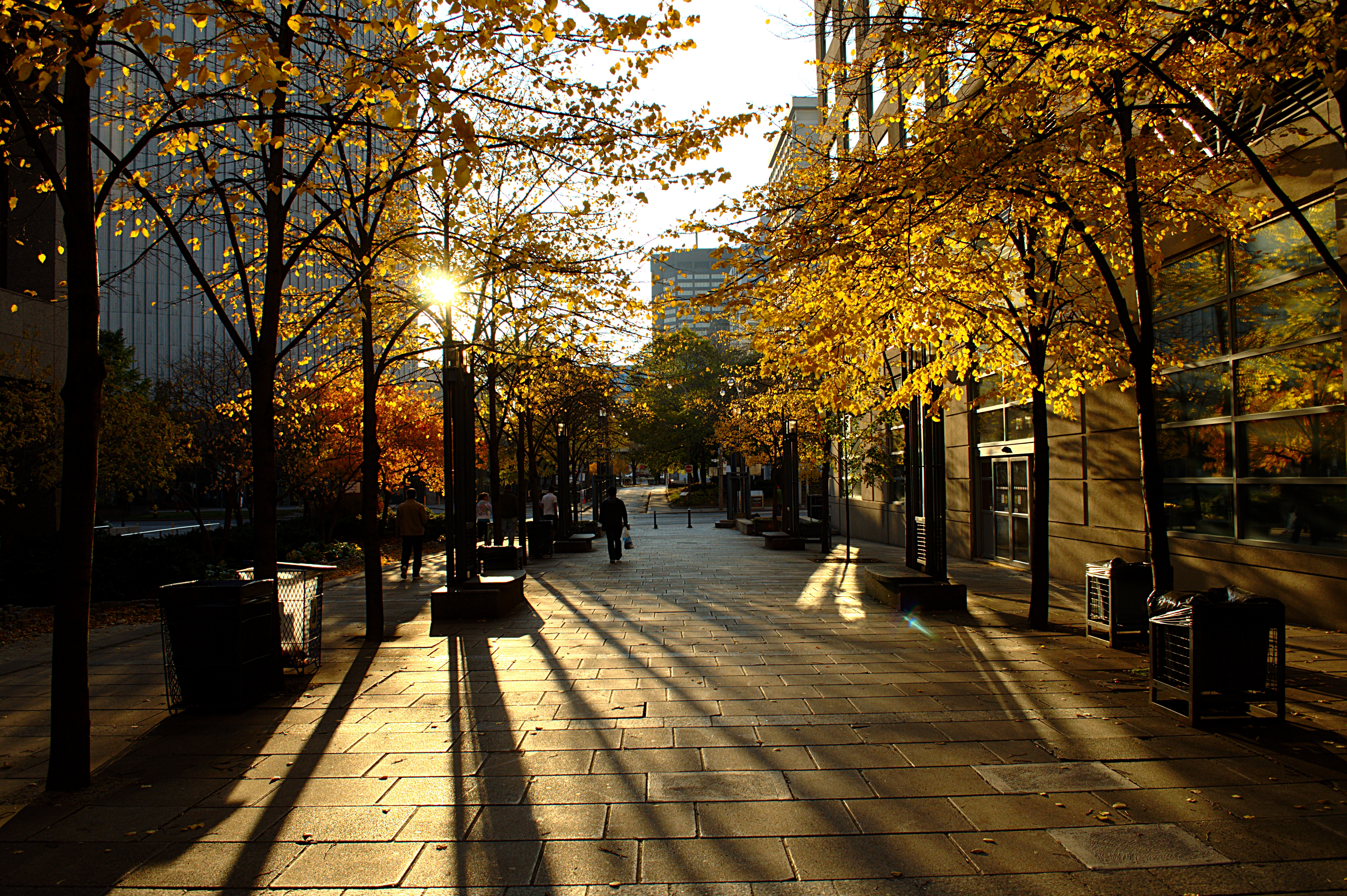
Walkway linking Trinity Square with Bay Street (looking towards Bay Street)

Trinity Square is a public square in downtown Toronto, Ontario, Canada. It is bounded on the east by the Toronto Eaton Centre, on the south and west by the Bell Trinity Square office complex, and on the north by the Marriott Downtown Eaton Centre hotel.

The square's main feature is the Church of the Holy Trinity, an Anglican church. The Holy Trinity Rectory and the Henry Scadding House are heritage buildings that are also located there. The square includes a fountain and ornamental pond, and a labyrinth path.

Trinity Square's primary street access is via James Street, which extends north from Queen Street West between the Eaton Centre and Toronto's Old City Hall. The square can also be accessed by walkways from Bay Street and Dundas Street West, as well as through the Eaton Centre.

== History ==
The square was once the 'Terauley' estate of John Simcoe Macaulay (Terauley Cottage), which had been acquired by his father James Macaulay in 1797. Macaulay sold the house and land in 1845, giving land for the construction of the Church of the Holy Trinity.

By 1900, the area around the church became the Eaton's Annex. The site of Bell Trinity Square, an office building built in 1982 by John B. Parkin Associates, was once home to the 10-floor Eaton's House Furnishing Building, built in 1919.

During the 1970s, the Eaton's complex came down after a fire and demolition. The church and square were threatened by demolition to make way for the Toronto Eaton Centre. The parishioners of the church successfully resisted and forced the mall's design to be changed, preserving the church. Protests from Toronto citizens also led to the preservation of Old City Hall south of the square.

== Design ==
The landscaped square is paved with a combination of granite and precast concrete block pavers arranged in different patterns. Its walkways are lined with densely planted trees. There is a water feature consisting of a tall outlet of water falling from a wall into an ornamental pond. Water also flows through an artificial stream beside the walkway to Bay Street. This walkway is designed with the Church of the Holy Trinity as a terminating vista. It also extends views of the church to Hagerman Street on the north side of Toronto City Hall and to the podium of City Hall itself. At Bay Street, the walkway is flanked by two lanterns mounted on tall columns composed of exposed metal frames, painted blue. The columns are defined by three sections, with the widest at the bottom. They are positioned towards the edges of the walkway to complement and frame the two towers of the Church of the Holy Trinity and to provide a formal entrance to the square.

Adjacent to the church is a clock tower similar in scale and construction to the columns at Bay Street. In addition, there are three large colonnade-like structures which serve as an entrance to the Toronto Public Labyrinth. The labyrinth is an ancient symbol dating back more than three thousand years. It is a universal symbol of pilgrimage and of our journey through life. A labyrinth has only one path and, unlike a maze, it has no dead ends. The labyrinth pattern at Trinity Square is based on the eleven-circuit labyrinth constructed at the Chartres Cathedral in France, completed in the 13th century. As many labyrinths are found near the water, this labyrinth is located on the former course of Taddle Creek, a stream that has been buried for more than one hundred and fifty years. The granite blocks that have been set into the paving at the entrance to the labyrinth and the nearby water feature in the square serve as reminders of this buried creek. The labyrinth is oriented in the direction of true north, as indicated by the directional lines created with the granite blocks.
