= Corktown, Toronto =

Corktown
- Neighbourhood
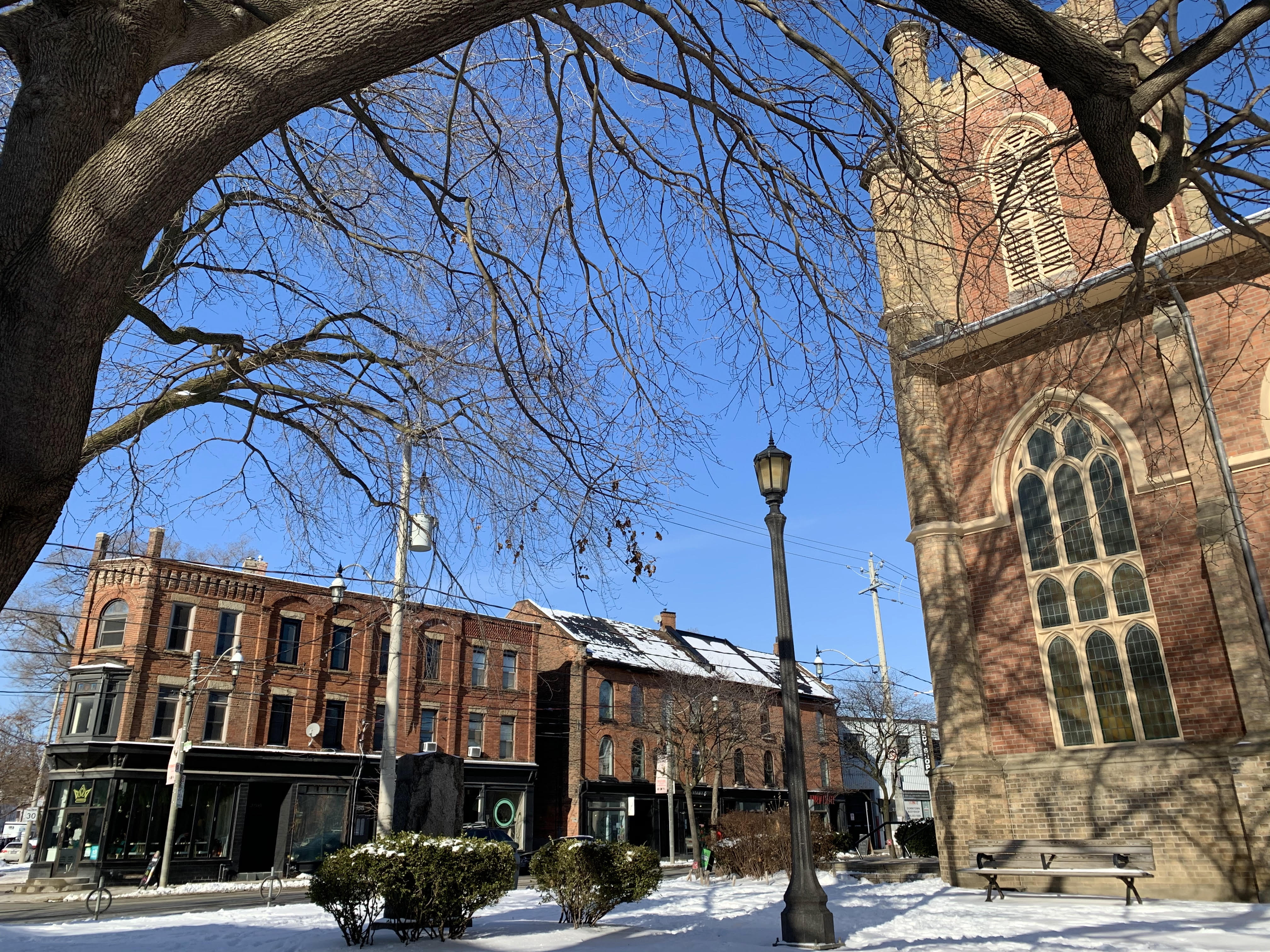
- King Street East and historic Little Trinity Church

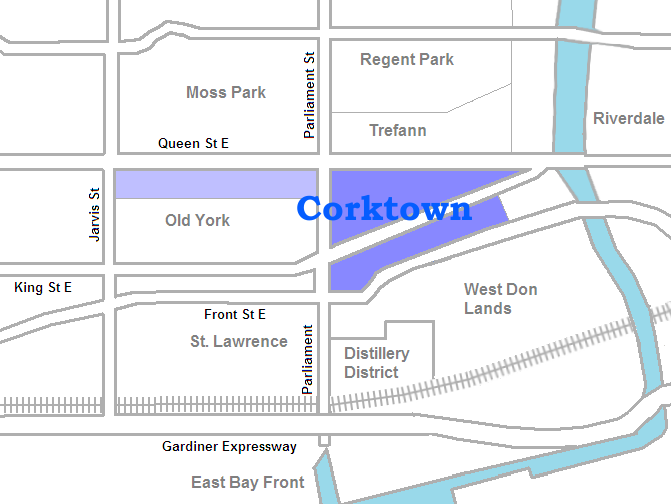
- Map of Corktown according to City of Toronto

- Location within Toronto
- Coordinates: 43°39′20″N 79°21′35″W
- Country: Canada
- Province: Ontario
- City: Toronto

Corktown is an older residential neighbourhood in downtown Toronto, Ontario, Canada. The neighbourhood is south of Shuter Street, north of the Gardiner Expressway, east of Parliament Street, and west of Don River to the east. Corktown contains many vacated industrial buildings, some now used for movie production, and others repurposed for studios and shops. The West Don Lands development is in the south-east corner of this area.

== Toponymy ==
The neighbourhood's name originated in the early 19th century, when the area was an enclave of Irish immigrants, both Protestant and Catholic, said to be primarily from County Cork.

== History ==
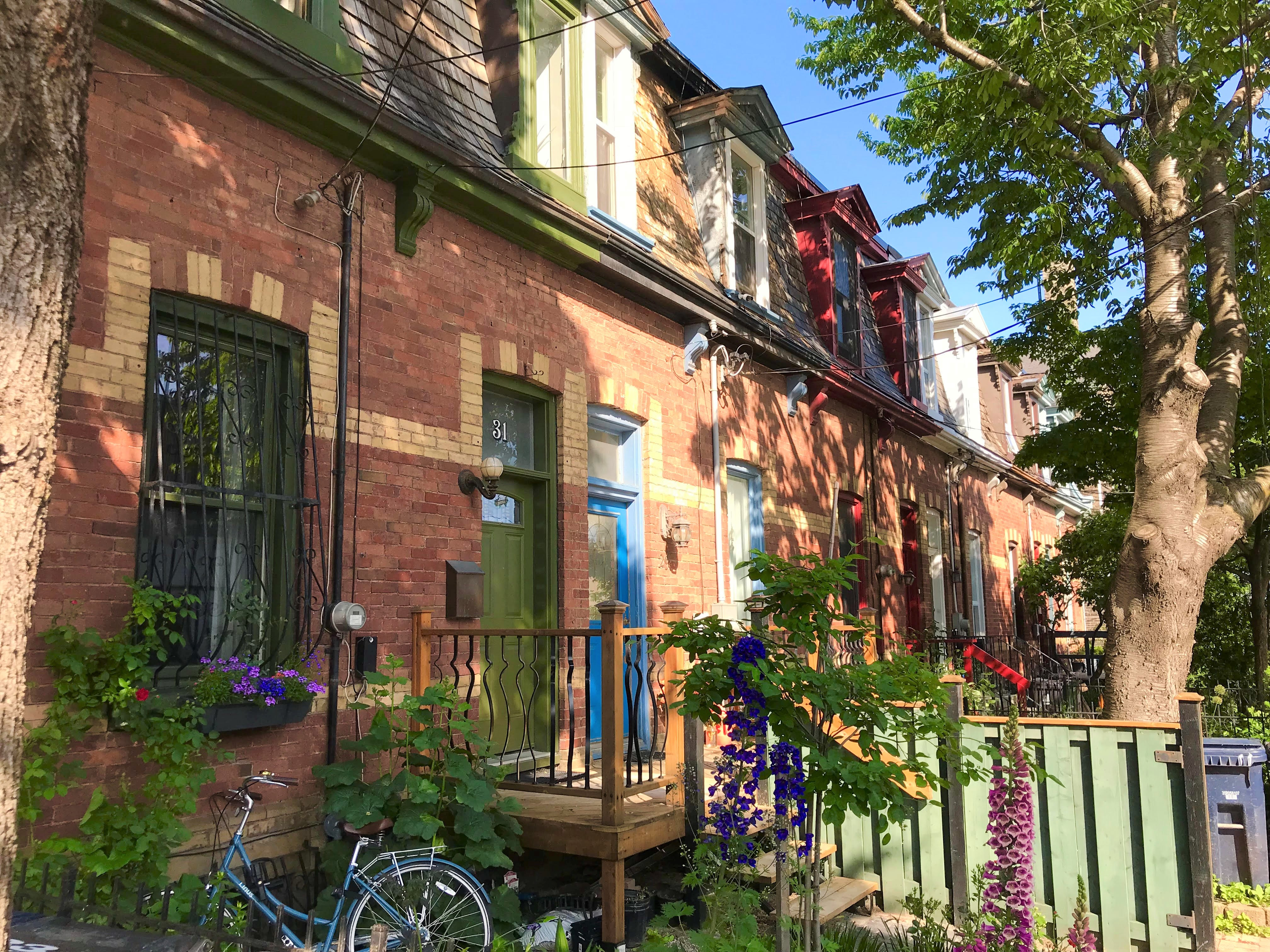
19th-century residences on Sackville Street resembling rowhouses built in Britain during the same period.

In the 19th century, most Corktown residents found employment at one of the local breweries or brickyards. Some of the original workers' cottages can still be seen in the area. Examples of late 19th-century British-style row-housing can still be seen lining Corktown side streets such as Bright Street, Trinity Street, Wilkins Avenue, Ashby Place and Gilead Place.

The first Roman Catholic church in Toronto, St. Paul's Basilica, is found in Corktown. St. Paul's was originally built in 1822. The current St. Paul's (at Queen St. East and Power Street) dates from 1887. St. Paul's Catholic School is the oldest Catholic elementary school in the city, founded in 1842. Beneath its schoolyard and adjacent to St. Paul's Basilica is an unmarked graveyard which served the Catholic community until 1857.

Protestants could not afford the lofty pew rents at nearby St. James Cathedral (Anglican) and this led to the building of their own Little Trinity Anglican Church in 1843 on King Street East. Little Trinity Church is Toronto's oldest surviving church building, its cornerstone laid on July 20, 1843.

The Enoch Turner School on Trinity Street, was built in 1848. This was Toronto's first 'free school'. Its eponymous benefactor was Enoch Turner, a prominent Corktown brewer and one of Toronto's great philanthropists. The Schoolhouse is now operated as a museum by the Ontario Heritage Trust, offering tours for adults and children and hosting private events. Corktown is also home to Inglenook Community High School on Sackville Street, one of the Toronto District School Board's alternative schools. Its building dates to 1887.

In the early 1960s, a significant amount of Corktown was demolished to make way for several elevated roadways, including the Richmond Street off-ramp from the Don Valley Parkway and the re-routed Eastern Avenue overpass. Among the most significant buildings destroyed was the House of Providence (1857–1962), an institution run by the Sisters of St. Joseph to care for orphans and the elderly poor.

In 2031, the under-construction Ontario Line is scheduled to open and provide an underground light metro station named Corktown to serve the neighbourhood.

== Notable persons ==
- Tomson Highway - former resident
- Pierre Berton - former resident
- John Sewell - former resident
- William Joseph O'Connor - former resident

== See also ==
- Corktown Common, adjacent to Corktown, the municipal park is located in the West Don Lands
