= Little Trinity Anglican Church =

Coordinates: 43°39′11.5″N 79°21′43″W

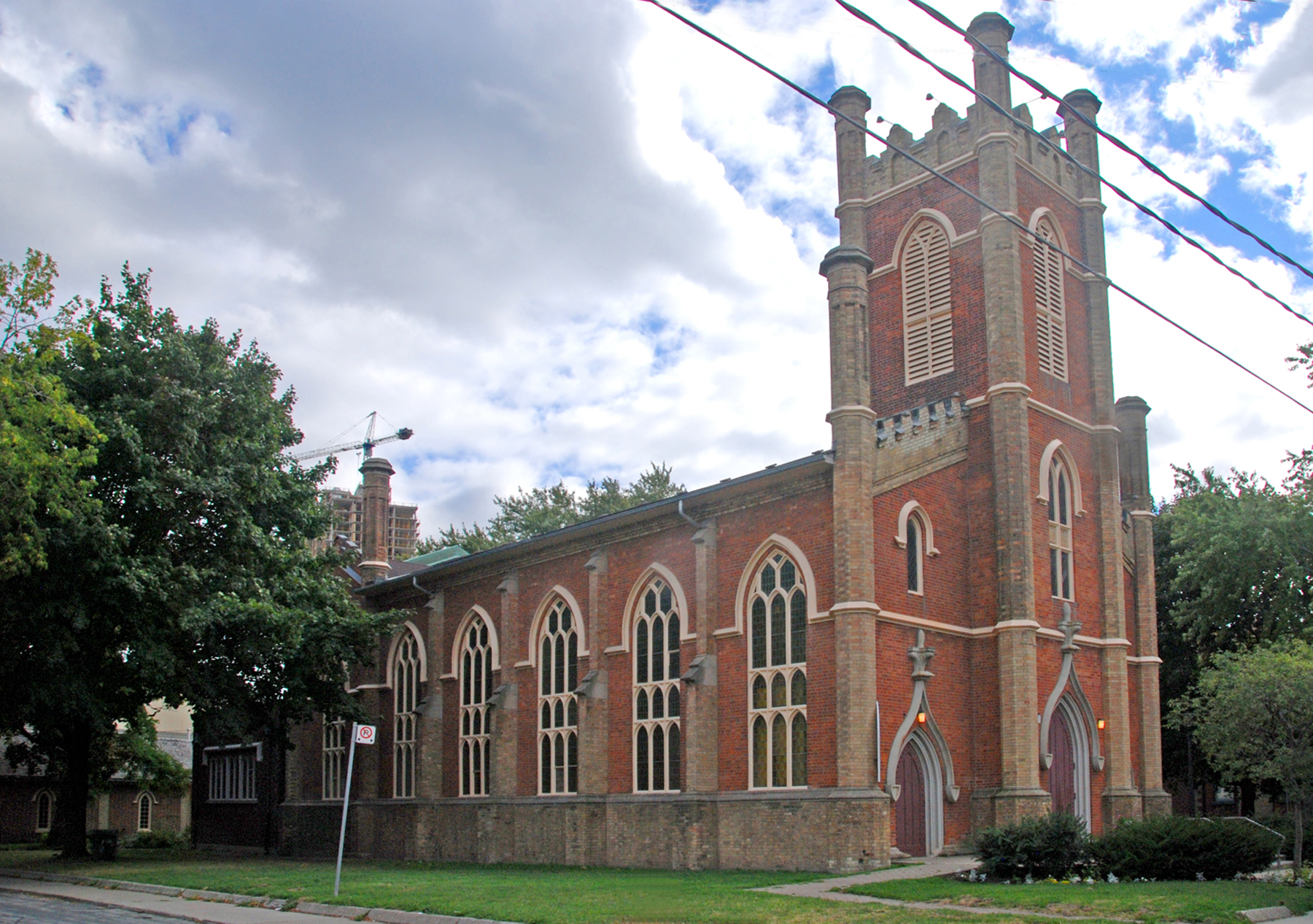
- View of the church in 2007
- Little Trinity Anglican Church
- Location: 425 King Street East, Toronto, Ontario
- Denomination: Anglican Church of Canada
- Tradition: Evangelical Anglicanism
- Website: www.littletrinity.org

History
- Dedication: Trinity

Architecture
- Architect: Henry Bowyer Lane
- Style: Gothic Revival
- Completed: 1844

Administration
- Province: Ontario
- Diocese: Toronto

Clergy
- Rector: The Rev. Timothy Haughton

Little Trinity Anglican Church (officially Trinity East) is a parish church of the Anglican Church of Canada. It is located at 425 King Street East in the Corktown neighbourhood in downtown Toronto, Ontario, Canada. An Ontario Heritage Trust plaque at the site says that the 1844 church is the oldest surviving church in the city.

== History ==
The cornerstone for the Gothic Revival church was laid on July 20, 1843, and the first services were held in February 1844.

The architect was Henry Bowyer Lane.

In 1889, the church was enlarged to provide 600 seats for the congregation. Part of the addition was destroyed by fire in early 1961. After 14-months of reconstruction, the congregation returned in March 1962. During this renovation, the floor of the nave was raised 4 ft (1.2 m) to allow for construction of an activity hall on the lower level.

== Gallery ==
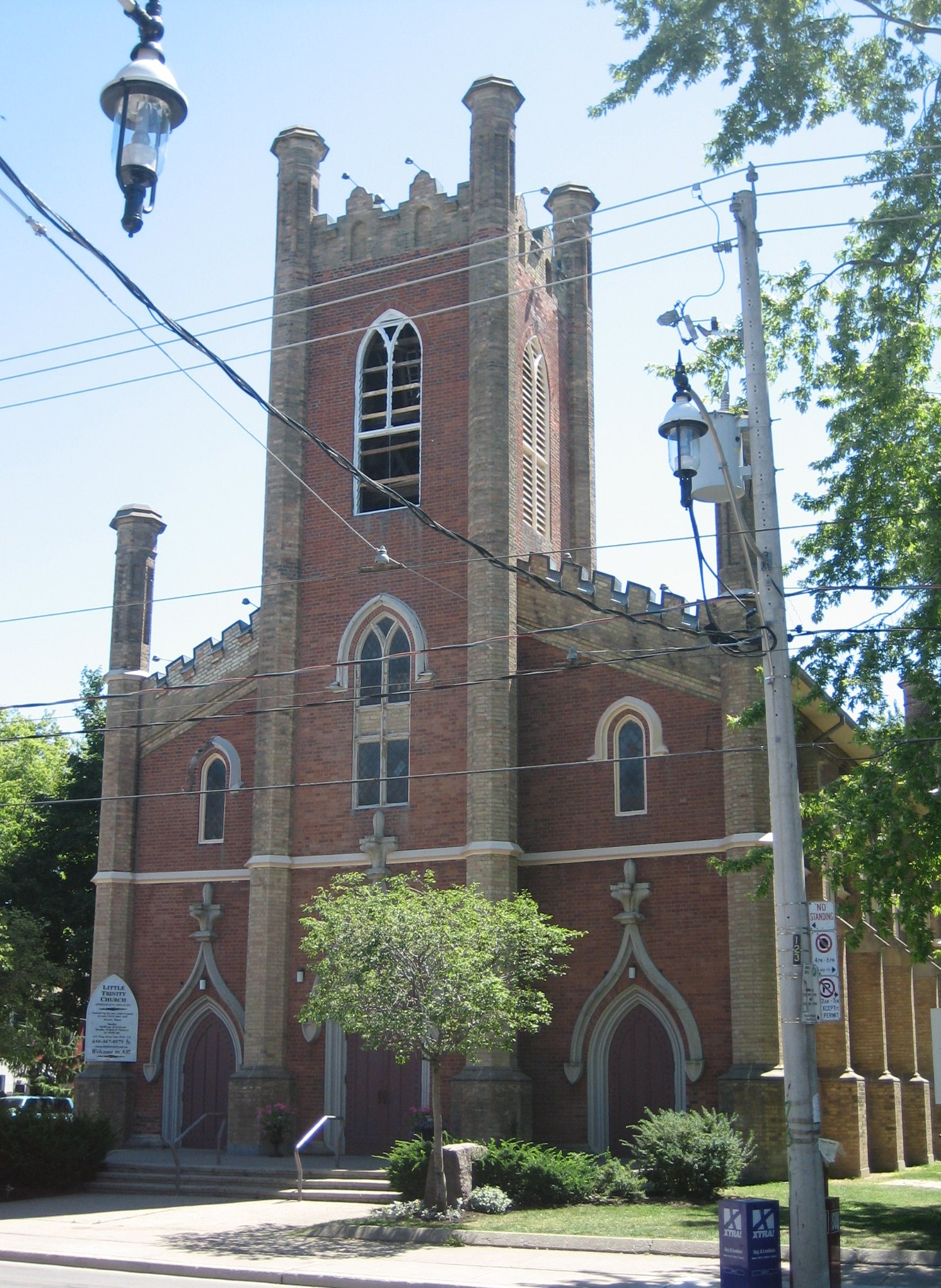
Front of the church

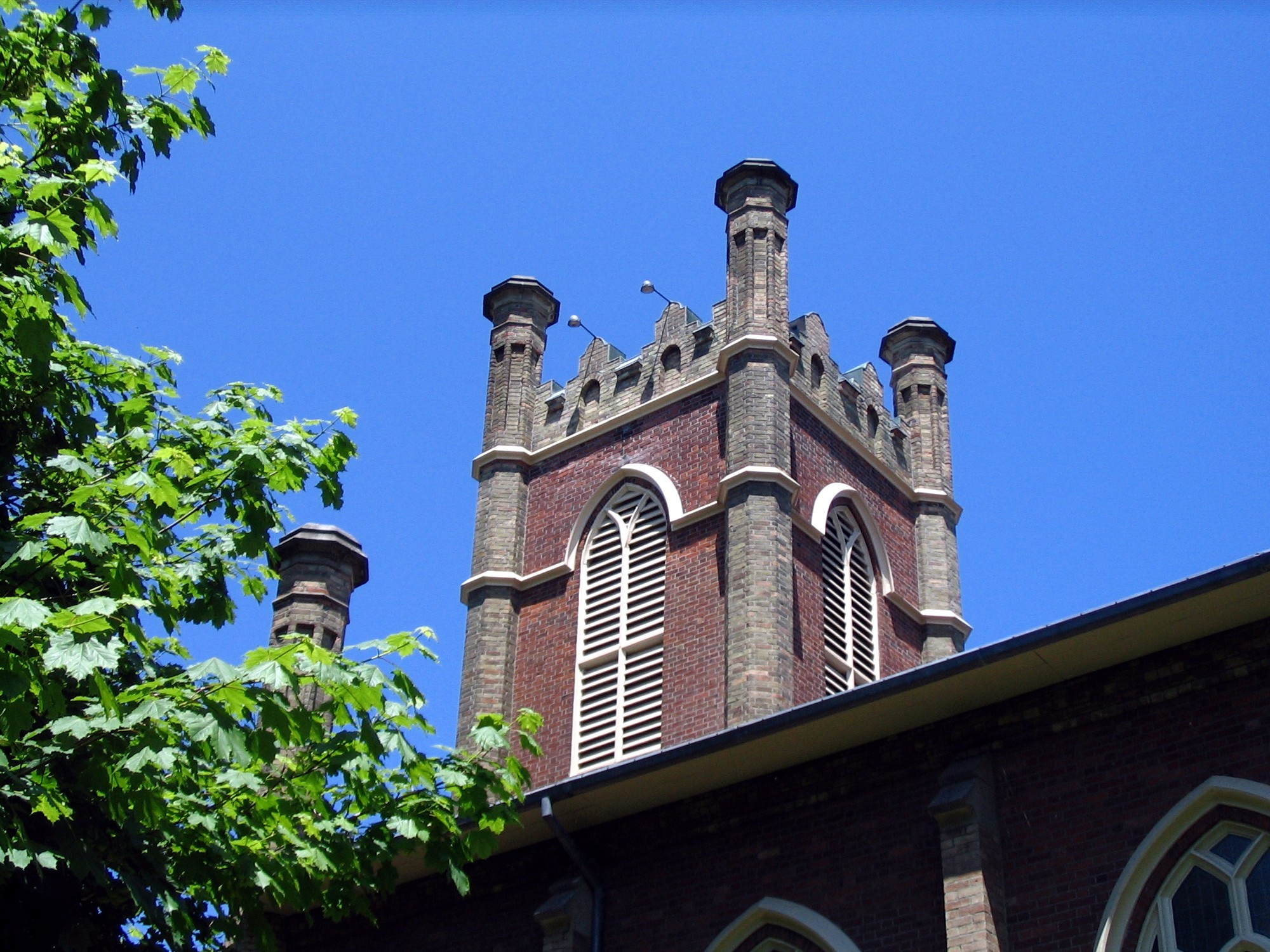
The bell tower

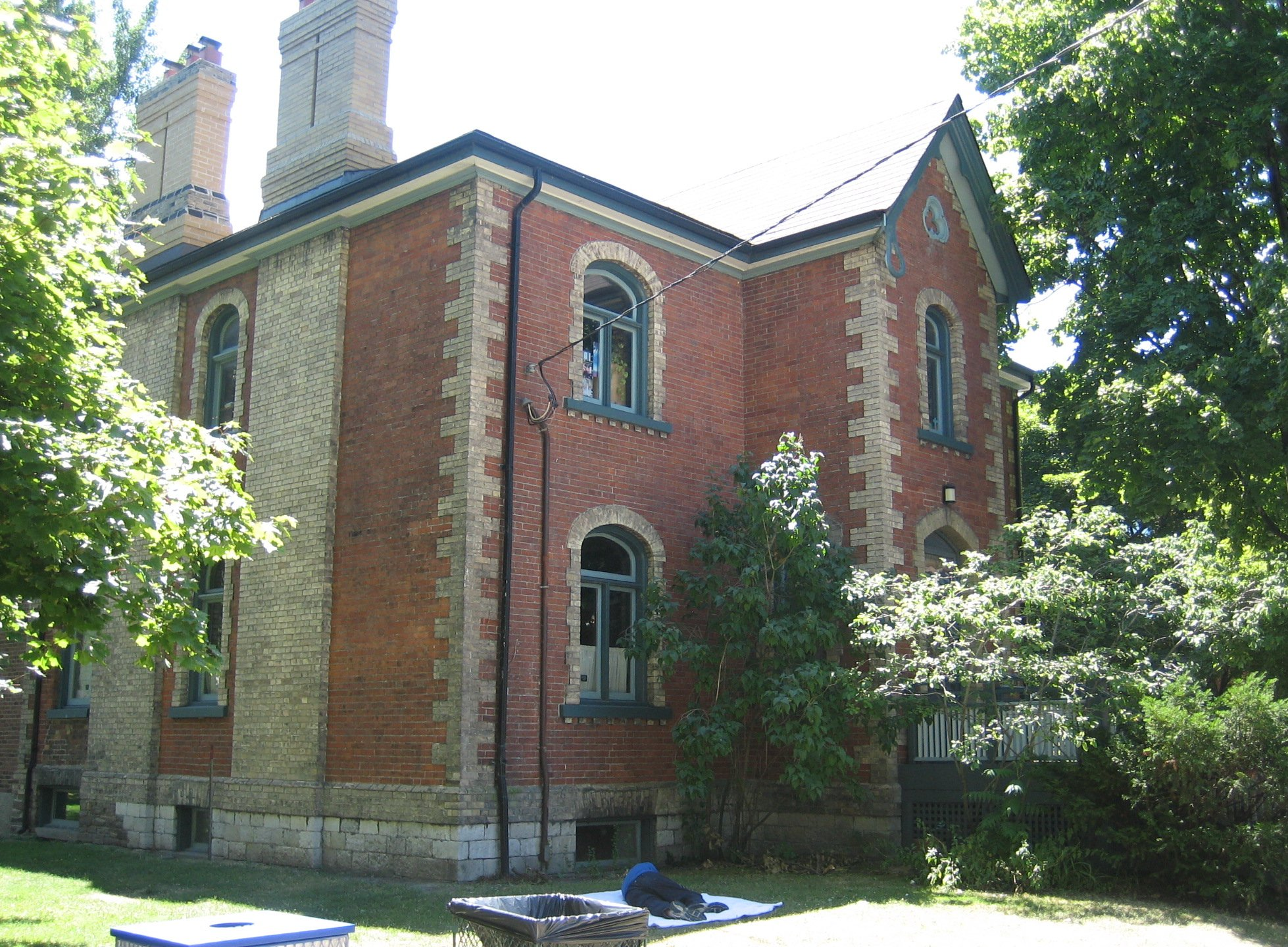
The rectory

== See also ==
- List of oldest buildings and structures in Toronto
- List of Anglican churches in Toronto
