= City Shul =

Reform synagogue in Toronto, Canada

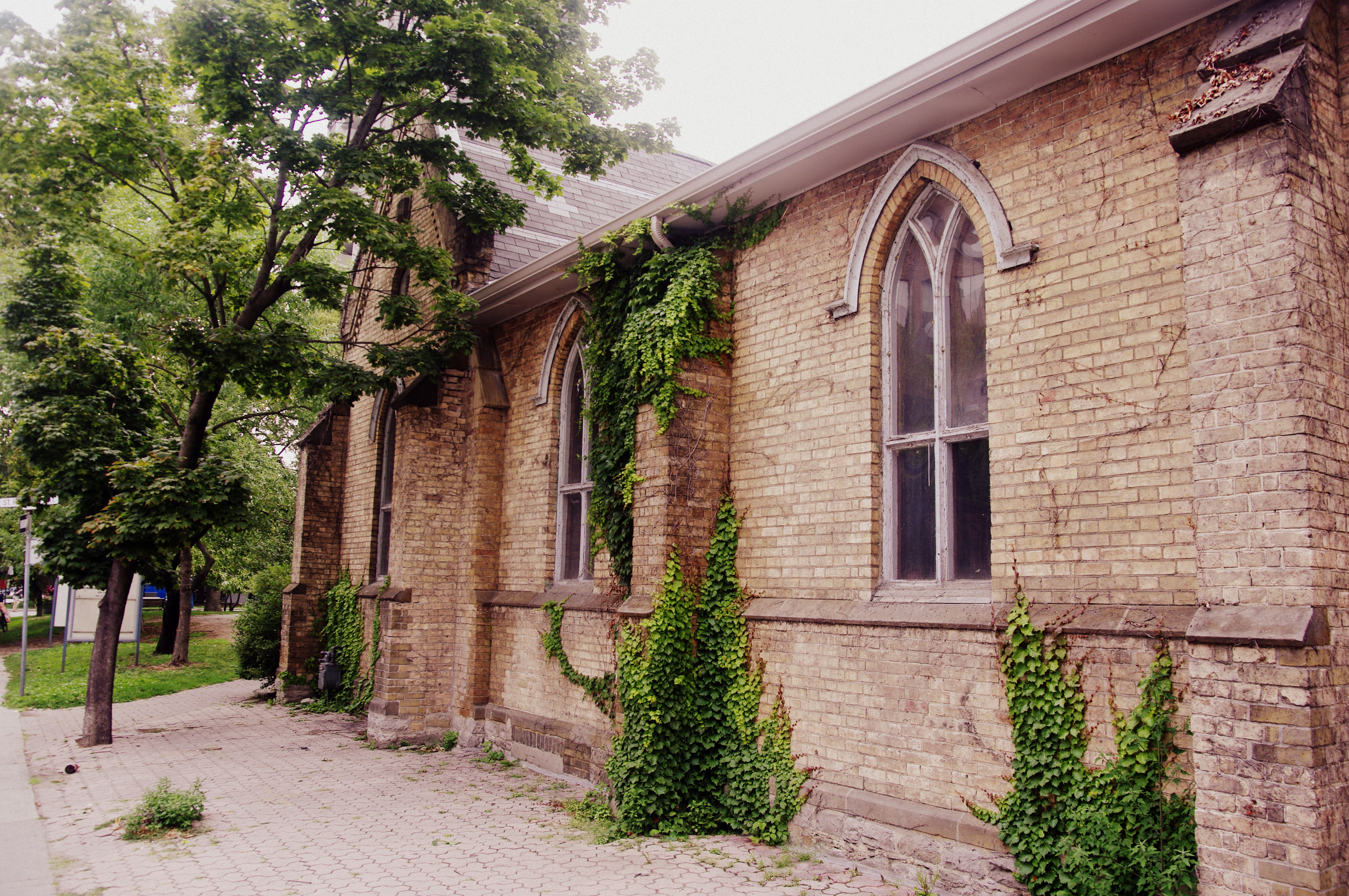
- The exterior of St George by the Grange Church, in which the synagogue meets

- Location in Toronto

Religion
- Affiliation: Reform Judaism
- Ecclesiastical or organisational status: Synagogue
- Leadership: Rabbi Stephanie Crawley, Rabbi Danny Gottlieb, Rabbi Dr Elyse Goldstein, Rabbi Emerita
- Status: Active

Location
- Location: St George by the Grange, 30 Stephanie Street, Toronto, Ontario M5T 1X6
- Country: Canada
- Administration: Union for Reform Judaism
- Coordinates: 43°40′02″N 79°24′07″W

Architecture
- Established: October 2012

Website
- www.cityshul.ca

City Shul is a Reform synagogue in downtown Toronto, founded in October 2012 and currently led by Rabbi Stephanie Crawley, following the retirement of founding Rabbi Elyse Goldstein, with Rabbi Danny Gottlieb acting as Transition Rabbi. Until September 2017, the congregation met at the Wolfond Centre for Jewish Campus Life, near the St. George campus of the University of Toronto. From 2017 to 2022, it was located in the same building as Bloor Street United Church. Since 2022, the congregation has met at the St George by the Grange.

== History ==
City Shul was founded to serve the growing Jewish population in downtown Toronto. It is part of the Downtown Jewish Community Council of Toronto.

City Shul includes members who are visible minorities, LGBT, Jews-by-choice and people with no Jewish background. The Shul also includes members who were raised in different Jewish traditions, such as Ashkenazi or Sephardi Jews, and those who come from a variety of Jewish religious movements including Orthodox, Conservative, and Reconstructionist. City Shul accepts non-Jews as voting members, with the requirement that members of the Leadership Team be Jewish (by birth or conversion).

Men and women participate equally in services at City Shul. The service is conducted primarily in Hebrew, and the shul uses a prayer book called Siddur Shirat Halev (Song of the Heart), which was developed in a four-year project with more than 70 congregants involved, and designed by Baruch Sienna. Shirat HaLev includes commentary, art and poetry, and is adapted with permission from the Central Conference of American Rabbis prayer book Mishkan T'filah, World Union Edition: A Progressive Siddur.

City Shul was formally accepted as a member of the Union for Reform Judaism in December 2013.
