= St. Thomas's Anglican Church (Toronto) =

Anglican parish in Toronto, Ontario, Canada

St Thomas's Anglican Church
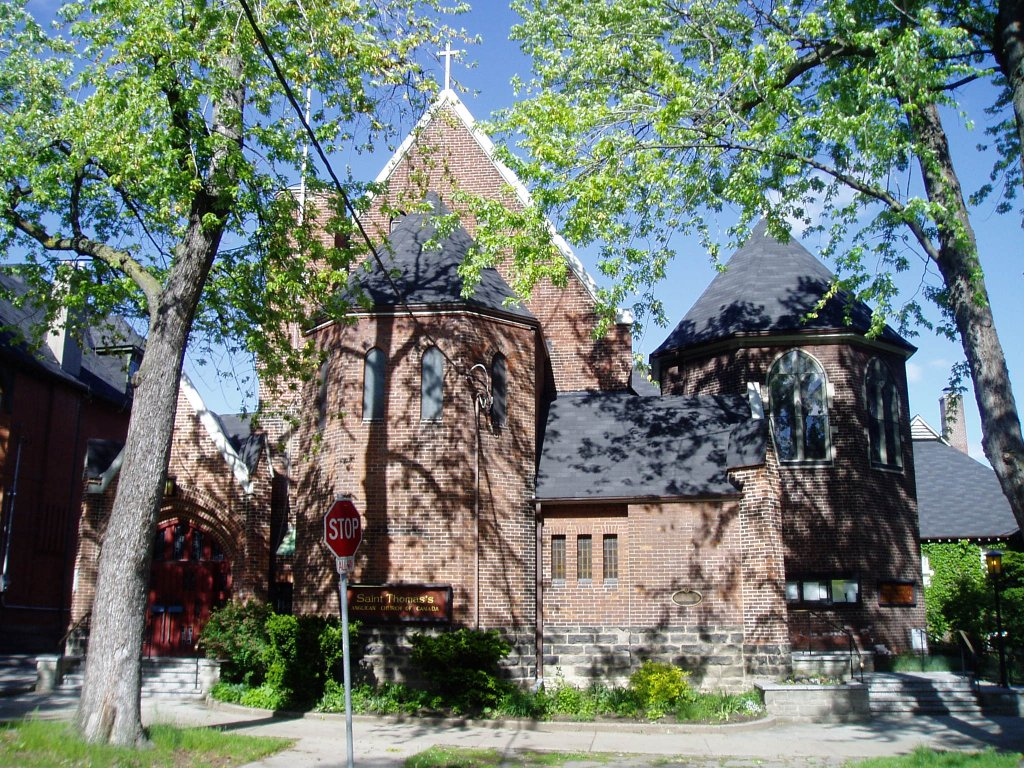

- Location within Toronto
- 43.6659°N 79.4005°W
- Location: 383 Huron Street; Toronto, Ontario; M5S 2G5
- Denomination: Anglican Church of Canada
- Tradition: Anglo-Catholic
- Churchmanship: High Church
- Website: stthomas.on.ca

History
- Founded: 1874
- Dedication: Thomas the Apostle

Architecture
- Heritage designation: Toronto Designated Part IV
- Designated: 1976
- Architect: Eden Smith
- Architectural type: Arts and Crafts

Administration
- Province: Ontario
- Diocese: Toronto
- Archdeaconry: South
- Deanery: Parkdale
- Parish: St Thomas, Huron Street

Clergy
- Rector: Rev. Nathan J.A. Humphrey

St. Thomas's Church, Huron Street is a parish of the Anglican Church of Canada in Toronto, Ontario. One of the earliest Anglo-Catholic congregations in Canada, it was established in 1874, moving twice before settling into its present building, adjacent to the Annex on the western edge of the University of Toronto's downtown St. George campus.

The liturgy and music at St. Thomas's make it a destination church. Many people who do not live within the boundaries of the parish attend its services, especially students, staff, and faculty at the University of Toronto. The parish describes itself as "an active and welcoming Anglo-Catholic parish rooted in Scripture, Reason, and Tradition."

The Rector is Fr. Nathan J. A. Humphrey, who is assisted by honorary associate priests. The music staff are: Organist & Choirmaster Elizabeth Anderson and Assistant Organist & Choirmaster Manuel Piazza.

== History ==
The Arts and Crafts building, designed by architect and parishioner Eden Smith (1858–1949), was opened on January 17, 1893. The First World War Memorial Baptistery with Bromsgrove Guild stained-glass windows designed by Archibald John Davies was completed in 1922.

The aesthetic theorist and poet T. E. Hulme attended St Thomas's while living in Toronto briefly in 1906 after leaving Cambridge University. He is an important figure in Modernist literature, influencing, among others, Ezra Pound and T.S. Eliot. The world-famous English pianist Gerald Moore (1899–1987) grew up and obtained most of his music education in Toronto. In his early life, he was sub-organist at St Thomas's.

The parish's logo was designed by Allan Fleming for its centenary celebrations in 1974.

== Liturgy ==
St. Thomas's is notable for its intricate liturgy, and is known for its high standards in music and liturgy. Liturgy at St. Thomas's is more formal and complex than would be encountered in all but a few Anglican churches in Canada and indeed in the rest of North America today. Of interest is its dedicated Acolytes' Guild and the parish's preservation of complex liturgical roles and minor orders like that of the subdiaconate, which are no longer found in the vast majority of Anglicanism and Western Christianity as a whole, including in contemporary Roman Catholicism. St. Thomas's draws mainly, however, from the high church tradition within Anglicanism, distinct from the Anglican Papalist movement, which takes its inspiration from contemporary Roman Catholicism. This tradition, as former rector Fr. Roy Hoult explains, sought

to rediscover the forms of dress and general tenor of worship that pertained in England prior to their destruction at the time of the Reformation. St. Thomas's is an example of this second kind of Anglo-Catholicism; its lack of lace and the predominance instead of plain albs and long surplices bear witness to this, as does the traditional Anglican arrangement of the chancel with its choir stalls.

Liturgical particularities native to St. Thomas's reflect a notable influence of pre-conciliar Latin Rite practice on the parish as well, which puts St. Thomas's liturgy at the intersection of High Church Anglican and of Tridentine liturgy. The parish is locally nicknamed "Smoky Tom's" for its use of generous quantities of incense. However, influences from the Liturgical Movement of the twentieth century have been somewhat introduced, notably in the replacement of the prayer for the church militant with the prayers of the people, and especially in the contemporary Sung Mass which uses a contemporary text and is celebrated ad populum (towards the people).

St. Thomas's celebrates daily Low Mass and Morning & Evening Prayer, one of the only Anglican parish churches in Toronto which offers such a schedule. Low Mass is celebrated in the Lady Chapel at 12:15 pm on Monday, Wednesday and Friday, at 5:30 pm on Tuesday and Thursday, and at 10:00 am on Saturday. Morning Prayer is said in the chancel from Monday to Friday at 8:30 am, and on Saturday at 9:30 am. Evening Prayer is said in the chancel as well from Monday to Friday at 5:00 pm. The church is open for private prayer daily from early in the morning to closing.

Major Feast Days are usually observed with one or two Low Masses during the day and a Procession and High Mass in the evening. Service details, livestream links, and service leaflets are posted on the parish website.

On a normal Sunday, the services are:

- Mattins, 7:30 a.m. & Low Mass, 8:00 a.m. A spoken ad orientem (eastward-facing) traditional-language service of Morning Prayer and a re-ordered version of the Holy Eucharist in the 1962 Canadian Book of Common Prayer, using the Revised Common Lectionary readings.
- Sung Mass, 9:30 a.m.: A choral versus populum (westward) contemporary-language service, using the 1985 Book of Alternative Services and the Revised Common Lectionary readings.
- High Mass, 11:00 a.m.: A choral ad orientem (eastward-facing) traditional-language service using a re-ordered version of the 1962 Canadian Book of Common Prayer, and the Revised Common Lectionary readings.
- Evensong, 5:00 p.m.: Evensong, adapted from the 1962 Canadian Book of Common Prayer, is sung every Sunday evening. Evensong is accompanied by either Eucharistic adoration or benediction of the Blessed Sacrament. See the parish website for the practice of the week.

Sung Mass, High Mass, and Evensong are livestreamed on YouTube. See the parish website.

== Music ==
Music is an important part of the liturgy and mission of St. Thomas's and the high calibre of the music program attracts talent to St Thomas's. Past Directors of Music include John Tuttle, who served from 1989 to 2016 in the post, along with Matthew Larkin and Matthew Whitfield. The famous English accompanist Gerald Moore, who grew up in Toronto, was briefly an assistant organist at St. Thomas's. Elizabeth Anderson was Interim Organist and Choirmaster from July 2016 until August 2017, and was further appointed Interim Director of Music in September 2022. In March 2023, Anderson became the parish's permanent choirmaster. Manuel Piazza was also appointed organist and assistant choirmaster in the same month.

There are three choral services each Sunday. The choristers are mainly volunteers, with paid section leads. To date, the choir has toured to the U.K. three times in 2005, 2010, and 2013 to serve as choir-in-residence in cathedrals during the summer.

In September 2023, St. Thomas’s established the St. Thomas’s Choristers, a free music education program for children in Grades 2 to 12. From September to May each year, the St. Thomas’s Choristers lead the music at the 9:30 Sung Mass. The adult choirs lead the music at the High Mass and Evensong, as well as on feast days during the week, and in Holy Week.

== Parish culture ==
St. Thomas's publishes a weekly e-newsletter called The Thurible, which regularly includes a letter from the rector. The parish sponsors a Friday Food Ministry program and has a long tradition of refugee sponsorship. All are supported by volunteers from the parish and the community. It also occasionally hosts meetings of the Society of Mary, although these meetings also occur at St. Bartholomew's Anglican Church in Regent Park.

Many St. Thomas's parishioners are active as performers, writers, and artists, and the church has participated in events like Nuit Blanche and Doors Open Toronto.

The parish, although well-known for its liturgical conservatism, houses a sizable portion of parishioners who embrace a more liberal Anglo-Catholicism, following trends in the Anglican Church of Canada, although theologically traditional elements remain alive and well.

On Sunday mornings, there is a small church school and youth group. The church also conducts an adult Christian education program, including programs targeted to young adults, study series during the Lent and Advent seasons, discussion groups, and occasional lectures. From 2006 to 2015, there was also an active St Elmo's Youth Group; some of its members have gone on to serve as choristers and acolytes.

== University connections ==
The church has had a long relationship with Trinity College, which hosts a theology department in the Liberal Catholic tradition. More recently, it has mended ties with Wycliffe College, a seminary in the evangelical Anglican tradition, which as recently as the late 1930s banned its students from entering St. Thomas's. Nowadays, however, seminarians from both Trinity and Wycliffe serve regularly during the academic term, involved in the liturgy and many aspects of parish, such as the Friday Food Ministry. Other students of Toronto School of Theology-affiliated institutions are involved in the parish as well.

St. Thomas's is the closest parish church for students of the Toronto School of Theology and of the wider University of Toronto. The church has an active outreach program to university students, and students of the University of Toronto are active in its various guilds and activities, most notably the weekly university-level bible study, as well as being general parishioners.

== Gallery ==
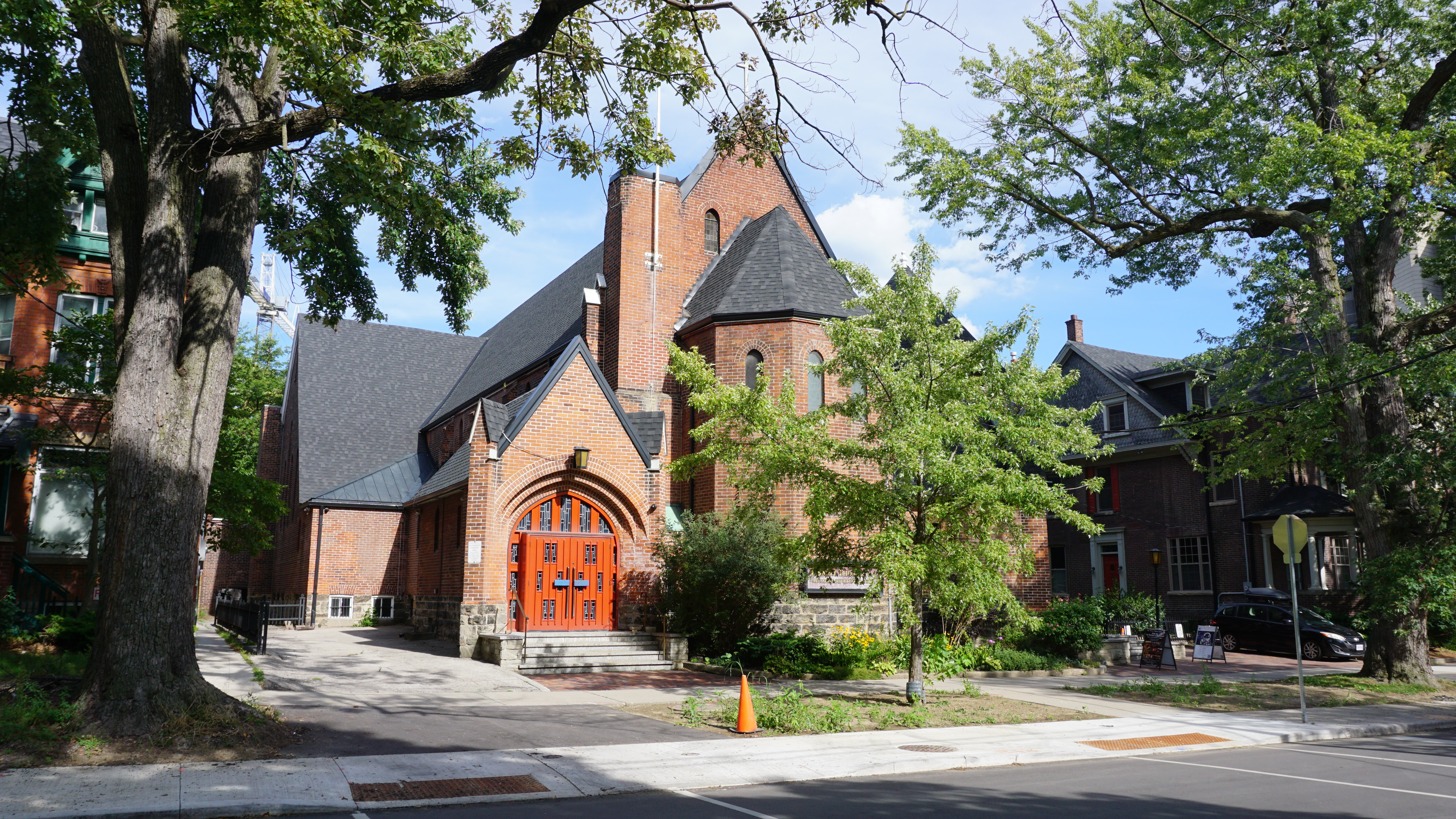
Northwest view

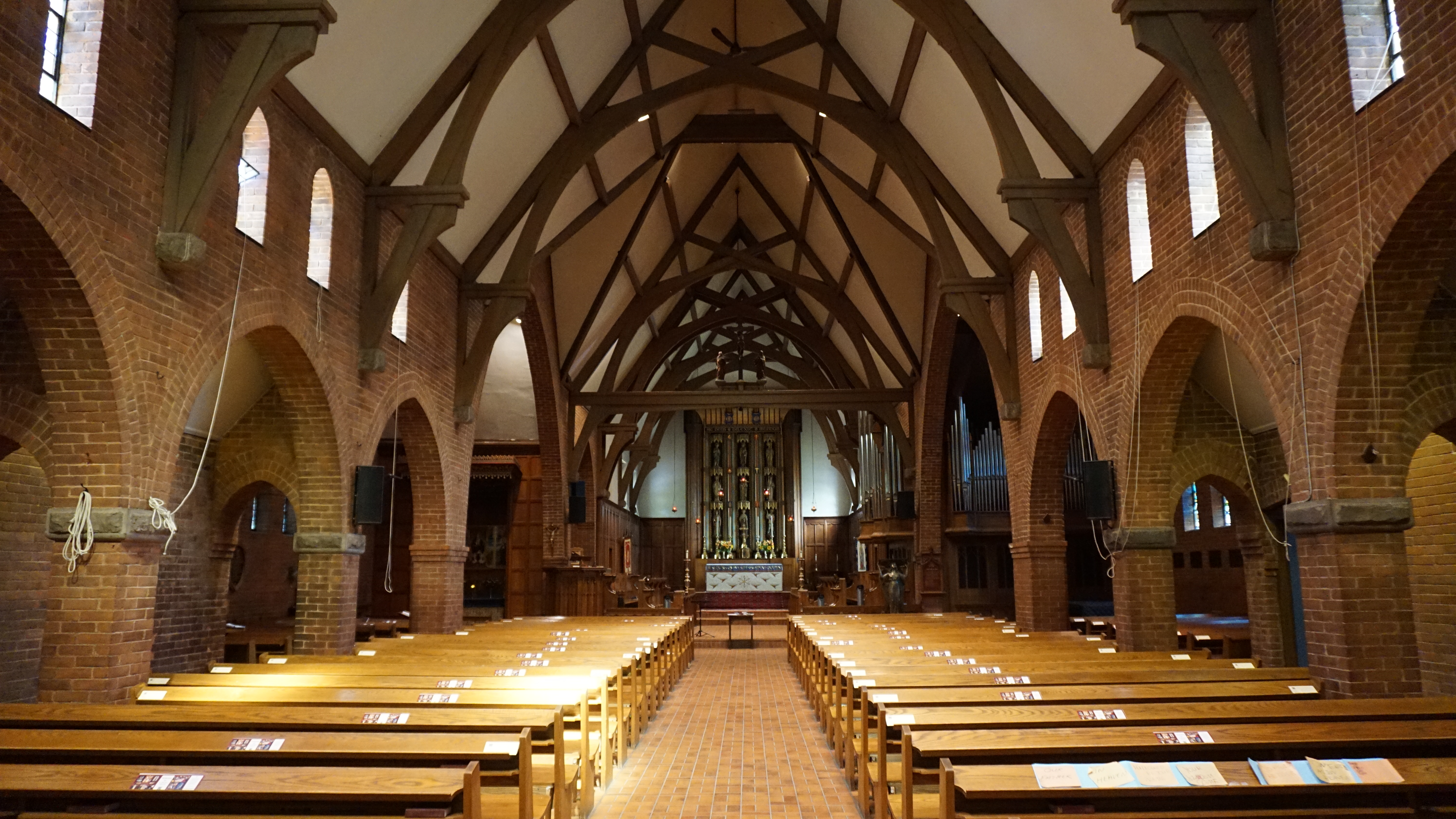
Nave

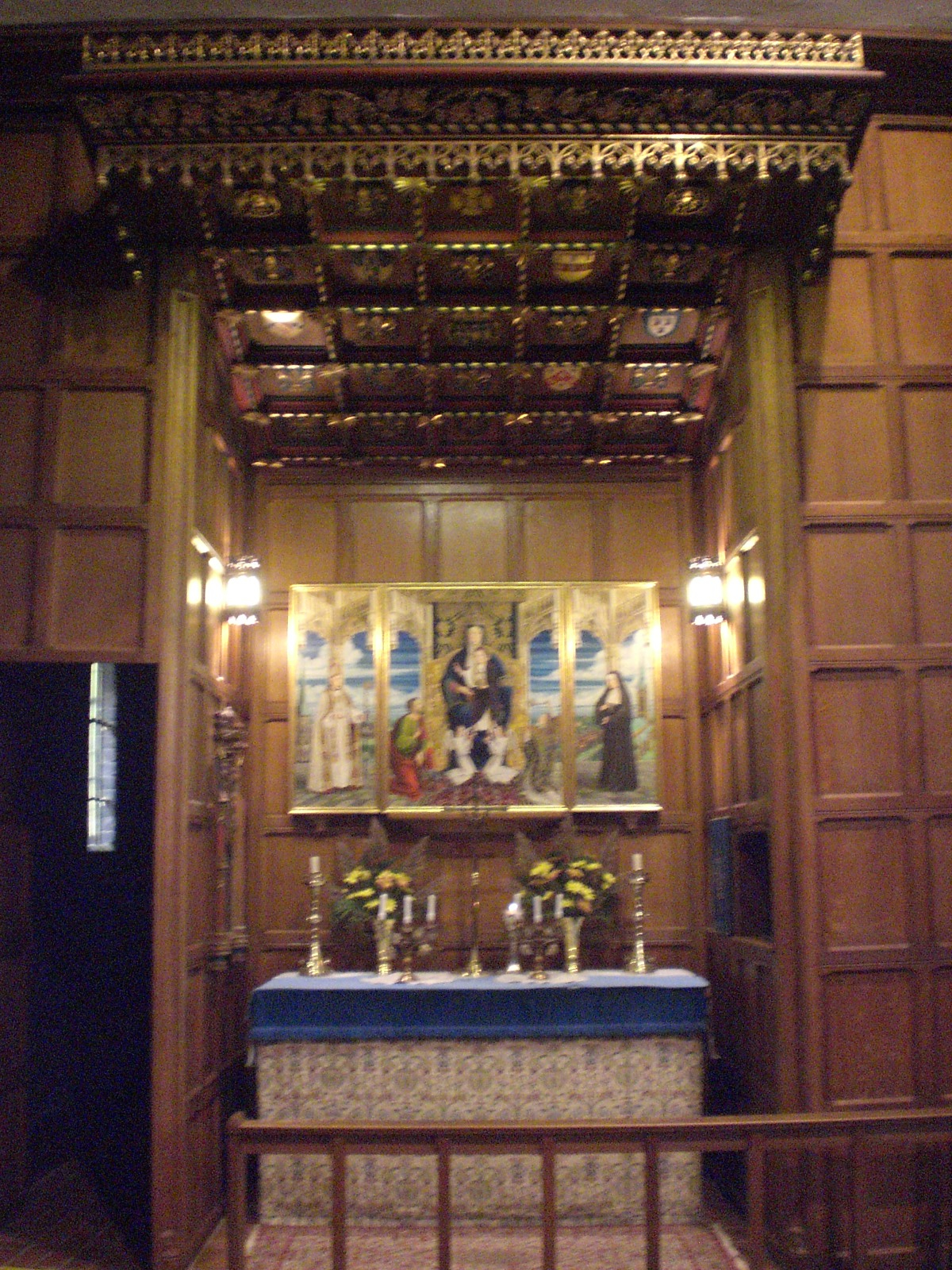
Lady Chapel

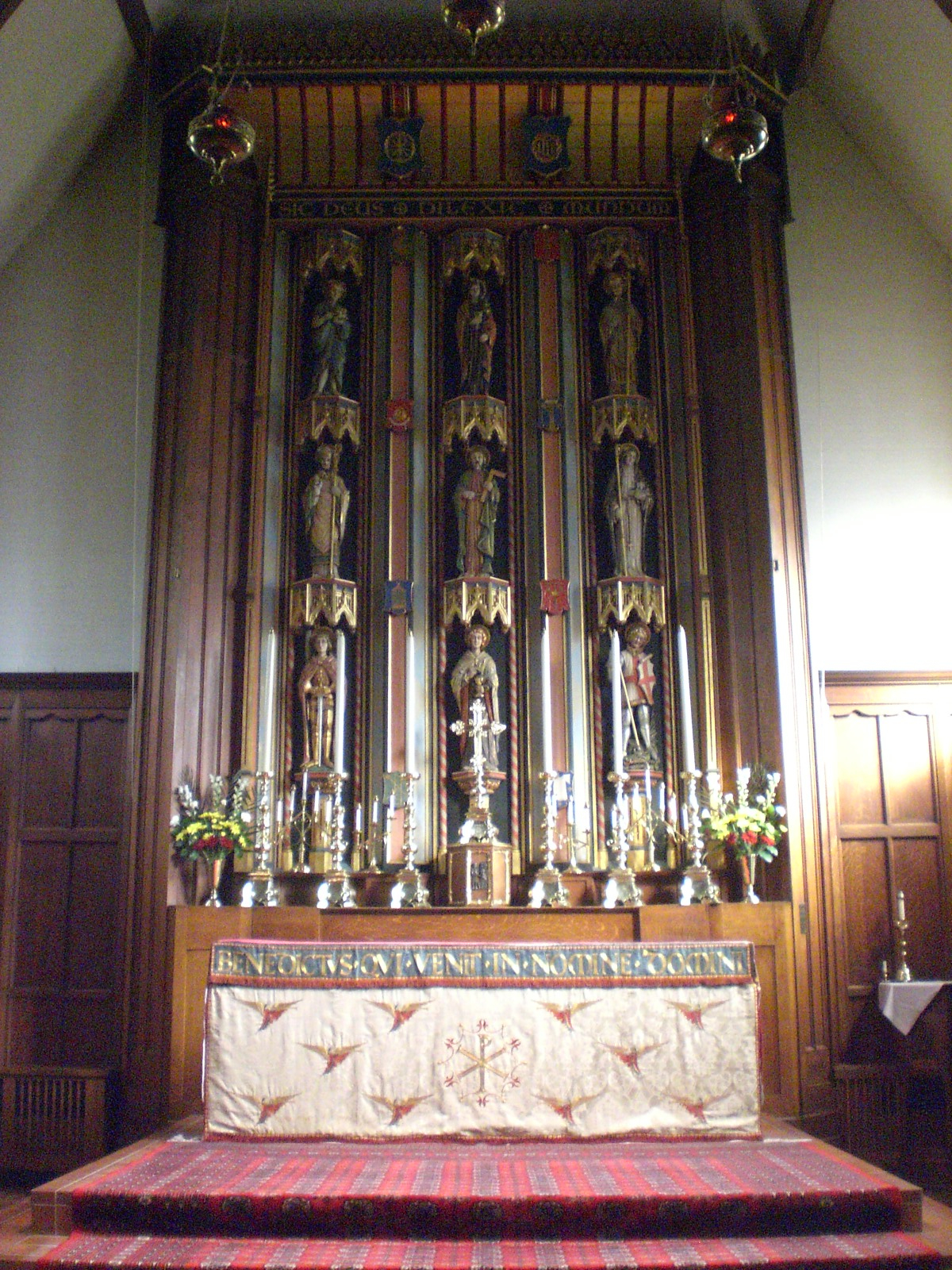
Sanctuary

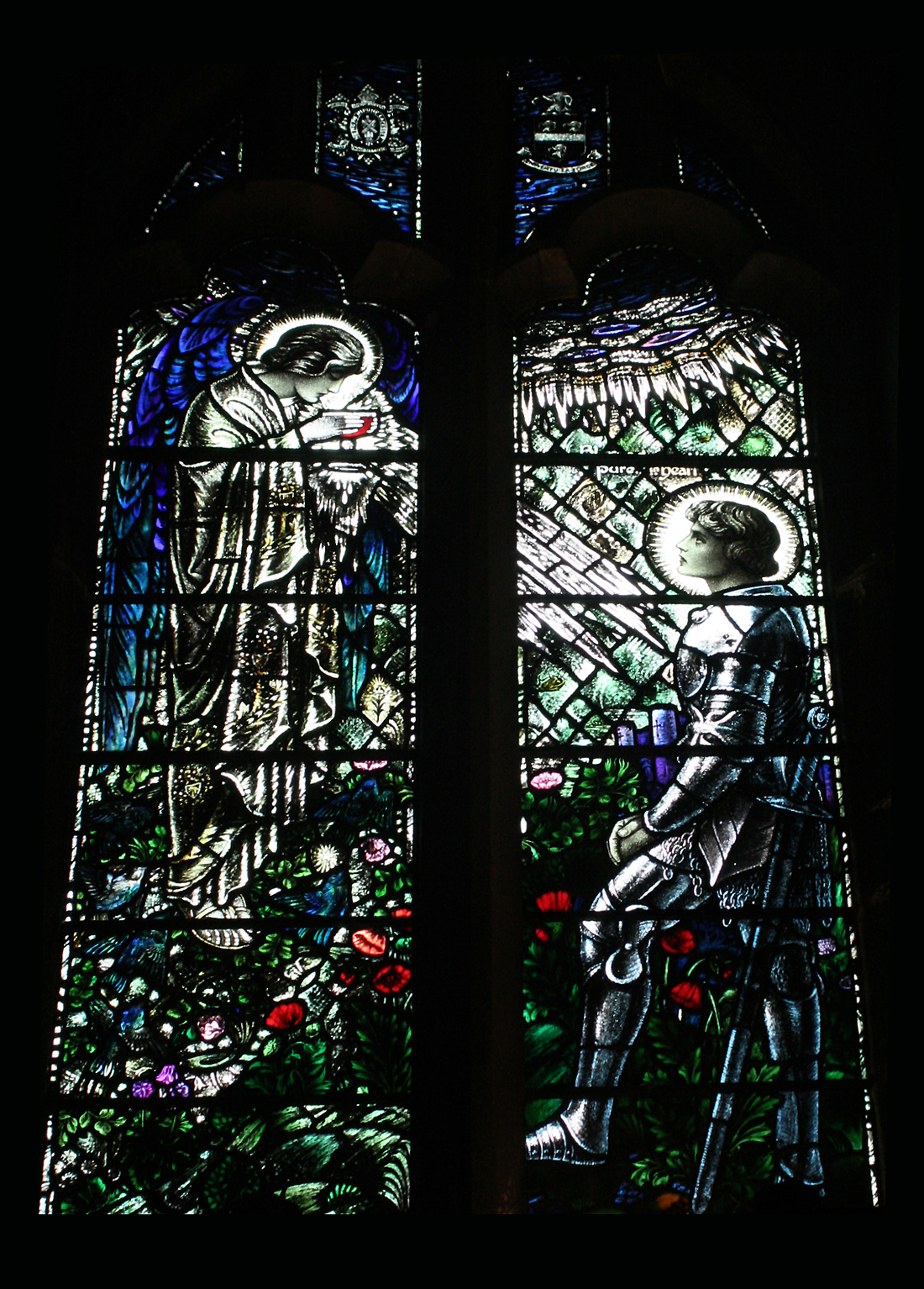
Baptistery stained glass window, Design Archibald John Davies, Bromsgrove Guild

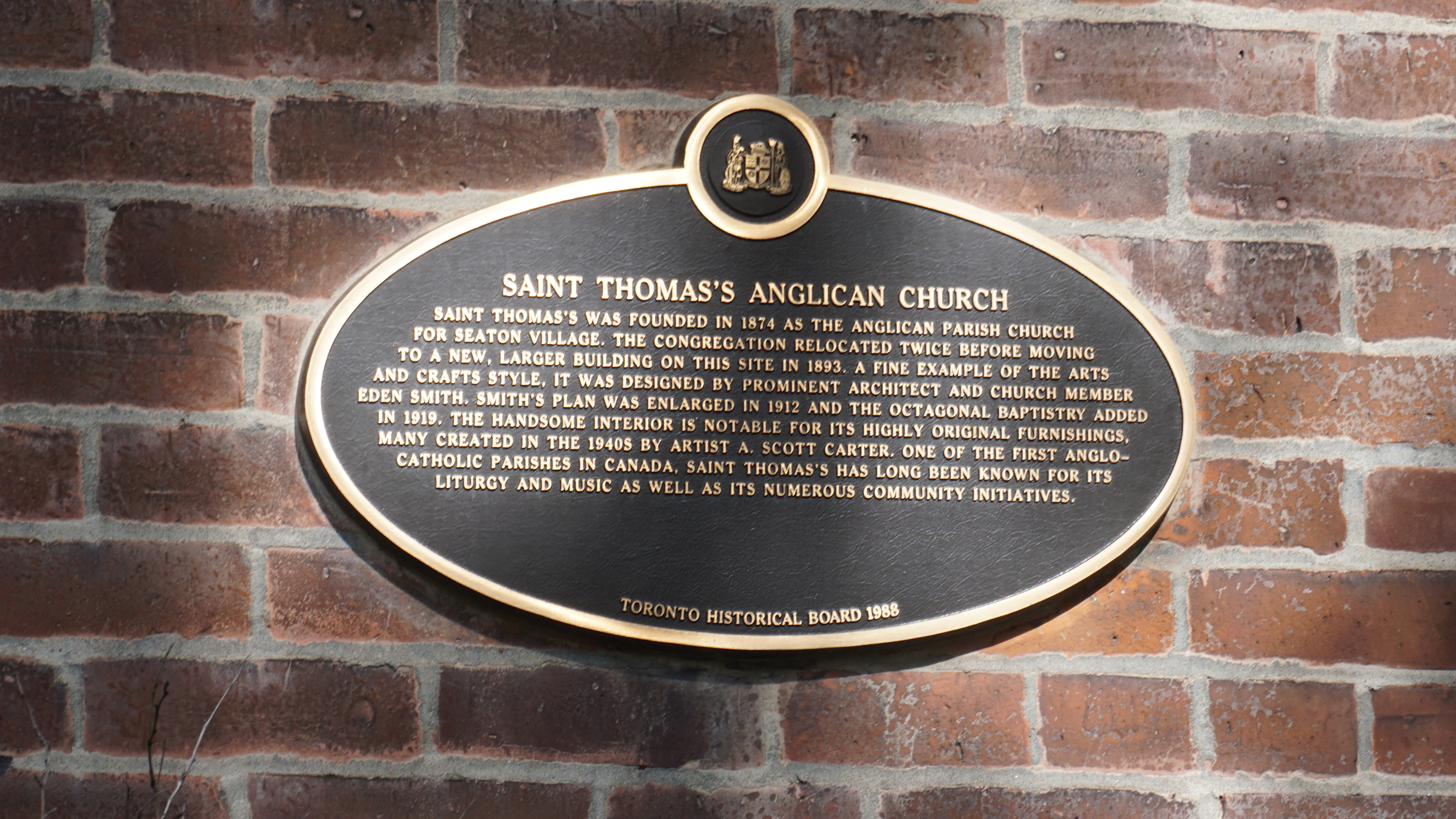
Historical plaque

== See also ==
- List of Anglican churches in Toronto
- Parkdale Deanery
