= St. Matthias, Bellwoods =

Coordinates: 43.647719°N 79.411154°W

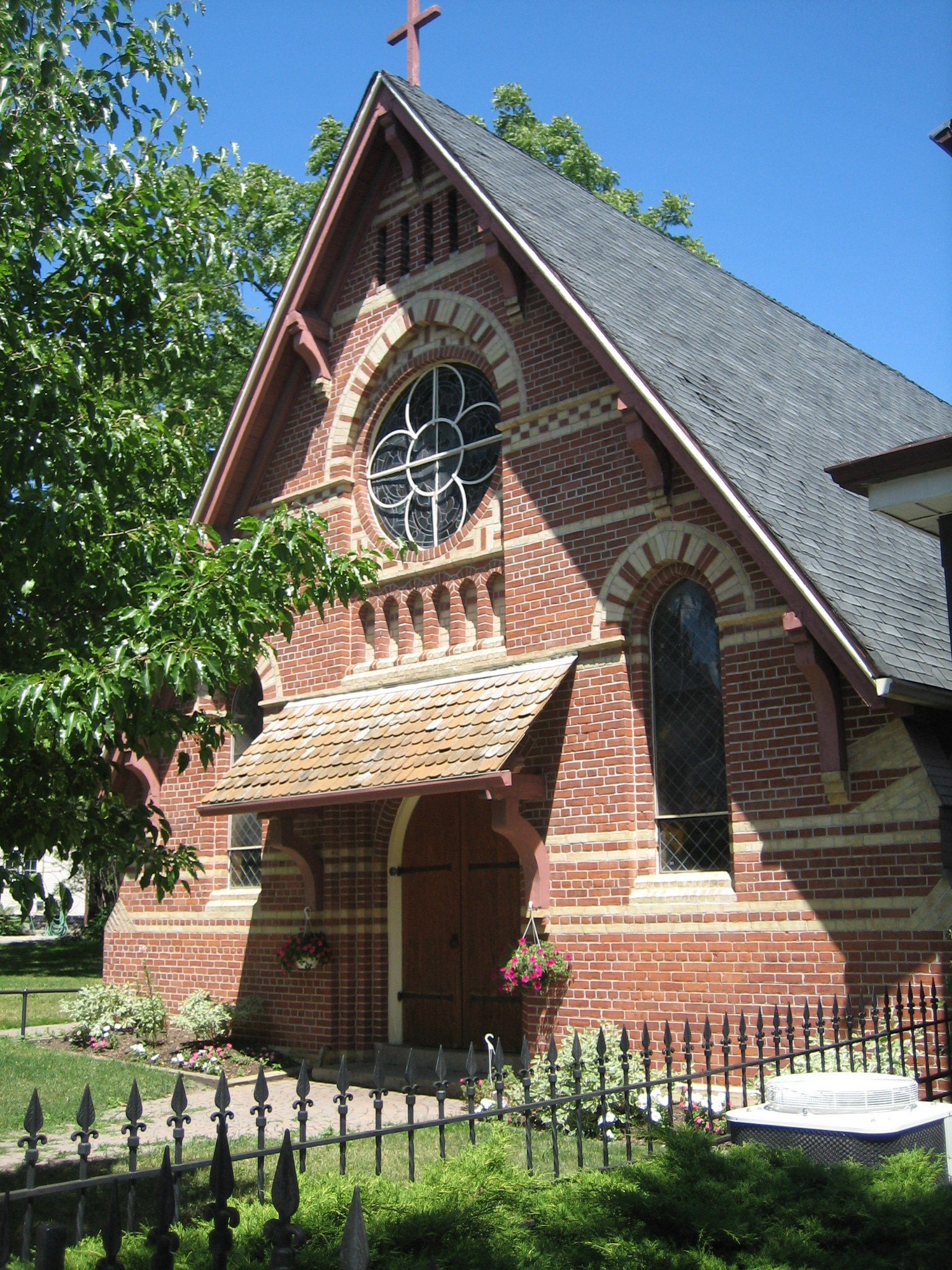
- St Matthias, Bellwoods
- St. Matthias, Bellwoods
- Location: Toronto, Ontario
- Country: Canada
- Denomination: Anglican
- Churchmanship: Modern Anglo-Catholic
- Website: www.saintmatthiasbellwoods.ca

History
- Dedication: Matthias the Apostle

Administration
- Province: Ontario
- Diocese: Toronto
- Archdeaconry: York-Credit Valley
- Deanery: Parkdale

Clergy
- Rector: not assigned

St. Matthias, Bellwoods is a small inclusive Anglo-Catholic parish of the Anglican Church of Canada located in Toronto, Ontario, Canada. The cornerstone was laid in 1873 and the building opened January 4, 1874. The parish is responsible for the Anglican chaplaincy at the Centre for Addiction and Mental Health.

The hymn tune "Bellwoods", sung in many countries to the text "O day of God draw nigh", by the Canadian biblical scholar R. B. Y. Scott, was written by James Hopkirk, a former organist at St. Matthias (and sometime organist of St. James' Cathedral (Toronto)) and named for the parish. Roland Ford Palmer, the author of the Marian hymn "Sing of Mary, pure and lowly", used in several denominations' hymnals in many countries, had a long association with St. Matthias's (before departing for the Anglican Catholic Church of Canada) and wrote a History of St Matthias' Church.

According to Palmer, St. Matthias was "the first Anglican church in Toronto to enjoy all these adjuncts to worship" i.e. the full complement of Anglo-Catholic ceremonial.

St. Matthias is also known to be the first Anglican parish to offer a formal Animal Blessing in Toronto. In more recent years, several other parishes have come to follow St. Matthias' lead in administering the annual ritual, welcoming animals of all kinds and their human companions for a liturgically-based blessing every autumn.

== See also ==
- List of Anglican churches in Toronto
- Parkdale Deanery
