= St. Anne's Anglican Church =

Historic church in Toronto, Ontario, Canada

Coordinates: 43.65060°N 79.430667°W

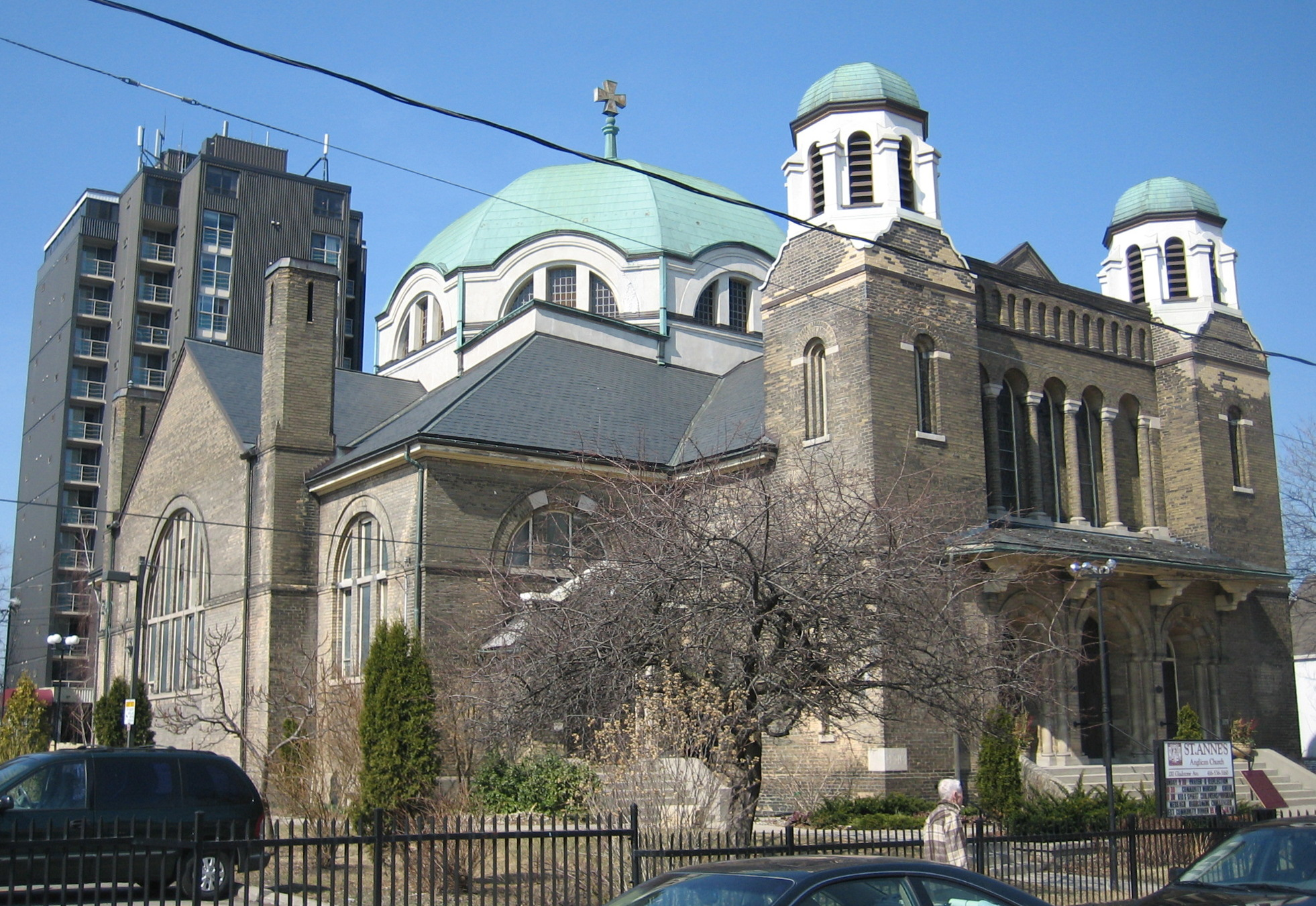
- Exterior of the church in 2009
- St. Anne's Anglican Church
- Denomination: Anglican Church of Canada
- Website: www.saintanne.ca

History
- Dedication: Saint Anne

Architecture
- Heritage designation: National Historic Site of Canada
- Designated: 1996
- Architect: William Ford Howland
- Style: Byzantine Revival
- Years built: 1907–1908

Administration
- Province: Ontario
- Diocese: Toronto
- Deanery: Parkdale
- Parish: St. Anne's, Brockton

Clergy
- Rector: The Rev. Don Beyers

St. Anne's Anglican Church (also known as St. Anne's, Gladstone Avenue, St. Anne's, Brockton, or the Group of Seven Church) was a historic Anglican parish church located in the Brockton Village neighbourhood of Toronto, Ontario.

Established in 1862, the building, a National Historic Site of Canada, was constructed in 1907–1908 in the Byzantine Revival style, unique for an Anglican church. The interior of the church was decorated with murals by members of the Group of Seven which dated to 1923 and Byzantine mosaics installed in the 1960s. The Group of Seven murals by J. E. H. MacDonald, Frederick Varley and Franklin Carmichael were a unique example of religious works by the circle, typically known for their landscapes.

The building, including its interior and artworks, was very largely destroyed by fire on Sunday, June 9, 2024. Immediate reactions included a declared intention to rebuild.

== History ==
The parish of St. Anne's was established in 1862 to serve the then-hamlet of Brockton, which was later annexed by Toronto in 1884. The first church building was built facing Dufferin Street on what is now the site of the parish hall, this building was expanded three times. The church is one of seven (formerly twelve) parishes that form the Parkdale Deanery.

By 1906, the parish had outgrown its building and its then rector, Canon Lawrence Skey, commissioned a new church. In 1907, a competition was held for designs for the new church. The competition was won by William Ford Howland, an associate at the firm of Burke & Horwood. The church was built in the Byzantine Revival style, unique for an Anglican church. St. Anne's is constructed of concrete and brick and has a cruciform plan with a distinctive central dome, 21 metres (69 ft) in height. Other architectural features include two domed bell towers, a half-domed chancel and arched transepts. It was the only Canadian Anglican church built in the Byzantine style. The property is protected by an Ontario Heritage Trust conservation easement. The property is also a designated building under the Ontario Heritage Act and it was designated as a National Historic Site by the Government of Canada in 1996.

=== Group of Seven ===
In 1923 Canon Lawrence Skey commissioned artwork for the interior; the project was led by J. E. H. MacDonald, one of the founding members of the Group of Seven. MacDonald assembled a group of Canadian artists, which included fellow Group of Seven members Frederick Varley and Franklin Carmichael, as well as Thoreau MacDonald, Neil Mackechnie, Arthur N. Martin, S. Treviranus, H. S. Palmer and H. S. Stansfield. Together they created more than a dozen murals and large paintings. The group also included sculptors Frances Loring and Florence Wyle, who created medallions and the reliefs of the four apostles.

=== Fire ===
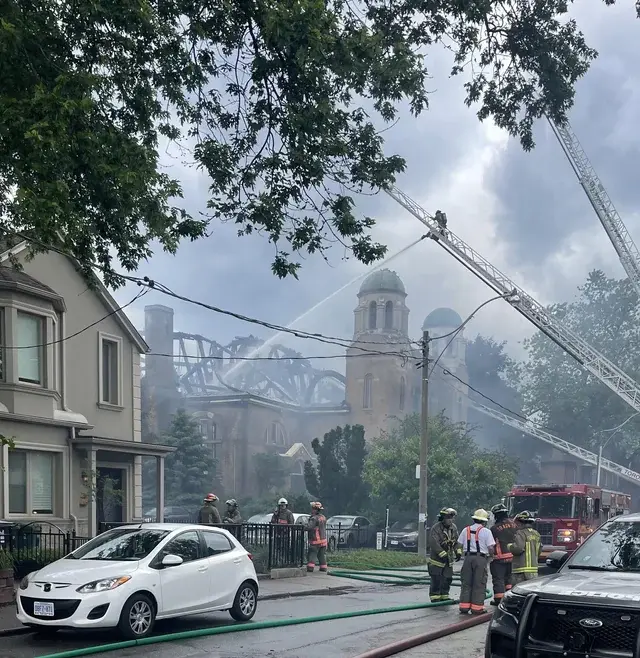
The church following the fire, June 9, 2024

On the morning of June 9, 2024, a fire broke out in the building at around 8:00 a.m. EDT. The four-alarm fire was knocked down by 9:30 a.m. The central dome of the church collapsed during the blaze, with no reports of injuries. The building and its artifacts were declared to have been "completely destroyed" by the fire.

Both the rector of the church, Don Beyers, and the mayor of Toronto, Olivia Chow, vowed to rebuild.

Initially, the fire was not thought to have been deliberately set, but in November 2025, Toronto Police stated that the blaze is now being treated as a suspected arson.

== Gallery ==
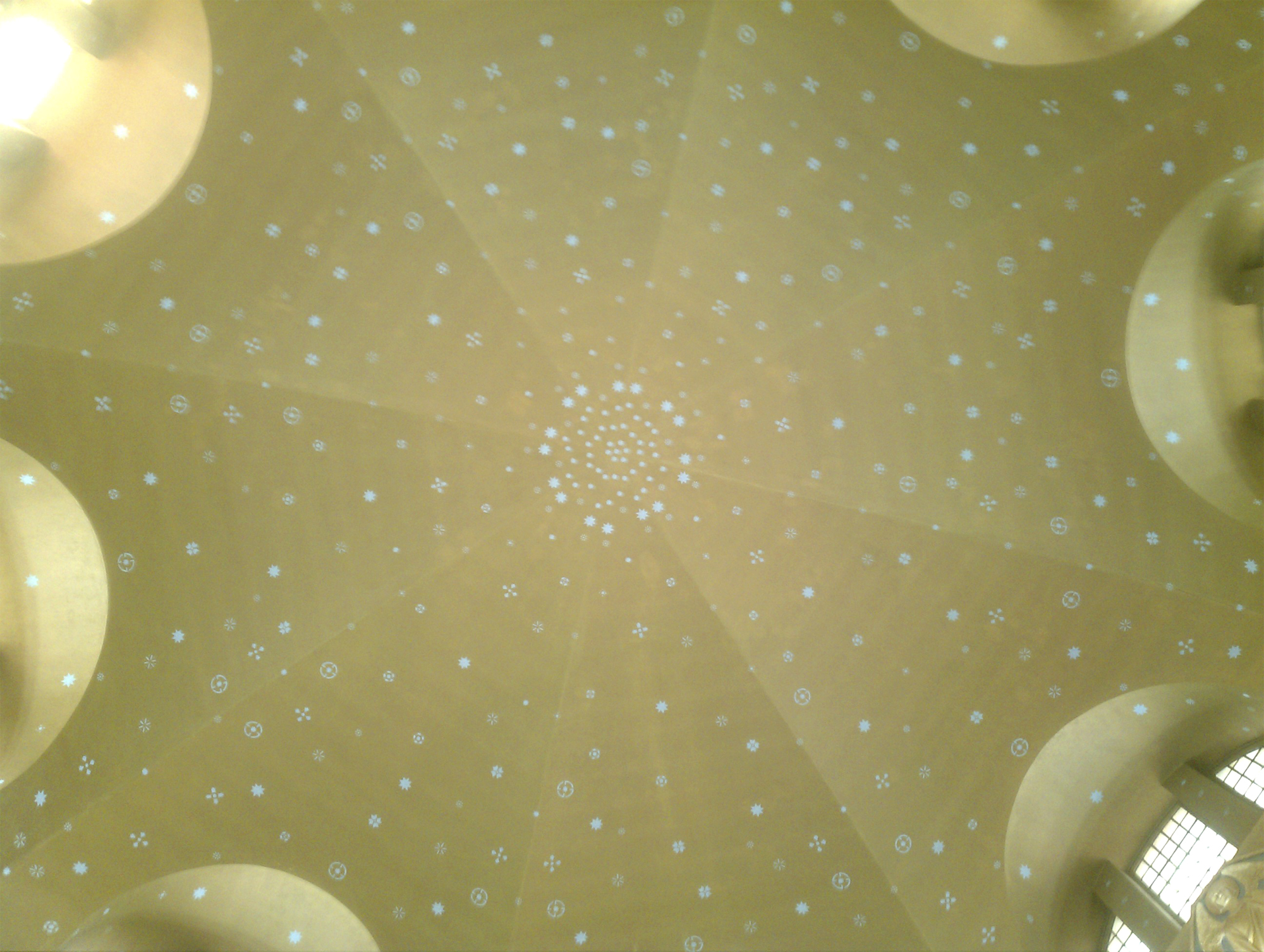
The painted Byzantine-style ceiling inside the dome

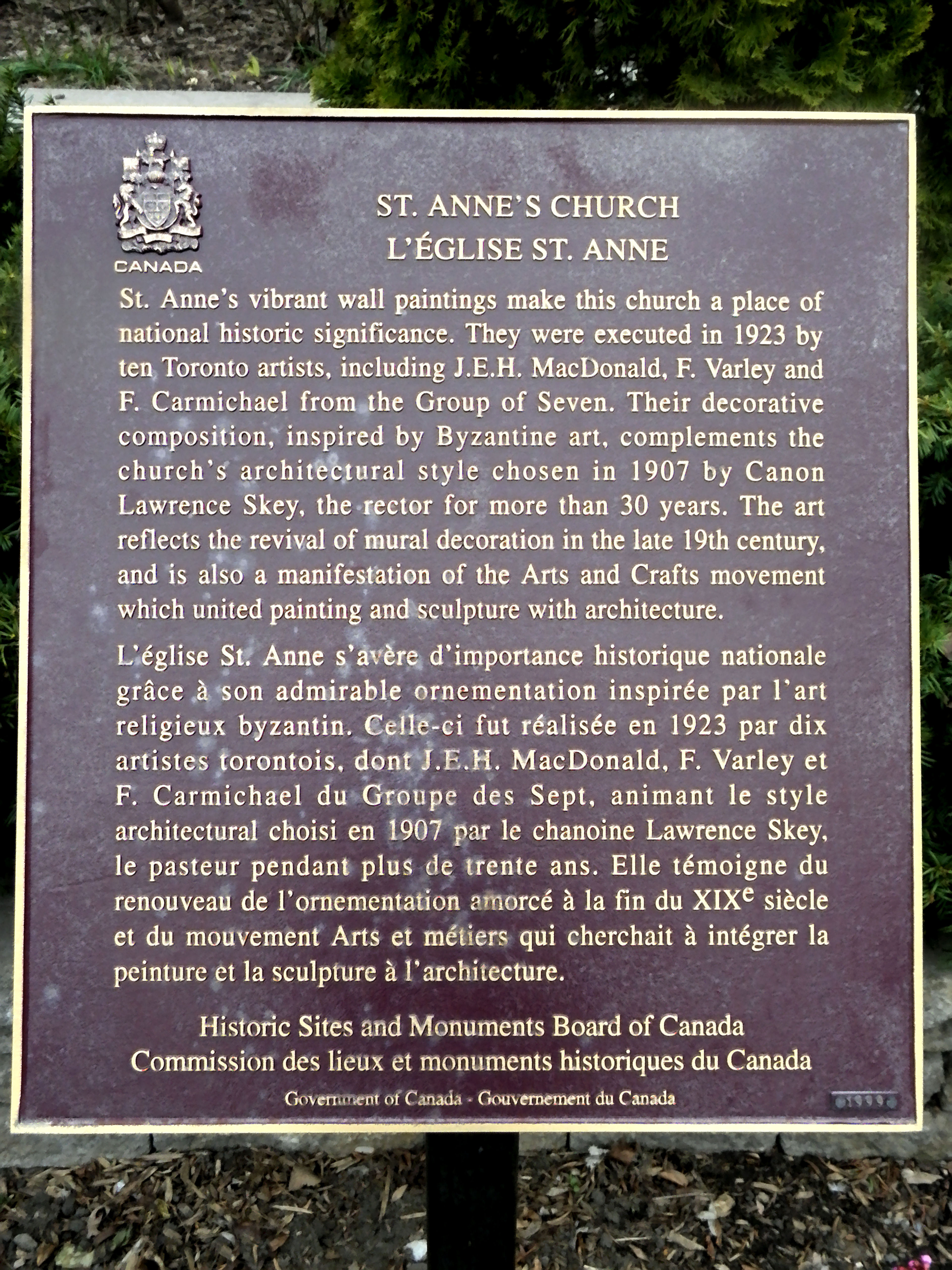
A plaque designated St. Anne's as a national historic site

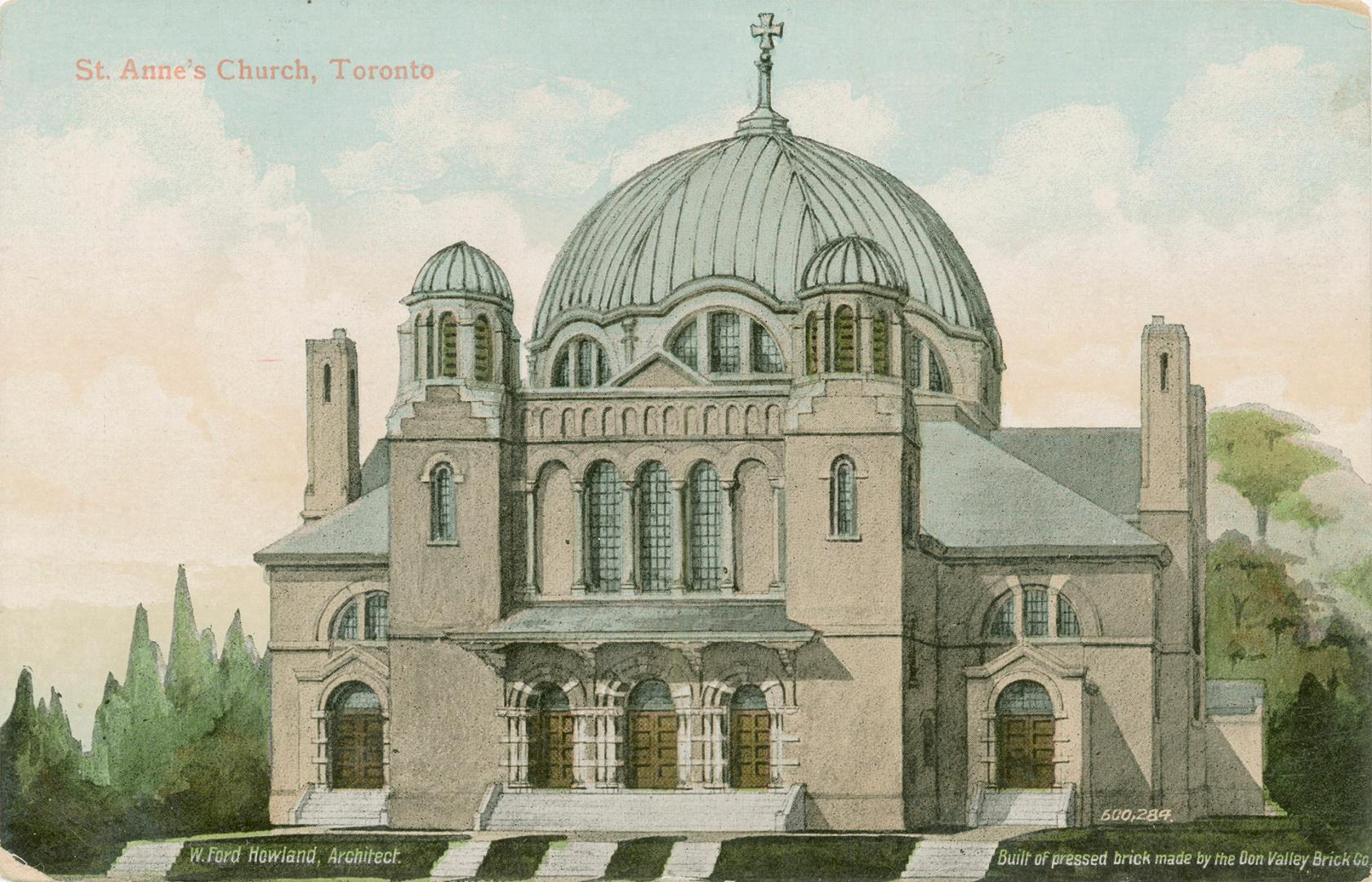
A 1909 postcard of St. Anne's
