= Elyse Goldstein =

Canadian Reform rabbi (born 1955)

Elyse Goldstein is a Canadian Reform rabbi. She is the first woman to be elected as president of the interdenominational Toronto Board of Rabbis and president of the Reform Rabbis of Greater Toronto.

== Early life and education ==
Goldstein was born in 1955 in Scranton, Pennsylvania, U.S. Goldstein's parents, Abraham (1914–1994) and Terry (Gallant, 1922–2014), were natives of greater New York City. Her father was a purchasing agent and her mother the director of a youth organization. As a student, Elyse Goldstein served at Beth Or, a synagogue for the deaf in New York City, and she remains committed to Jewish education for the deaf.

Goldstein was educated at Brandeis University (B.A. summa cum laude and Phi Beta Kappa) and graduated in 1978. She was ordained at Hebrew Union College-Jewish Institute of Religion in 1983.

== Career ==
Her first rabbinic positions were as assistant rabbi at Holy Blossom Temple in Toronto between 1983 and 1986. Goldstein has been described as the first female rabbi in Canada, but in fact, Joan Friedman was appointed as an assistant rabbi at Holy Blossom Temple in Toronto in 1980.

In 1985, Goldstein married Baruch Browns (changed to Browns-Sienna) (born 1956), a Jewish educator and graphic designer, and they have three children: Noam Ezra (born 1989), Yonah (born 1991), and Micah Benjamin (born 1994).

From 1986 to 1991, Goldstein served as rabbi of Temple Beth David of Canton, Massachusetts, before returning to Toronto.

In 1991, Goldstein founded Kolel: The Adult Centre for Liberal Jewish Learning in Toronto, an institute in the tradition of the Lehrhaus in Germany, offering Jewish studies to adults in classes, lectures, retreats, and in-depth seminars. It was the first such institution under Reform Jewish auspices in Canada and one of only a handful in North America. Housed in its own building and serving an increasing number of singles and unaffiliated Jews as well as established members of the community, Kolel became a significant and singular presence on the Jewish educational scene of Toronto. In 2011, Goldstein retired from Kolel to found a new Reform synagogue in downtown Toronto, City Shul. After 13 years, she retired from City Shul and is now Rabbi Emerita at City Shul.

Goldstein served on the Editorial Advisory Board of the Canadian Jewish News and Mazon: A Jewish Response to Hunger.

== Writings ==
Goldstein is the author of four books published by Jewish Lights Publishing:

- ReVisions: Seeing Torah through a Feminist Lens (1998)
- The Women’s Torah Commentary (2000)
- The Women’s Haftarah Commentary (2003)
- New Jewish Feminism: Probing the Past, Forging the Future (2004)

For several years she wrote a monthly column for the Canadian Jewish News. Her articles have appeared in The Journal of Canadian Women's Studies, The Journal of Reform Judaism and other periodicals.

She is one of seven women featured in the Francine Zuckerman documentary Half the Kingdom.

In addition to her book publications she is also the author of several journal articles and newspaper articles, including:

- Jewish Feminism and "New" Jewish Rituals (1996)
- Judaism's View of Women (Winter 1983)
- The Women Were Right (2011)
- Removing the Veils (2011) with Noam Sienna

== Awards ==
In 1996, the YWCA of Metropolitan Toronto presented her with the Woman of Distinction Award for excellence in the field of education. Her book ReVisions: Seeing Torah Through a Feminist Lens won the Canadian Jewish Book Award in the field of Bible 1998. She was named ORT "Woman of the Year" in 2001. Elyse Goldstein received the 2004 UJA Rabbinic Achievement Award. She is the 2005 recipient of the most prestigious award in Jewish education, the internationally recognized Covenant Award for Exceptional Jewish Educators. In May 2008 she received an honorary Doctor of Divinity degree from Hebrew Union College.

== Sources ==
- Joseph, Norma Baumel (2004). Jewish Women in Canada: An Evolving Role.
- Bibliography in Jewish Virtual Library
- Bibliography in Jewish Women's Archive
