= Parkdale-Toronto West Deanery =

Church in Canada

Parkdale-Toronto West Deanery Toronto, Canada.
- Denomination: Anglican

History
- Dedication: Epiphany, St. Mark, St. Anne, St. George, St. Mary Magdalene, St. Matthias, St. Stephen and St. Thomas

Administration
- Province: Canada
- Diocese: Ontario
- Parish: Ontario

The Parkdale-Toronto West Deanery in the Anglican Diocese of Toronto is a group of 17 Anglican parishes and chapels in downtown Toronto, Canada. They include the churches of St. Anne's, Epiphany and St. Mark, Parkdale, St. George by the Grange, St. Mary Magdalene, St. Matthias Bellwoods, St. Stephen-in-the-Fields, and St. Thomas's Anglican Church (Toronto). After years of slow decline in church attendance, the Deanery has engaged in a process to revise the way churches are managed in this part of the Diocese.

Congregation	Location	Dates	Notes	Image
Epiphany and St. Mark, Parkdale	Parkdale	1877	Formed by the amalgamation of the Church of the Epiphany (1887) and the Church of St. Mark, Parkdale (1877) in 1983	
St. Anne Anglican Church	Dufferin Grove		Anglican Diocese of Toronto Toronto architect Ford Howland designed St. Anne's Church in the Byzantine style with interior decoration includes wall and ceiling paintings executed by members of the Group of Seven.	
St. George by the Grange Anglican Church	Grange Park	1853	Anglican Diocese of Toronto Formerly St. George the Martyr	
St. Mary Magdalene Anglican Church	Downtown	Founded 1888	Anglo-Catholic Anglican Diocese of Toronto	
St. Matthias Bellwoods	Trinity-Bellwoods	Founded 1873. Architect Frank Darling designed the building, opened for worship on 4 January 1874, and the baptismal font (donated by W. C. Mollington, 1886).	Anglo-Catholic Anglican Diocese of Toronto	
St. Stephen-in-the-Fields Anglican Church	Kensington Market	Founded 1858	Designed by Thomas Fuller (architect) and Henry Langley in a Gothic Revival design. The church derived its name from its original rural setting. Restored by Henry Langley (architect), 1865–66	
St. Thomas's, Huron Street Anglican Church	Downtown	Founded 1874	Anglo-Catholic Anglican Diocese of Toronto	
