= Epiphany and St. Mark, Parkdale =

Coordinates: 43.6407°N 79.4325°W

Church of the Epiphany and St. Mark
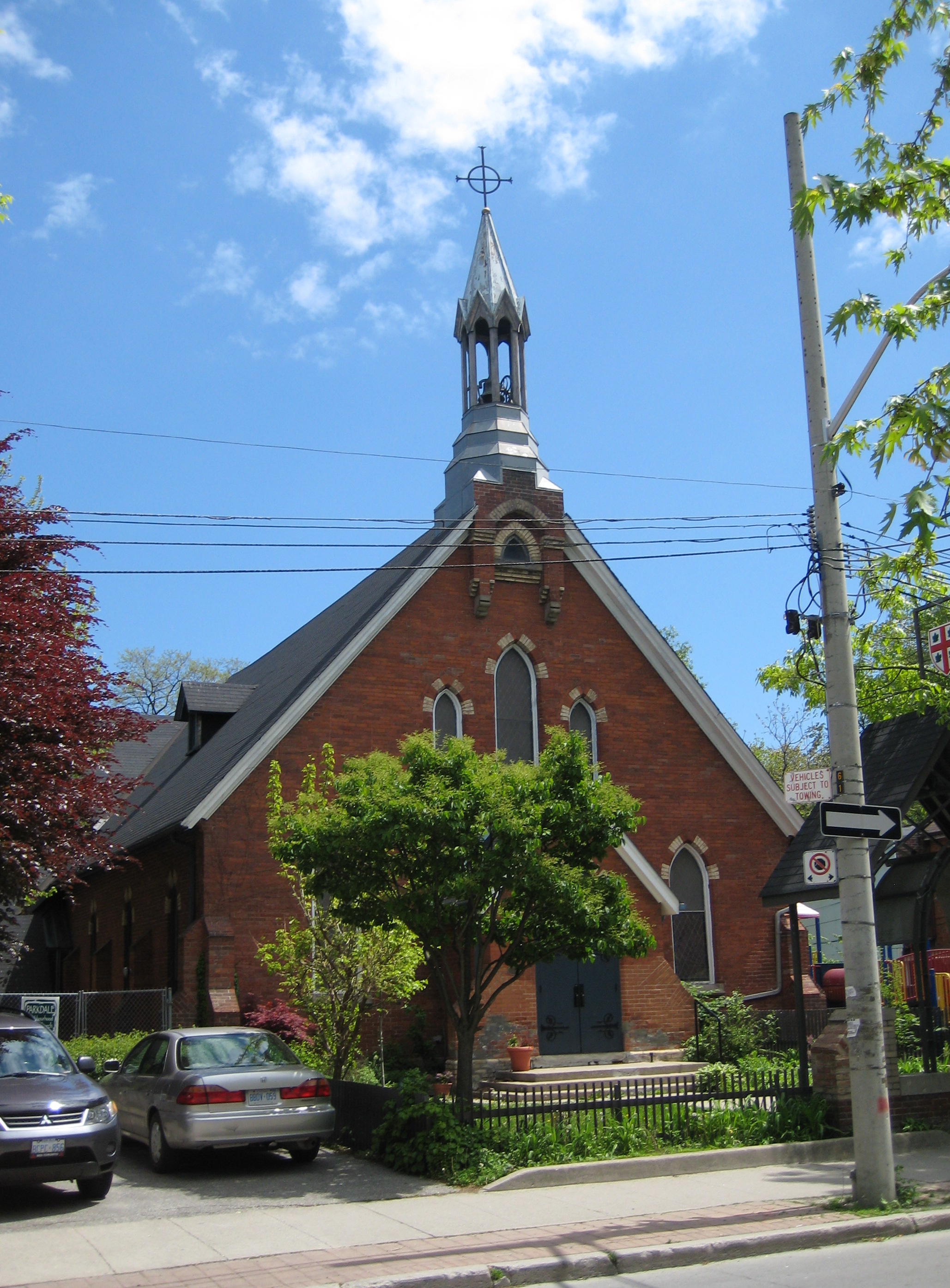
- Church of the Epiphany and St. Mark, Parkdale
- Church of the Epiphany and St. Mark
- Location: Parkdale, Toronto, Ontario
- Country: Canada
- Denomination: Anglican
- Website: http://www.epiphanyandstmark.ca

History
- Former name(s): Church of the Epiphany (1887-1983) and Church of St. Mark, Parkdale (1876–1983)
- Founded: July 1, 1876
- Consecrated: December 16, 1877

Architecture
- Architect: Langley, Langley, and Burke
- Style: Gothic revival
- Groundbreaking: October 11, 1880
- Completed: January 20, 1881

Specifications
- Capacity: about 240

Administration
- Province: Ontario
- Diocese: Toronto
- Deanery: Parkdale

The Church of the Epiphany and St. Mark, Parkdale, is a small inclusive parish of the Anglican Church of Canada located in the Parkdale area of Toronto, Ontario. The church was founded upon the 1983 amalgamation of The Church of the Epiphany and The Church of St. Mark, Parkdale.

== History: The Church of St. Mark, Parkdale ==
St. Mark, Parkdale was set apart as an independent parish on July 1, 1876. Prior to this the area had been part of St. Anne's parish. The first services were held on December 16, 1877 in a small frame building built on the church's present site on Cowan Avenue, below Queen Street. The lot cost $900 and the 25 ft x 15 ft building cost a further $600. The cornerstone of the current building was laid by the Bishop of Toronto on October 11, 1880. The church was opened and dedicated on January 20, 1881. As a result of significant population growth in Parkdale in the 1880s, the church grew from 40 families in 1880 to 320 in 1887 and the need for another parish was recognized.

== The Church of the Epiphany ==
Construction of the Church of the Epiphany took place at the corner of Queen Street and Beaty Avenue in 1887 and the first services were held on November 18 of that year. This building is still present south of the newer sanctuary building which was erected and opened on March 31, 1911. The Church of the Epiphany had a close association with Wycliffe College. Its founding rector, Rev. Bernard Bryan, had been one of the nine men who constituted the first class at Wycliffe in 1877. This connection continued when in 1959 the Church of the Epiphany's rector, the Rev. Leslie Hunt, was appointed Principal of Wycliffe College. This connection gave the Church of the Epiphany an evangelical orientation.

== Amalgamation ==
As a result of shifting demographics in Parkdale, the Executive committee of the Diocese of Toronto confirmed the amalgamation of the parishes and congregations of the Church of the Epiphany and the Church of St. Mark, Parkdale on January 27, 1983. On February 8 of that year, the amalgamated vestry voted to locate at the Church of St. Mark, Parkdale and to accept an offer from the Maronite Church to purchase the Church of the Epiphany's buildings. This church is now known as Our Lady of Lebanon.

== See also ==
- List of Anglican churches in Toronto
- Parkdale Deanery
