= St. George by the Grange Anglican Church =

St. George's Grange Park (Anglican Church)
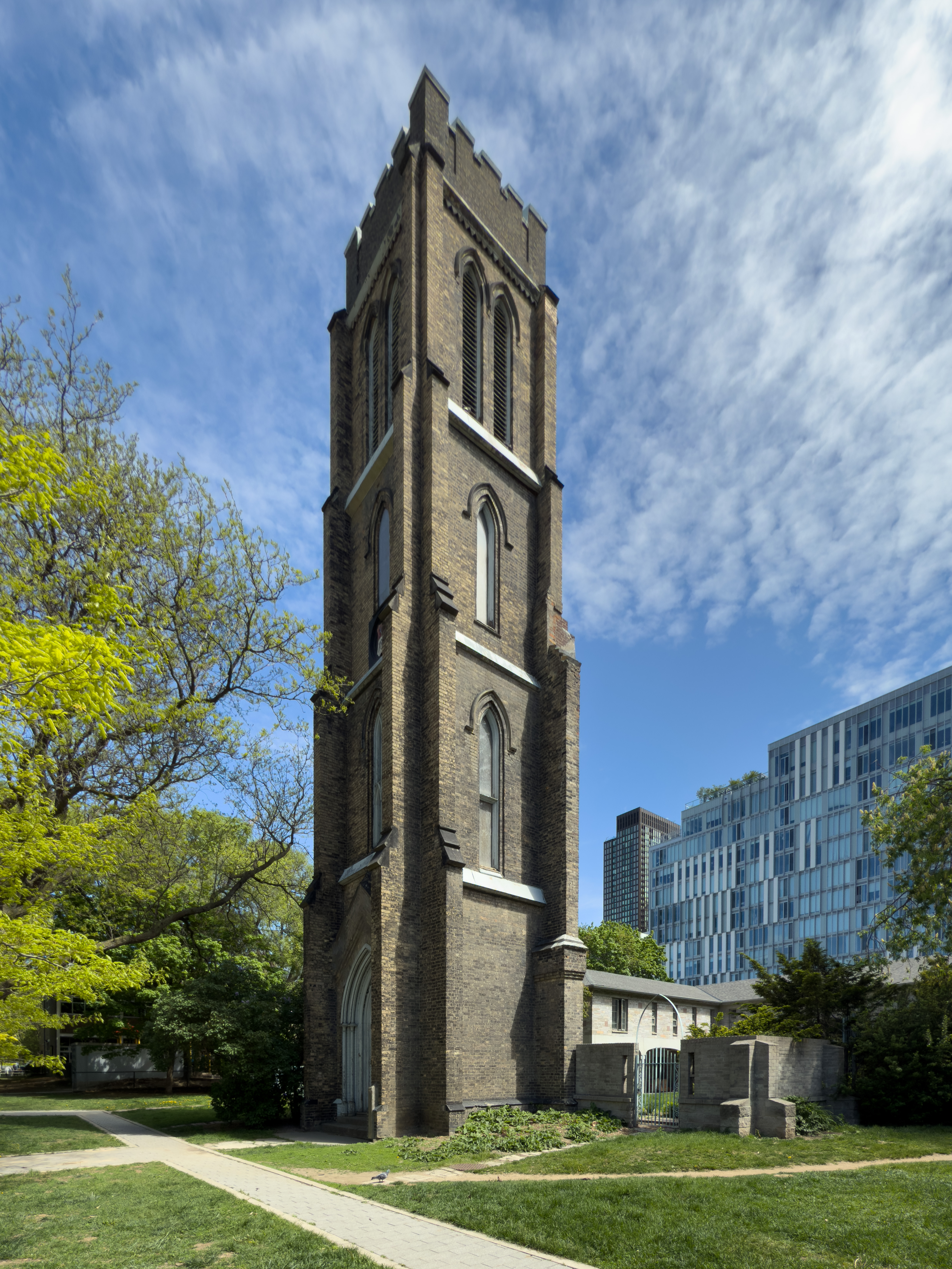
- St. George's Grange Park (Anglican Church)
- 43.65145°N 79.3935761°W
- Location: 30 Stephanie Street; Toronto, Ontario
- Denomination: Anglican Church of Canada
- Website: www.sggp.church

History
- Former name: St. George the Martyr Anglican Church
- Founded: 1844
- Dedication: St. George

Architecture
- Heritage designation: City of Toronto Heritage Property By-Law 663-80 August 18, 1980
- Architect(s): Henry Bowyer Lane; Kivas Tully
- Style: Gothic Revival
- Years built: 1845 (tower); 1857 (church); 1957 (current church)
- Groundbreaking: 1844

Administration
- Province: Ontario
- Diocese: Toronto
- Deanery: Parkdale

Clergy
- Rector: The Rt Rev. Jenny Andison
- Vicar: The Rev. Dr. Tyler Wigg-Stevenson

St. George's Grange Park, formerly known as the Church of Saint George the Martyr, is an Anglican Church of Canada church in the Grange Park neighbourhood of Toronto, Ontario. The church re-opened for public worship in September 2024 after a period of "sabbath rest".

The present church building is located in the original parish hall which was constructed in 1857. It became the place of worship after the church, built in 1845, was destroyed by fire in 1955. The bell tower is all that remains of the original church building. The courtyard garden serves as a memorial to where the original church once stood.

== History ==
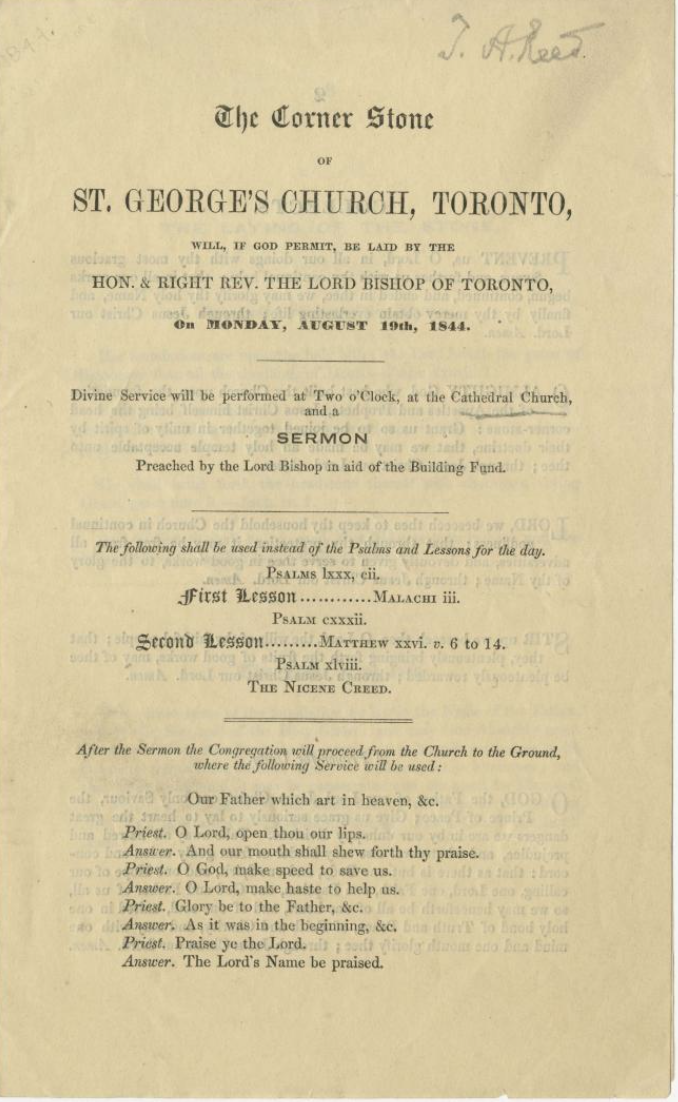
The Corner stone of St. George's Church, Toronto, will, if God permit, be laid by the Hon. & Right Rev. the Lord Bishop of Toronto, on Monday, August 19, 1844

The cornerstone of the church was laid on Monday, August 19, 1844 by Bishop John Strachan and the church opened as St. George the Martyr Anglican Church on November 9, 1845. The original church was located at 205 John Street, on land donated by the Boulton family (who lived in The Grange). It was the third Anglican parish in the city, after St. James Cathedral and Little Trinity. The Gothic Revival style church with 150-foot spire was designed by Henry Bowyer Lane and the bricks were built from clay from Ramsden Park. The parish hall (now the church's place of worship) was constructed in 1857 by Kivas Tully and the rectory (now artist studios) was constructed in 1865 by Gundry & Langley.

Around the turn of the 20th century, the demographics of downtown changed, affecting Anglican churches in the area. The parish merged with nearby St. Margaret's, Spadina, in 1909 but continued to worship at St. George's.

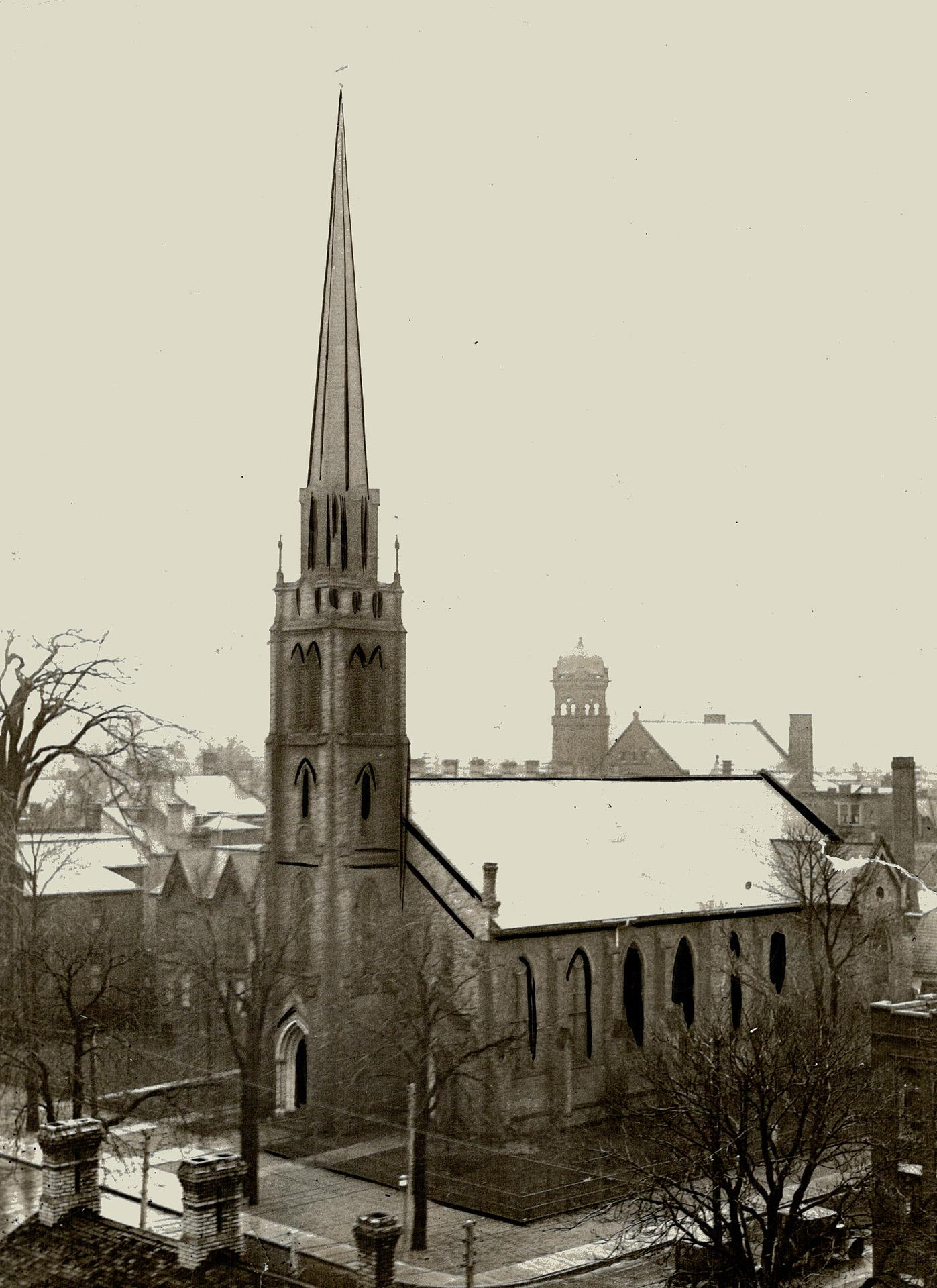
Original Church of St. George the Martyr in 1925

The church was destroyed by fire on February 13, 1955. Only the tower remains. The cost of a new church was deemed too expensive, thus, the congregation worshipped in the rectory until, in 1957, when the parish hall had been converted into a new place of worship. The footprint of the former church is now a garden. In 1985, a two-story cloister was built encircling the former nave.

In 2017, the church came under the pastoral care of nearby St. Paul's, Bloor Street. From 2018, and for the duration of its closure, the church changed its name to St. George by the Grange. A new congregation planted by St. Paul's began worshipping at the church in September 2024 under the new name of St. George's Grange Park.

== Stained Glass Windows ==
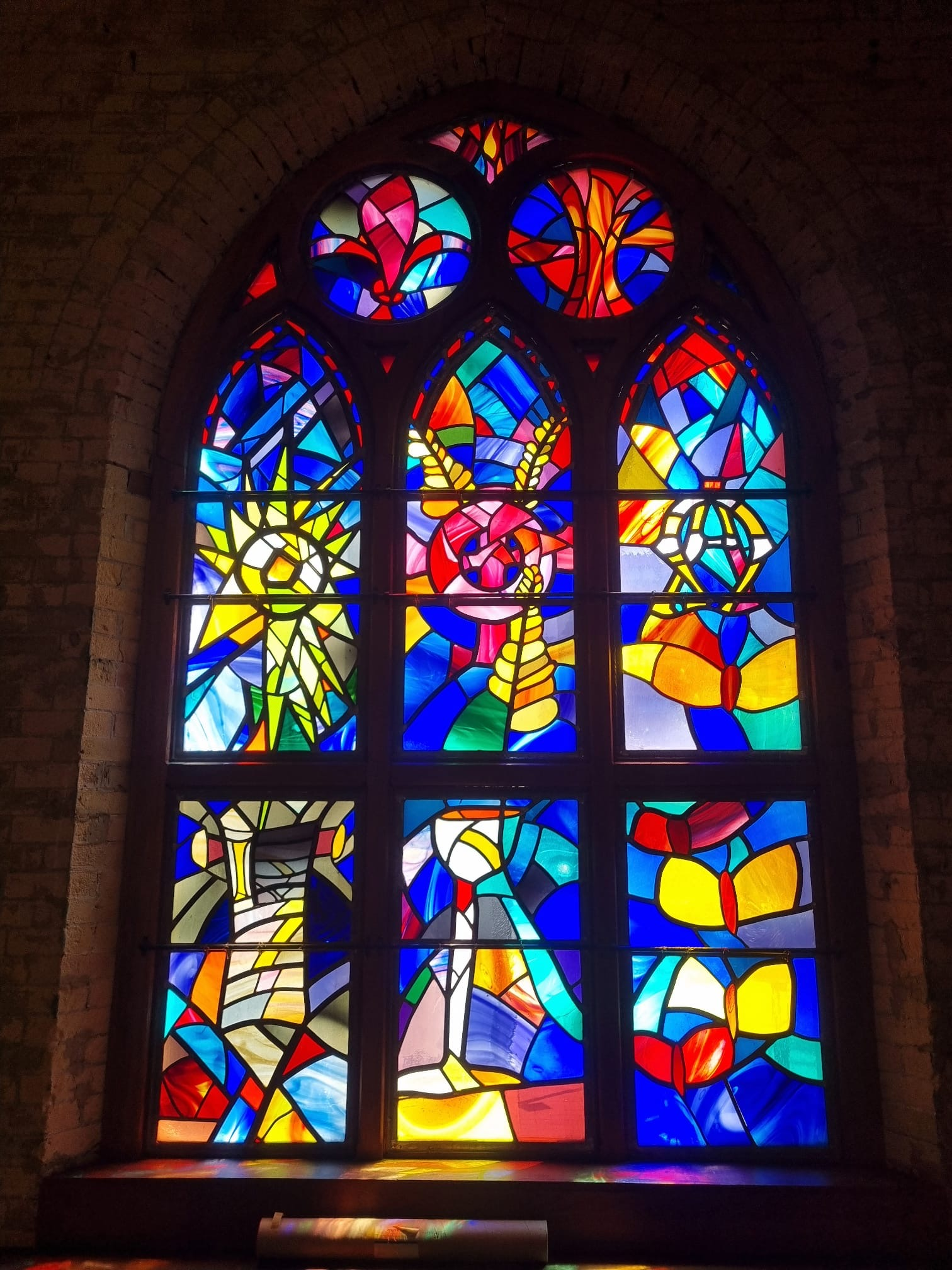
Stained Glass Window behind altar by Angus MacDonald, 1986

The inside of the present church is decorated with modern stained glass which can be seen behind the altar, at the back of the church, and adorning the doors.

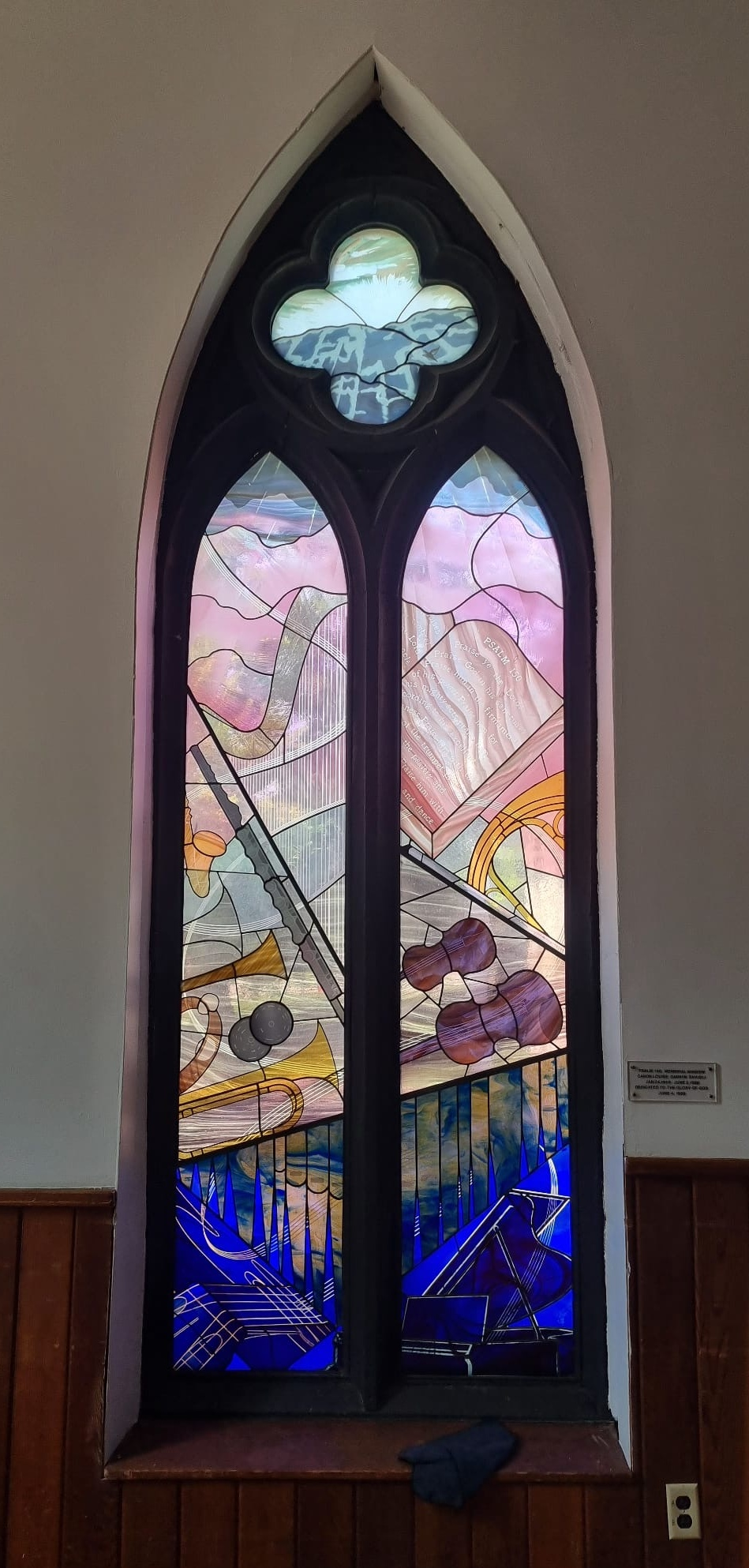
Stained Glass Window by Roz Sokolosky

The gothic shaped window behind the altar was designed and created by parishioner Albert Angus MacDonald. Completed shortly before his death in 1986, the subject of the window is inspired by Revelation 4. On the left pane of the second row of the window, the shining star proclaims the birth of Jesus. In middle pane, the blood of the cross, depicted in red, represents that Jesus’ death on the cross releases the eternally accessible forgiveness and healing for the returning penitent. The Alpha-Omega symbol on the right pane represents his Resurrection and Presence for all those to discover and embrace. The scroll on the bottom left pane depicts God’s heart and will revealed to us through his Word and scripture. The font and chalice in middle pane represent the sacraments of Baptism and Communion. And, finally the butterfly in the bottom right represents the Holy Spirit transforming our lives. The memorial window at the West end of the church is a visual representation of Psalm 150, made by Roz Sokolosky.

=== Connection to Arts Community ===
The church is located in Grange Park, close by to the Art Gallery of Ontario and OCAD University. In 2019 the rectory was converted into artist studios, which open their doors to the public twice a year.

Prominent Canadian artist Joyce Wieland's funeral was held at the church on July 8, 1998. Her ashes are interred in the memorial garden. The church was chosen for her funeral and resting place because of its close proximity to the Art Gallery of Ontario, where she had close ties with the staff and, in 1987, was the first living female artist to have a solo exhibition at the Gallery.

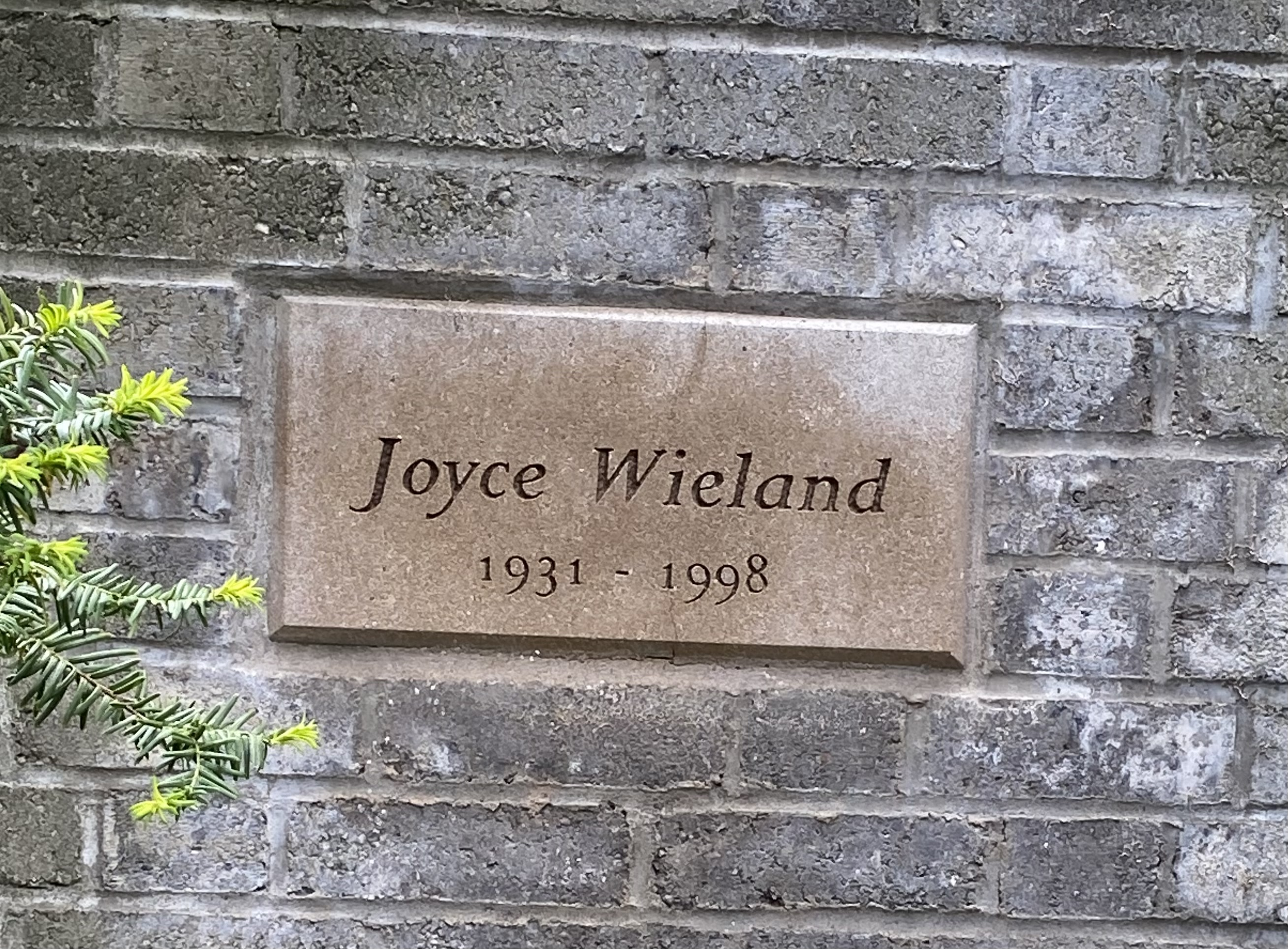
Joyce Wieland Memorial

== Past Rectors ==
- 1844 - 48: Rev. Charles Ruttan
- 1848 - 62: Rev. Stephen Lett
- 1862 - 75: Rev. Thomas B. Fuller
- 1875 - 1911: Rev. Canon John D’Arcy Cayley
- 1911 - 28: Rev. Canon R.J. Moore
- 1926 - 36: Rev. P.J. Dykes
- 1936 - 40: Rev. W.L. Wright
- 1940 - 49: Rev. R.P. Walker
- 1949 - 55: Rev. G.P. Parson
- 1955 – 96: Rev. Canon William Riesberry
- 1998? - 2010: Rev. Max Woolaver
- 2010 - 16: Rev. Canon Simon Bell

== Gallery ==
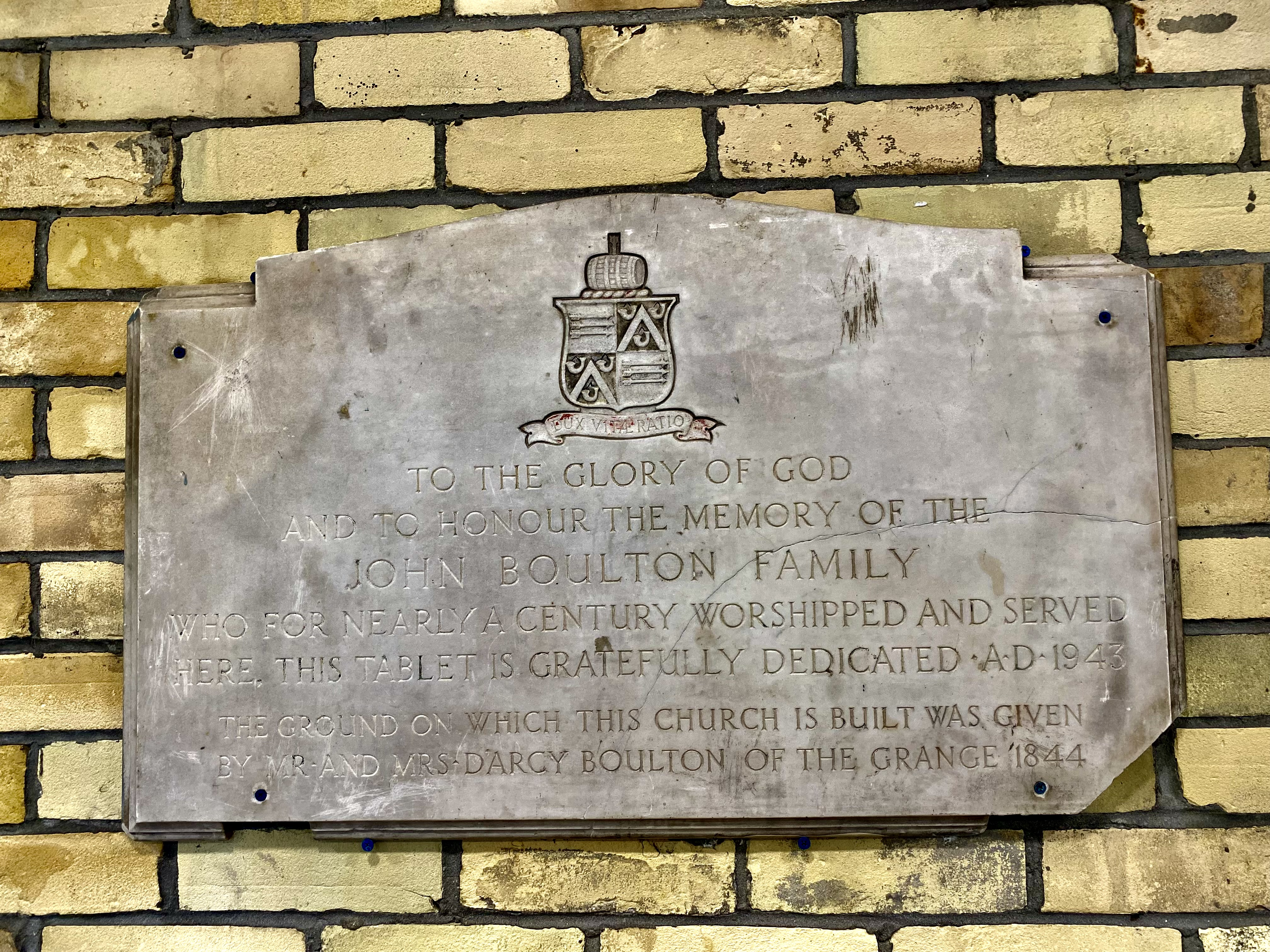

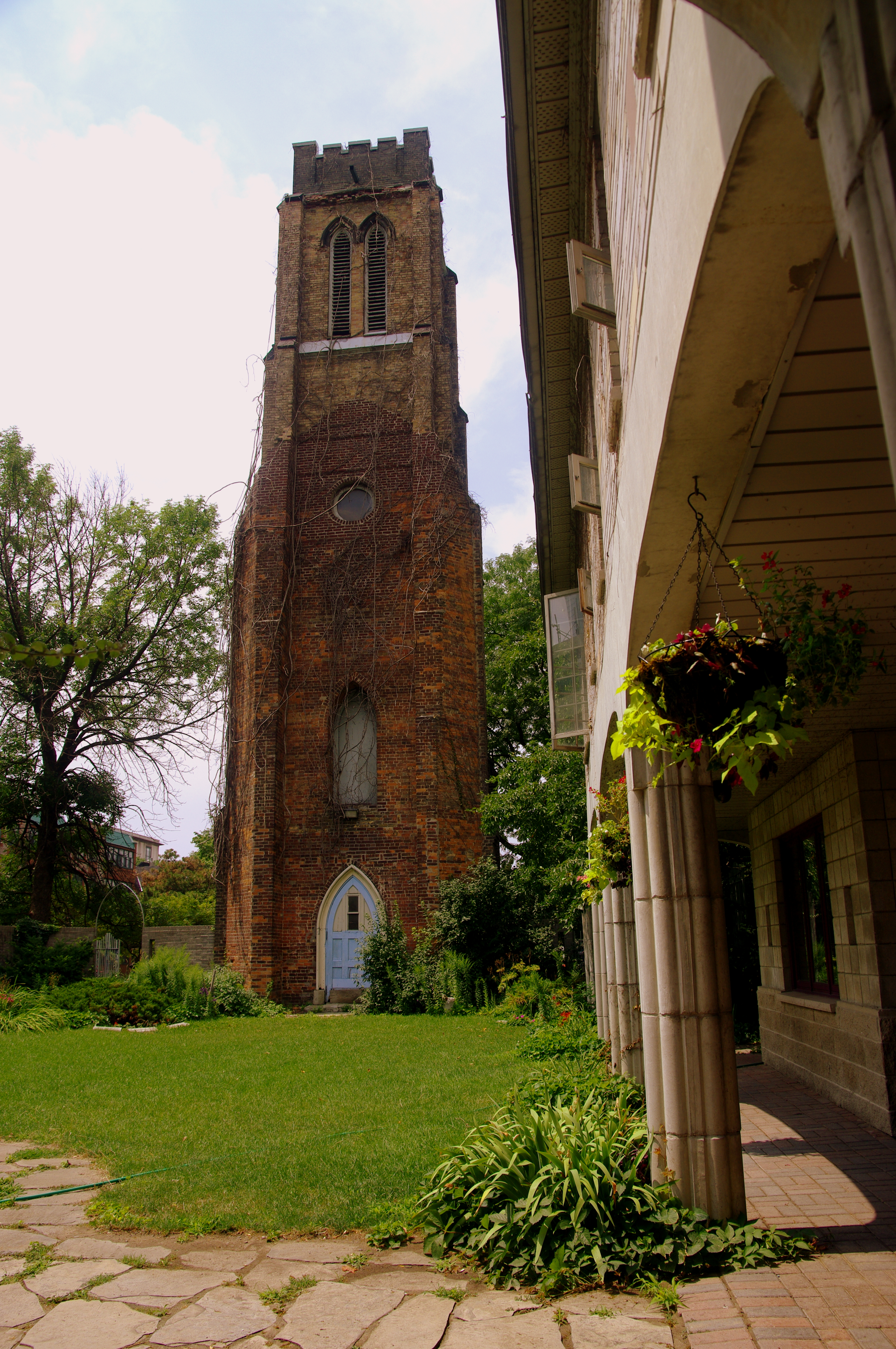

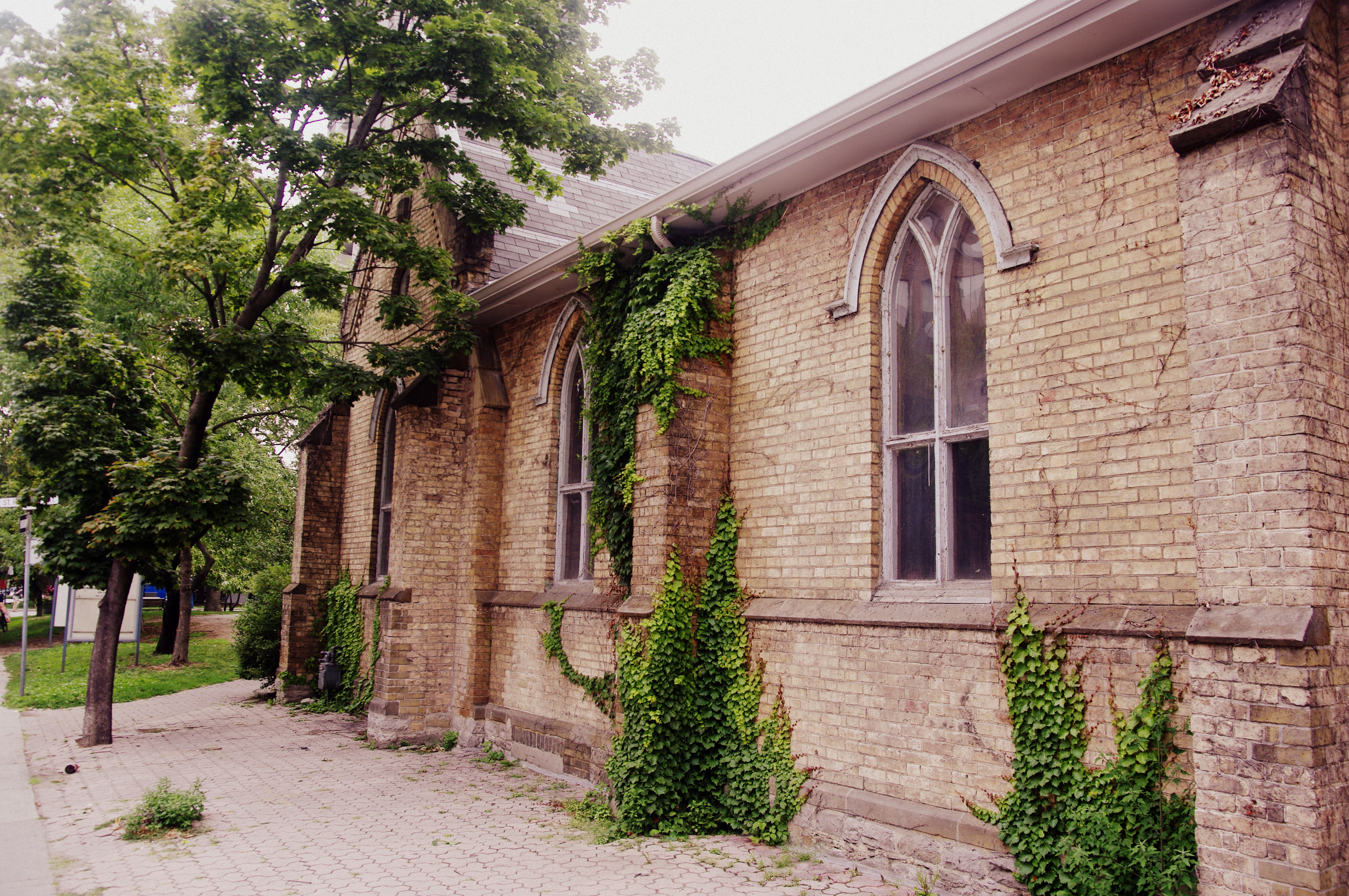

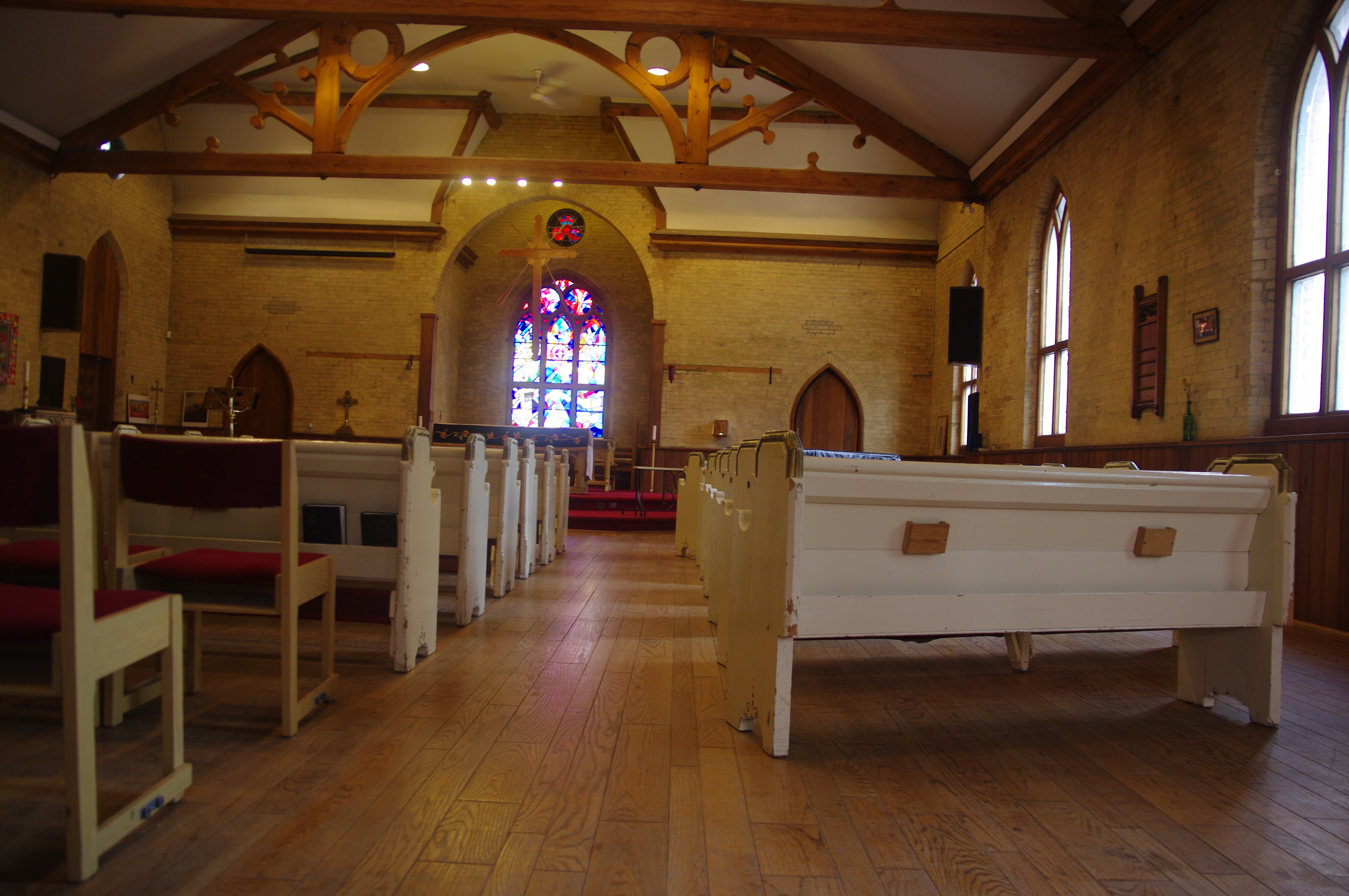

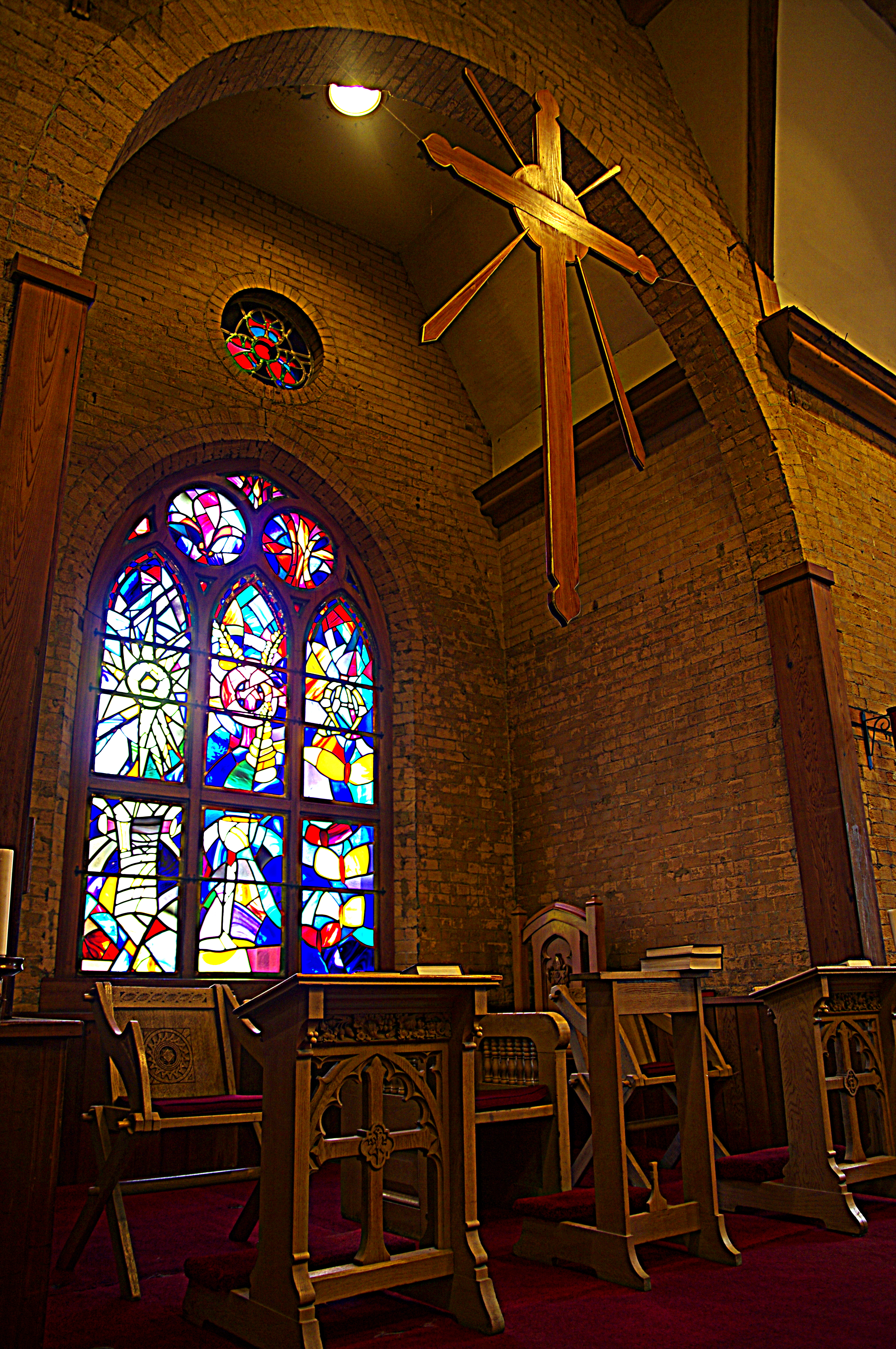

== See also ==
- List of Anglican churches in Toronto
- Parkdale Deanery
