= Architecture of Upper Canada College =

Since its founding in 1829, Upper Canada College (UCC), in Toronto, Ontario, Canada, has occupied a number of sites and various structures on those sites. The school campus has always held a relatively prominent place within the city.

== 1829 to 1891 ==
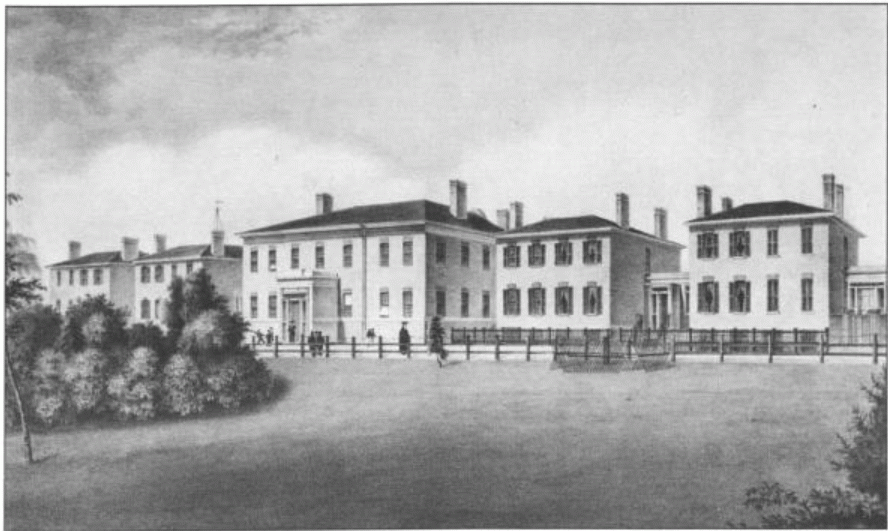
Upper Canada College in 1835

The College was founded in 1829 by then-Lieutenant Governor of Upper Canada, Major-General Sir John Colborne (later Lord Seaton). Originally, the College was situated in the Royal Grammar School (known as the Old Blue School) at College Square – 6 acres (24,000 m^{2}) bounded by Church, Adelaide, Jarvis and Richmond streets. This was a simple two-storey, wood-frame building with clapboard siding, six-over-six paned windows and a pitched roof. John Strachan had it painted blue and white, which remain UCC's colours to this day.

However, this was a temporary location, and the Board of Education of Upper Canada had been planning on a more permanent locale since before the school opened its doors. Initially they eyed Peter Street near the then-end of King Street, but Colborne desired it to be at Russell Square, between King, Simcoe, Adelaide and John Streets. Colborne's location was accepted, and tenders for construction of the new College buildings were put out in May 1830. The cost of the buildings was originally slated at £10,000, but the cost was eventually estimated to be double that amount.

In Lost Toronto, William Dendy wrote:

"All the UCC buildings were of red brick. Only the main block had much architectural pretension, with its large porch supported on stone piers and the windows ornamented with flat, ledge-like architraves supported on scrolled consoles.... The centre block measured 80 feet (24 m) wide and 82 feet (25 m) deep and contained offices and classrooms opening off a central hall on both floors; in the northwest corner of the second floor there was a "prayer room", with a dais for the master and box pews for each of the seven forms...."

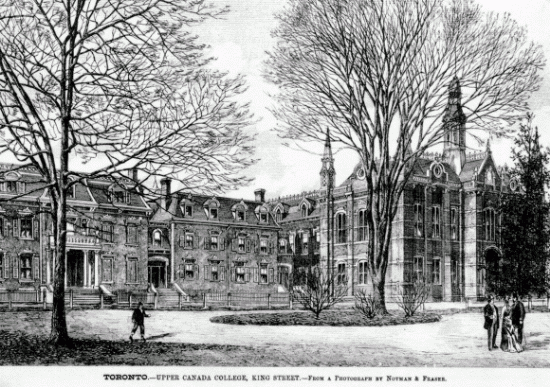
View of the campus at King and Simcoe Streets in 1879

By the 1870s, with an enrolment of 300, the school was outgrowing the 1831 buildings. A $40,000 expenditure for expansion of the original structures was approved by the province for twelve classrooms, a public hall, a room for the principal, and beds for 60 more borders. The improvements were complete by April 1877, with the centre block expanded and its main facade altered to more of a Queen Anne style blended with a modified Elizabethan. Two story brick piers enhanced the corners and framed tall narrow windows, with the main entrance protruding forward, flanked by banded columns, more typical of Jacobean style. An octagonal cupola surmounted the main entrance volume, surrounded by narrow pinnacles topping the corner piers, which all concealed chimneys and ventilation openings. The eclectic mix of different styles was typical of the overall concept of Victorian architecture. By 1880, the College already again needed expansion of the boarding houses, and a gymnasium was necessary.

== 1891 to present ==
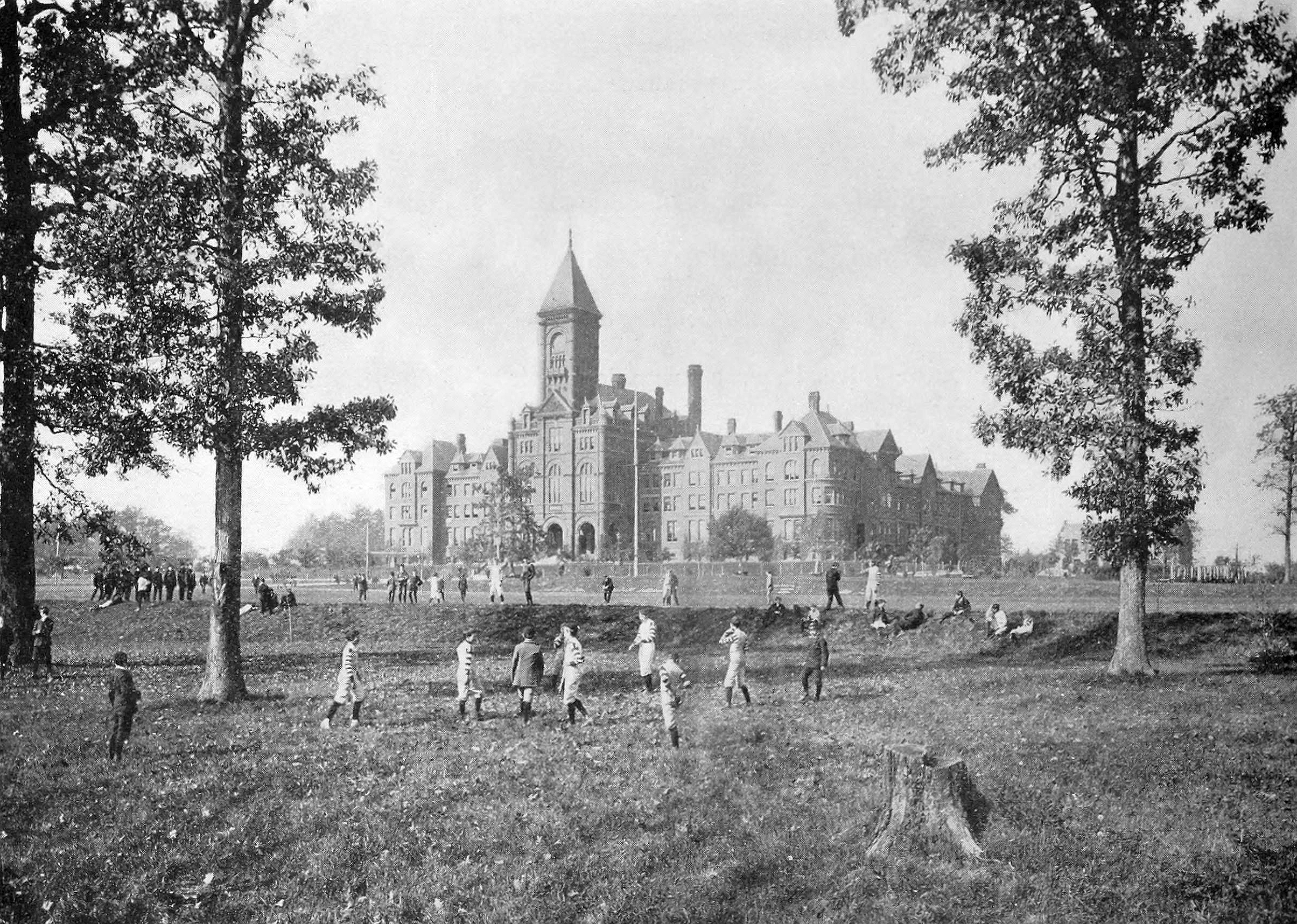
The Deer Park campus in the 1890s

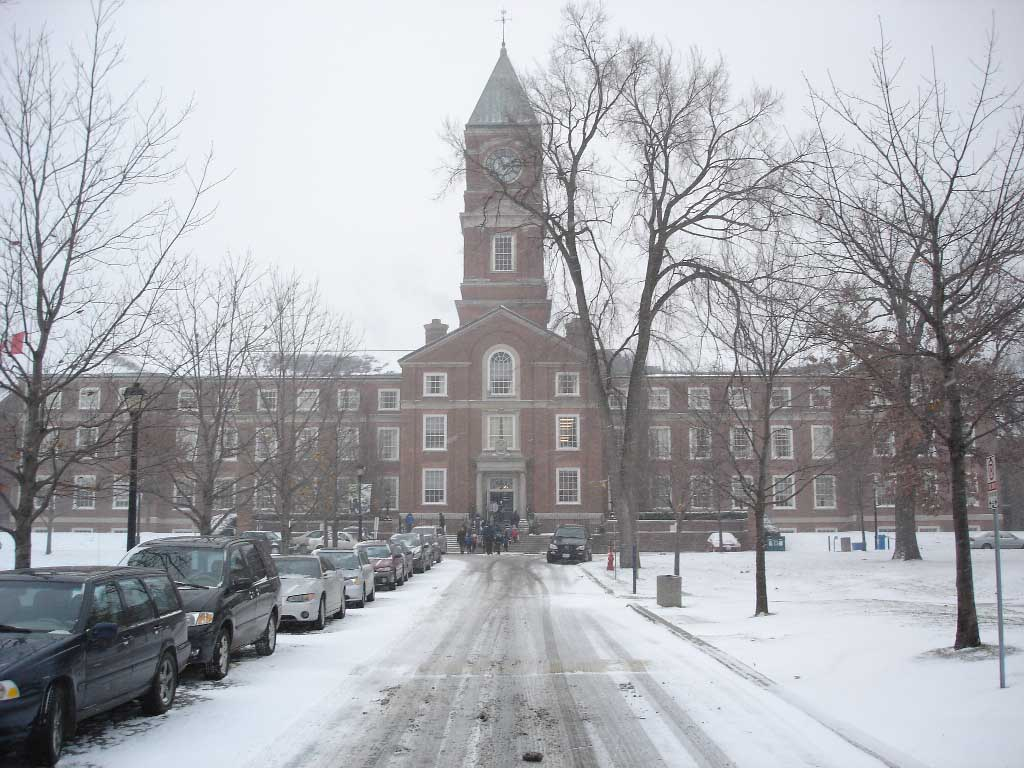
The UCC main building in 2004

In 1887, the Liberal government in Ontario made a move to close UCC. Old Boys (graduates of the College) and other figures helped prevent this, but in reaching the compromise, it was decided that the school would be moved to a new location out of the city centre.

From 1887 to 1891, much effort was directed towards the moving of the College. The principal, then George Dickson, and the architect G.F. Durand toured private schools in the United States, and in February 1888, plans for the new buildings were presented to the government. A property at Avenue Road and St. Clair Avenue was suggested by the government, but was objected to as the 14 acres (57,000 m^{2}) was deemed too small. A new site, slightly further north, was chosen and purchased from Lawrence Baldwin. The ground-breaking for the site's new buildings took place on April 2, 1889.

On July 3, 1891, the bell at the Russell Square campus rang for the last time. UCC then moved to its current site, the Deer Park campus (43.6933°N 79.4042°W), 200 Lonsdale Road at Avenue Road in Forest Hill, with the doors being officially opened on October 14, 1891.

William Dendy described the buildings in his book Lost Toronto:

"Inevitably, given the date, the style of the new buildings was Romanesque Revival. It was built on a foundation of roughly finished Credit Valley sandstone, with upper walls of red brick ornamented with terra cotta panels and string courses. The basic arrangement of the design - a projecting triple-arched entrance, a central tower, and flanking wings forming a quadrangle behind - was very common at the time, and had become firmly established in Toronto with Lennox's City Hall (1996-92).... In fact, the new tower, rising 165 feet (50 m) above the ground, like a church steeple above the surrounding trees, became a symbol of the college - an ever present reminder to students, and to the city below the hill, of the importance of the college and the influence of the alumni that had been shaped by it."

The new buildings purportedly held a room for a commercial course, which contained a counter and series of wickets built to simulate a real bank; these facilities were to help teach boys the routines of banking.

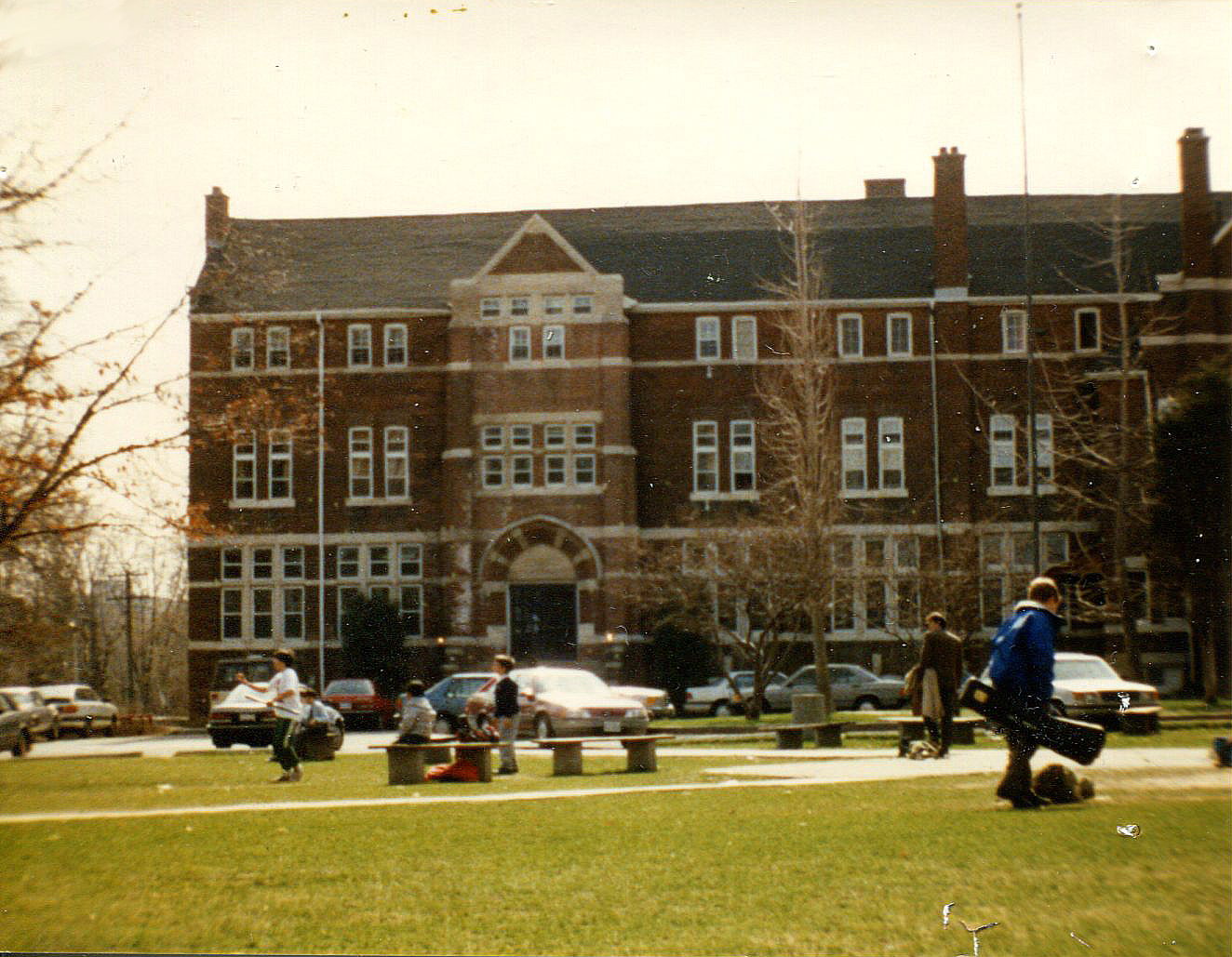
The Peacock Building, which was built in 1902 and demolished in 1991

In 1902, a separate Preparatory School building was constructed at the southern edge of the Deer Park campus, creating two physically separate schools. The new building was designed by Eden Smith and was later called the Peacock Building in honour of Sir Edward Peacock.

The College faced another crisis at the end of the 1950s when it was discovered that the 1891 main building was decaying rapidly due to poor construction; cracks and pipes were appearing throughout, doors frames warped to the point where doors could no longer be opened or closed. Eventually there was a fear that the tower would collapse. Because of these problems, the building was condemned and evacuated by March 12, 1958. Faculty offices were moved to the Prep building, the infirmary, and any other spare spaces, including the principal's residence, Grant House. Classes were conducted in portables.

That same year, a major fundraising campaign was launched as construction of a new building on the exact site of the old was started. Even though construction began in 1958, during the modernist era, the symmetry of the original structure, as well as a clock tower, were repeated. Instead of a Romanesque Revival style, a simplified Georgian Revival style was used. In the summer of 1959, Governor General Vincent Massey laid the cornerstone. Field Marshal Montgomery, 1st Viscount Montgomery of Alamein, dedicated the new front doors on April 28, 1960, and the building was officially opened by Vincent Massey and Sir Edward Peacock on September 28.

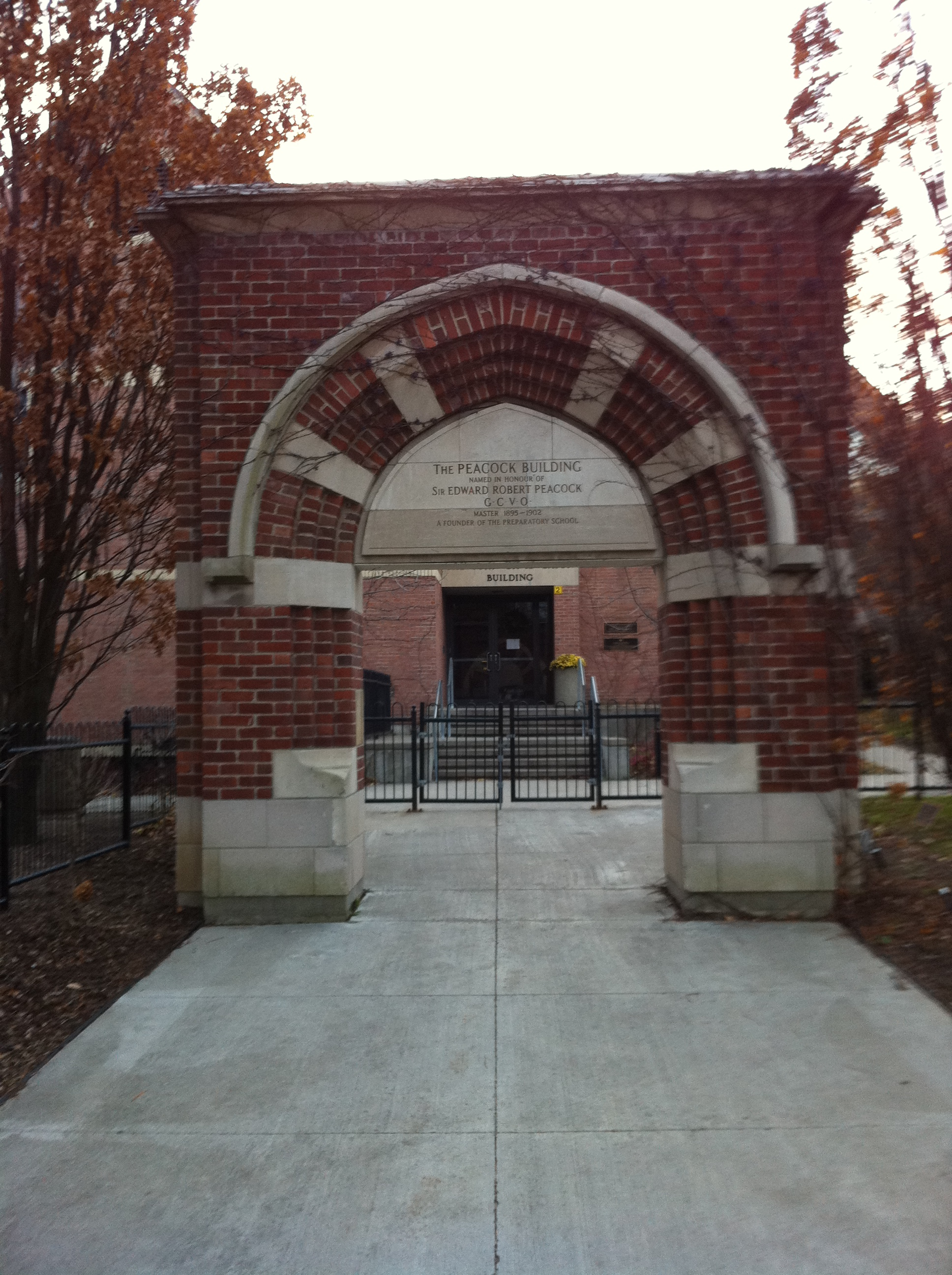
A remnant of the Peacock Building's main entrance stands in the forecourt of the Eaton Building, pictured in 2010

By 1989, the Peacock Building, the Prep School's original structure that was built in 1902, was growing outdated for the needs of the College. It still contained boarding dormitories, bathrooms and masters' quarters, which were being used as storage and makeshift offices. Renovation of the building was considered, but eventually it was decided that a new structure should be built as part of a larger, overall building campaign for the campus. The new Eaton Building, named for the Eaton family that sent many sons to UCC, was completed in 1992, with a modern design that still included references to its historical predecessor. The Gothic-style pointed archway of the Peacock Building's main entrance was reconstructed as a free-standing monument in the forecourt of the Eaton Building.
