= Studio Building (Toronto) =

Coordinates: 43.67325°N 79.386083°W

The Studio Building
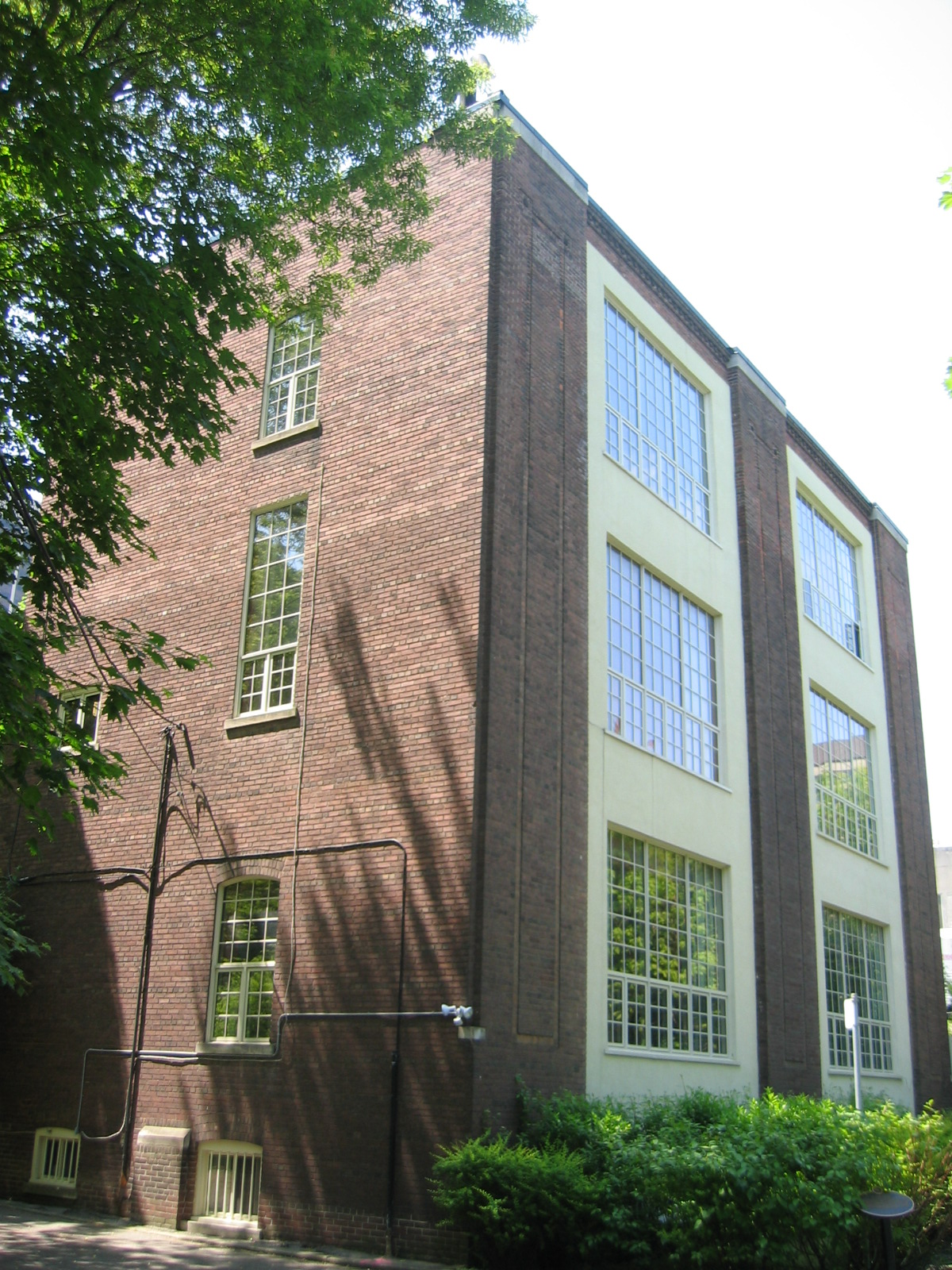
- Interactive map of The Studio Building
- Location: 25 Severn Street; Toronto, Ontario, Canada

History
- Built: 1914
- Original use: Studios

Site notes
- Architect: Eden Smith
- Current use: Studios

National Historic Site of Canada
- Designated: 2005

Ontario Heritage Act
- Designated: 2003

The Studio Building in Toronto, Ontario, Canada, was the home and working studio of several of the Group of Seven painters, their predecessors, and their artistic descendants, and is of enormous significance in the history of Canadian art. The building was designated a National Historic Site of Canada in 2005. It was also designated by the City of Toronto under the Ontario Heritage Act through By-law 115-2003.

Situated at 25 Severn Street, it is located in the Rosedale ravine immediately east of the above-ground Ellis portal that brings subway trains into and out of the north end of the Bloor-Yonge subway station. The site and positioning takes advantage of the northern exposure that illuminates the artist's canvas with very even, neutral light.

== History ==
Financed by Lawren Harris, heir to the Massey-Harris farm machinery fortune, and Dr. James MacCallum, the Studio Building was conceived as a nonprofit facility where the rents were pegged at $22 per month, a level that would cover only expenses. Harris and MacCallum intended the building to be a living, meeting, socializing and, most importantly, a working facility for artists to foster and promote a uniquely Canadian art movement based largely on portraying the landscape of the country.

The building was designed by Arts and Crafts architect Eden Smith. Harris, overseeing construction of the building, was too busy to concentrate on his own artistic endeavours and loaned his own studio space, over the Commerce Bank branch at the northwest corner of Yonge and Bloor streets, to a newly arrived Montrealer, A.Y. Jackson. Construction was completed in January 1914.

Tom Thomson was another of the first residents of the building. The epitome of the starving artist, he had been persuaded to quit the Grip Ltd art design agency, take up residence in the Studio Building, and devote his energies, full-time, to his art. MacCallum financially supported Thomson, who initially shared studio 1 with A.Y. Jackson, for the first twelve months. When Jackson left to work for the government documenting Canadians fighting World War I and Harris departed to be a gunnery instructor, Thomson moved in to share a studio with Franklin Carmichael. When Carmichael married and left a few months later, Thomson, still commercially unsuccessful (he would never, in his lifetime, earn enough to make a living from painting alone), could not afford the $22 monthly studio rental fee. There was another factor: Thomson had never really enjoyed working in the city, felt that a studio was "pretentious," and wanted to work in an environment closer to his beloved wilderness settings. His obvious talent was a great inspiration to the other, older artists, and they were unwilling to see their friend move away. MacCallum spent $176 (a considerable sum in those days) to refurbish a workmen's shed on the east side of the building; it was there, for $1 a month, that Thomson spent his last winters. (Thomson would spend the summers in Algonquin Park as a ranger and fire-fighter and then decamp, during the winter, to Toronto and the Studio Building to work oil sketches made during the summer and fall into full canvases.)

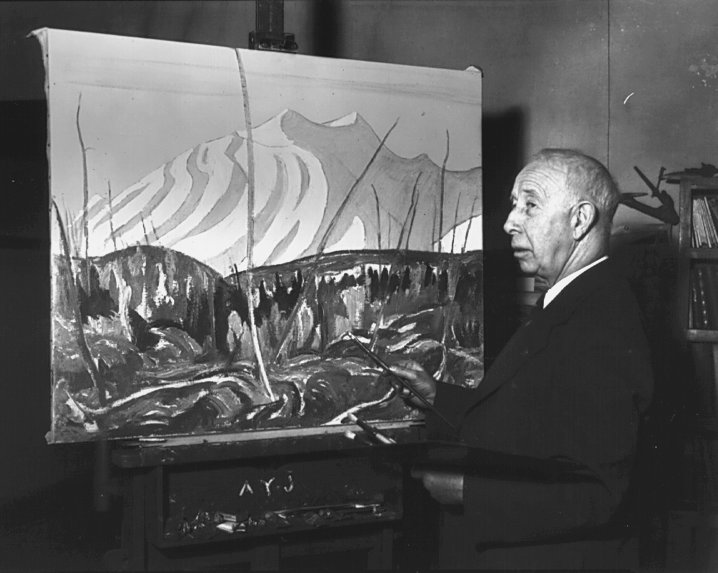
A.Y. Jackson at work in the building

On his return from World War I, Jackson again took up residence, but this time on the top floor, in Studio 6. He removed Thomson's easel, made by Thomson's own hand, from the shed and used it for all the subsequent pictures he produced in the Studio Building. Shortly after he returned from wintering on Georgian Bay, he learned that in his absence he had been included in an informal group of Studio Building artists, exhibiting for the first time, called the Group of Seven. The resulting show had mixed results, but the Group was able to capitalize on the criticism they received; they were seen as vanguards of a new art style that was uniquely Canadian and challenging dated tastes.

By 1940, Harris was living in Vancouver, and his ties to the Studio Building, except emotional, were for all intents and purposes severed. In 1948, he sold the Studio Building to lawyer-turned-artist Gordon MacNamara and a partner for $20,000.

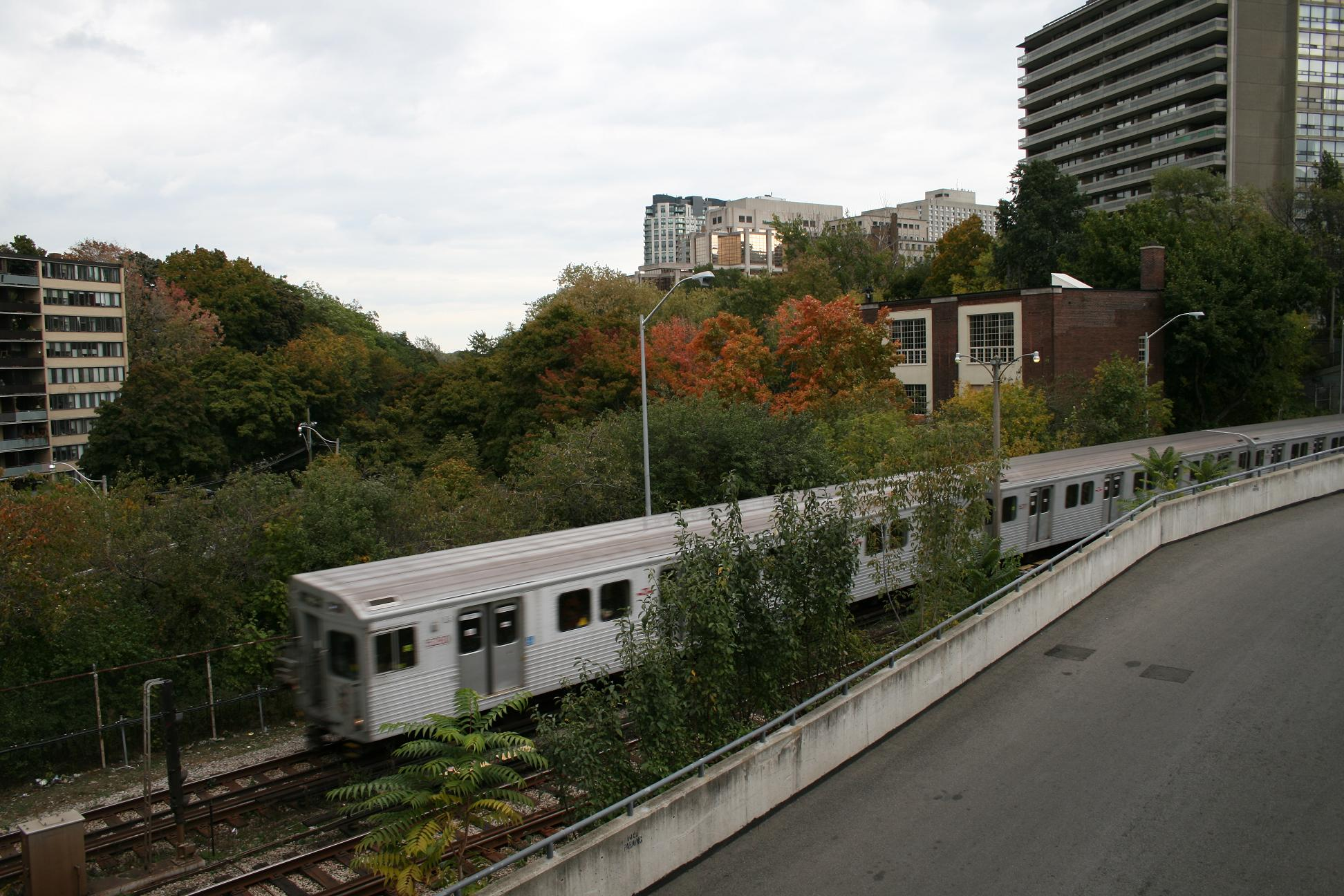
The building was once nestled in a serene valley, but trains now rattle along the nearby subway line

The Studio Building was well beyond its heyday. A.Y. Jackson, who by now was the only remaining member of the original tenants and even of the Group of Seven still living in the building, said in his autobiography "A Painter's Country", that MacNamara slipped notes under the door of his studio complaining about the noise of his hammering while stretching canvases - MacNamara was a watercolourist working on paper - and mandating that Jackson would have to do his prep work in the basement. He left other notes, admonishing Jackson for walking about in his studio, insisting that he wear felt-soled shoes to muffle the noise. An unhappy Jackson left the building in 1955 with Lawren Harris mourning, in a letter from Vancouver:

Your moving from the Studio Building marks the end of an era, the one era of creative art that has the greatest significance for Canada... You were the real force and inspiration that led all of us into a modern conception that suited this country, and the last to leave the home base of operations.

It was only after lengthy negotiations with MacNamara that art collector Robert McMichael, in 1962, was able to purchase Tom Thomson's old shack and have it removed for exhibit at the McMichael gallery in Kleinberg, northwest of the city. MacNamara was concerned that locals, who were well aware of the shed's historic significance, might think him too eager to dispose of it. The terms, when finalized, stipulated that McMichael would pay MacNamara $800 and landscape the resulting vacant spot so as to remove any trace of the shed's presence.

In 1979, the young Toronto artist, Ross Marks, took up residence at the Studio Building. In this vibrant environment, he garnered significant support from MacNamara, as well as resident artists Charles Redfern, Harold Town and art critic and author, Paul Duval. MacNamara and Duval both were instrumental in sponsoring Marks' 1986 application for a Canada Council Arts grant, which he was subsequently awarded. Marks debuted his work there in 1980 with "The First Exhibition" followed by "Puerto Rico Impressions" in 1981 and "Toronto: A Beautiful Meeting Place" in 1982.

MacNamara himself faced challenges near the end of his long life when the City of Toronto approved a proposal by Canadian Tire in 2003 to construct 18- and 25-storey condominium towers on the western side of the ravine. As the condominium buildings threatened to destroy the quality of light that artist tenants had enjoyed for nine decades, MacNamara appealed the approval to the Ontario Municipal Board. MacNamara eventually withdrew his appeals, and the condominium approvals came into full force and effect. As a condition of his withdrawal, he received a $75,000 settlement from Canadian Tire.

Backed by endorsements from the National Gallery of Canada, the Art Gallery of Ontario, and the Architectural Conservancy of Ontario, MacNamara applied for — and won — National Historic Site status for the building.

Gordon MacNamara died in 2006, leaving the future of the building in some question. His adopted son has expressed interest in selling the building, appraised for $1.37 million. While its designation as an historic site protects only the outside of the building, many hope that a new owner will do as much as possible to protect its legacy as a Canadian art treasure.

== Bibliography ==
- Jackson, A.Y.: A Painter's Country: The Autobiography of A.Y. Jackson, Clarke Irwin & Company Ltd.; Toronto, 1958. ISBN 0772011028
- Larsen, Wayne: A.Y. Jackson: A Love for the Land, XYZ Publishing; Lantzville, B.C., 2003. ISBN 1-894852-06-0
- McMichael, Robert: One Man's Obsession, Prentice-Hall Canada Inc.;Scarborough Ontario, 1986. ISBN 0-13-566944-8
