= Eden Smith =

Canadian architect (1859–1949)

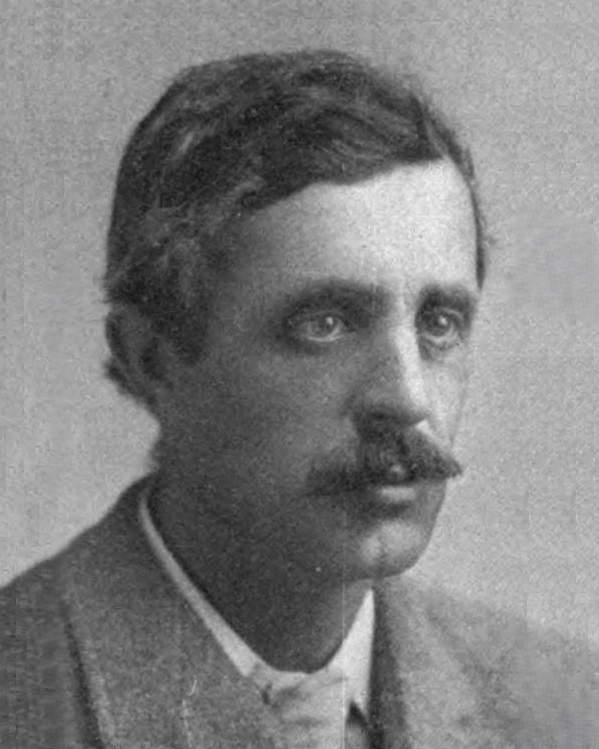
- Born: 20 June 1856; Birmingham, England
- Died: 10 October 1949 (aged 93); Toronto, Ontario
- Occupation: Architect
- Buildings: Grace Church on-the-Hill; St. Thomas's Anglican Church; Studio Building

Eden Smith (20 June 1859 – 10 October 1949) was a British-Canadian architect who belonged to the Arts and Crafts movement. Born in Birmingham, England, he achieved prominence as an architect in Toronto, Ontario. He was a founding member of The Arts and Letters Club of Toronto (in 1908) and the first president of the Toronto Architectural Eighteen Club (in 1900).

== Toronto buildings ==
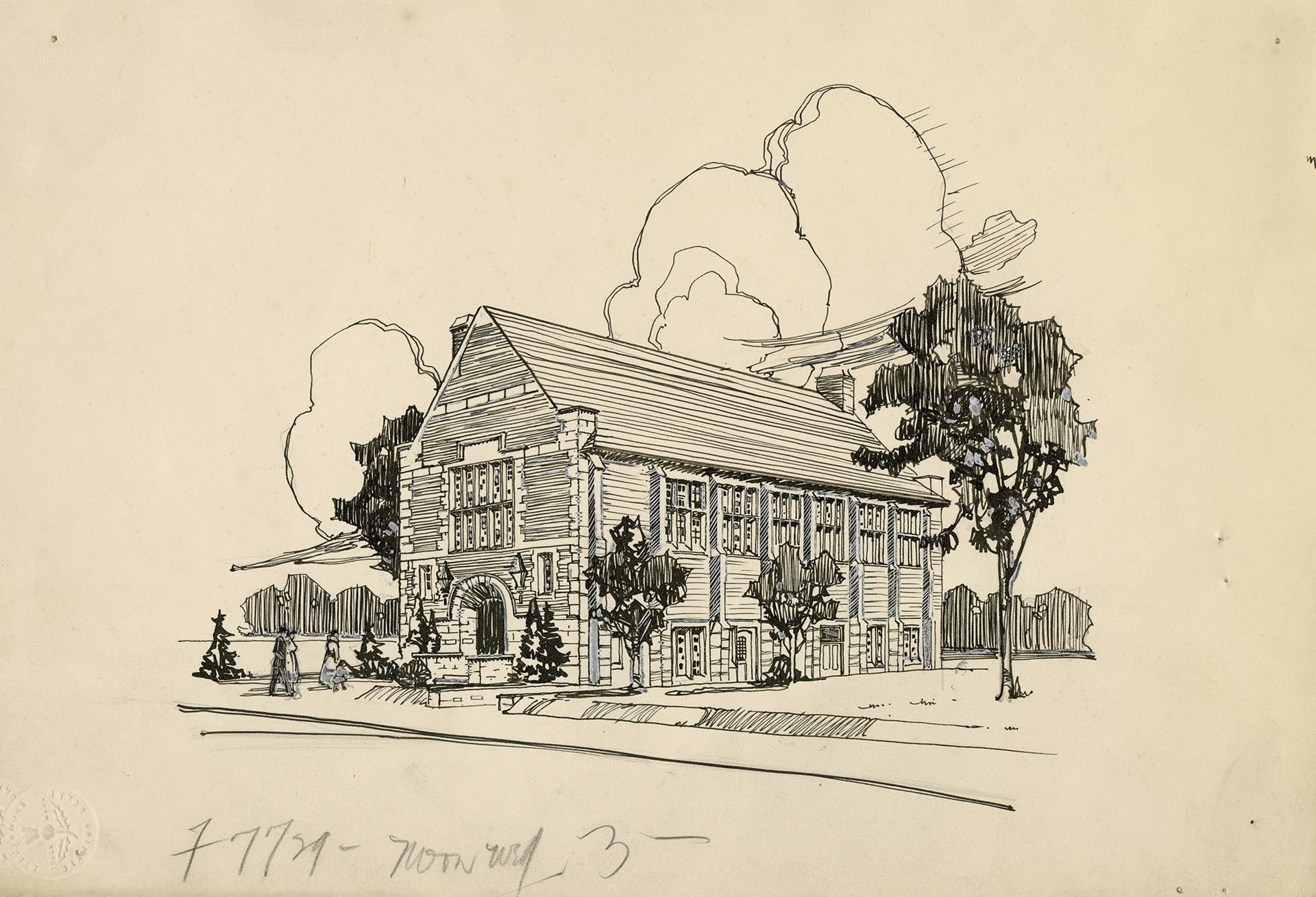
Wychwood Branch, Toronto Public Library. Eden Smith & Sons Architects drawing, 1926.

Smith was a prolific Toronto architect who designed a variety of buildings, although he is best remembered for his domestic architecture. He arrived in Toronto in 1888 with his wife, Annie, and began Eden Smith architectural practice in 1892.

His early projects in Toronto included St. Cyprian's Anglican Church (1891–92; demolished in 1922) on Christie Street in Seaton Village, St. Thomas's Anglican Church (1892) on Huron Street, where he was a parishioner, and St. John the Evangelist Anglican Church on Portland Street, also known as the Garrison Church (1892–93; demolished in November 1963). He later designed the Peacock Building (c. 1902; demolished in 1991) at the preparatory school of Upper Canada College, the Parish Hall (1908) of St. Simon's Anglican Church on Howard Street, Grace Church on-the-Hill (1912) and its rectory, as well as the Forest Hill residence of Frederick Wilhelm Kischel at 241 Poplar Plains Road (which later served as Thornton Hall private school), among many other commissions.

He also built the 1899 St. Hilda's College building (now a seniors' residence named John Gibson House) at the original property of Trinity College on Queen Street West (which became Trinity Bellwoods Park), the Caldecott House (1906) on Woodlawn Avenue West, as well as the Devonshire House Residences (1907) on Devonshire Place (at Hoskin Avenue) on the main campus of the University of Toronto.

During the First World War, he built three Carnegie libraries for the Toronto Public Library: the Wychwood branch, the High Park branch, and the Beaches branch. In 1913, he designed the Riverdale Courts, later the Bain Co-op, an early low-income housing project near Withrow Park in Riverdale. He is also credited with the Studio Building (1914) at 25 Severn Street, which was the non-profit home/studio of many of the Group of Seven artists.

He designed many of the homes in the Wychwood Park neighbourhood and is thought to have built approximately 250 residences in Toronto over his career. His homes are strongly influenced by the English Arts and Crafts movement, and many fall within the English Cottage style with steeply pitched roofs, tall chimneys, bands of small-paneled casement windows, and side-center internal plans.

Outside of Toronto, he designed St. George's Memorial Church in Oshawa, completed in 1924.

He retired in 1925, marking the end of the Eden Smith & Son practice that he ran with the assistance of his younger son, Ralph Eden Smith (1890–1972). He died on October 10, 1949, and is buried at Woodlawn Cemetery in Guelph, Ontario. His elder son, Harry Smith, had also been an architect and worked with his father from 1907 until World War I.

EdenSmith Lane, located in Toronto's Cabbagetown neighbourhood, honours Eden Smith, who had been a resident of nearby Salisbury Street. His public housing co-op project, located in Cabbagetown at Spruce and Sumach Streets, was built in 1917 and is another example of his work.

== Gallery ==
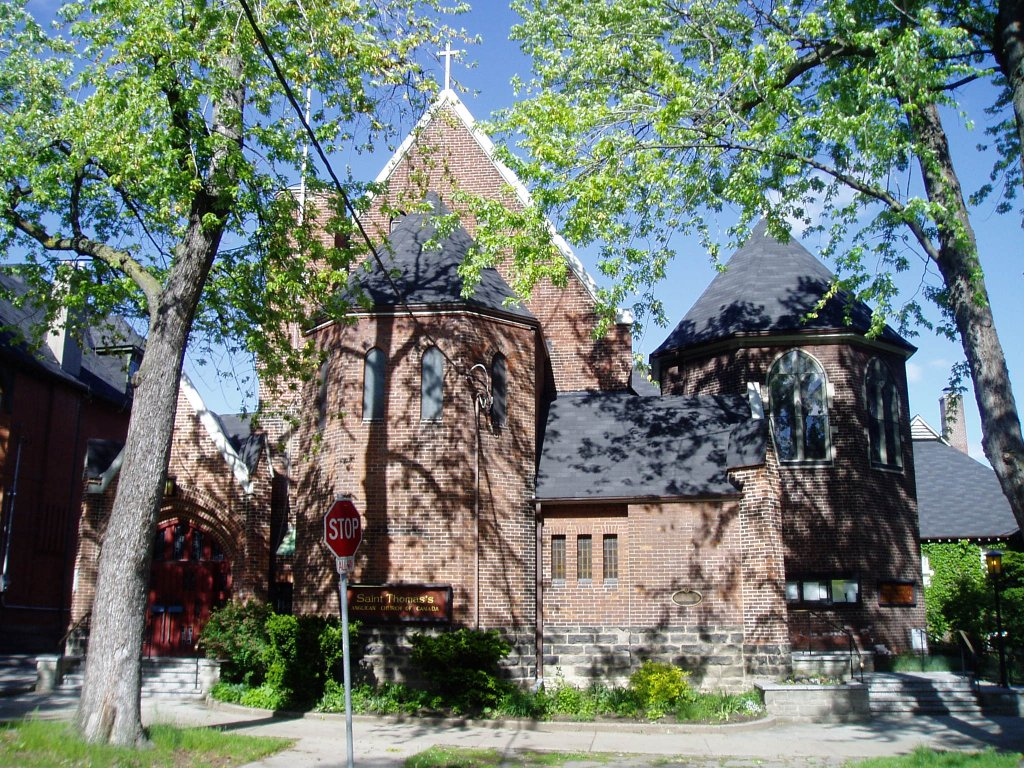
St. Thomas's Anglican Church (1892)

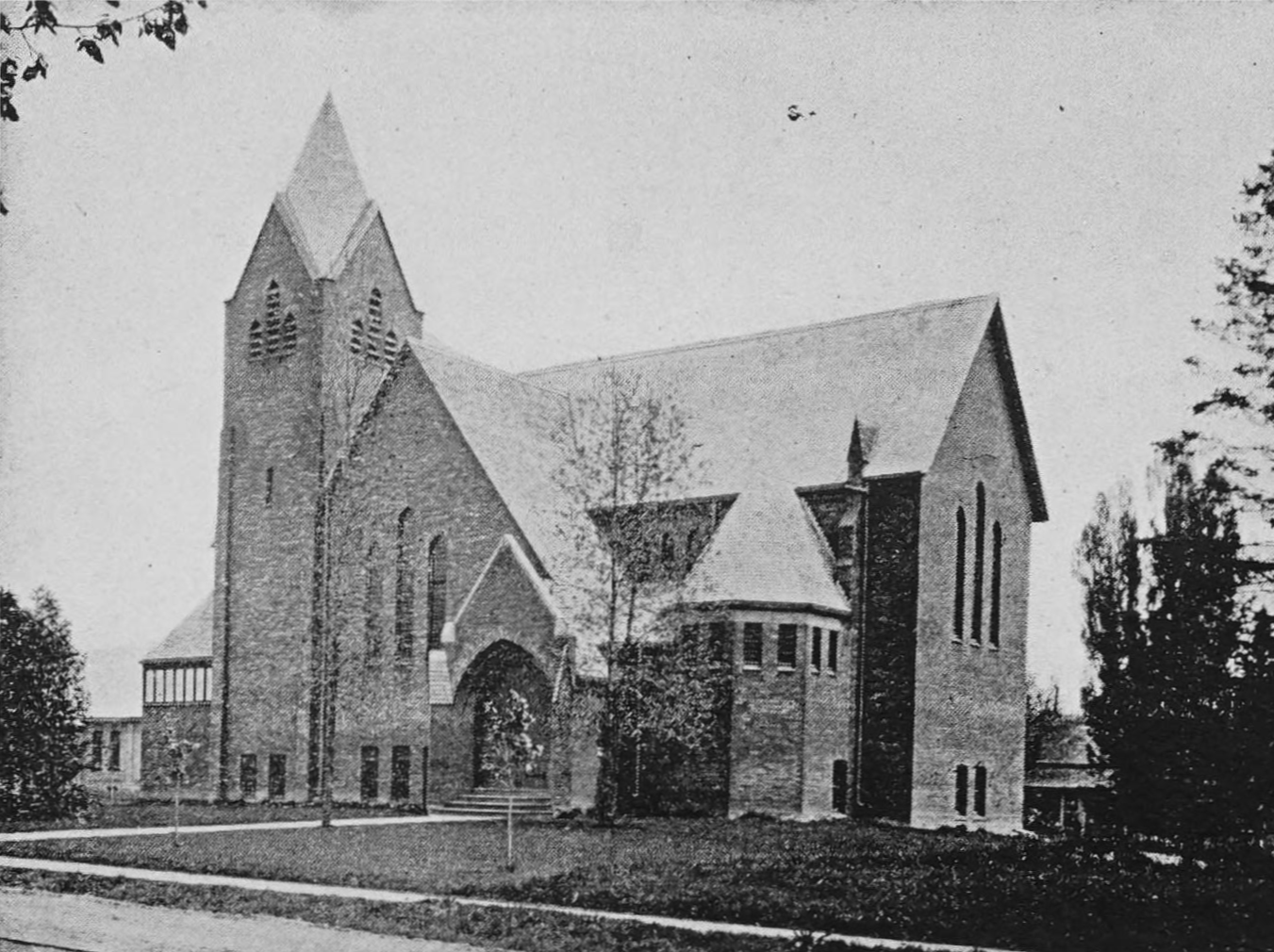
Church of St John the Evangelist, Kitchener (1894)

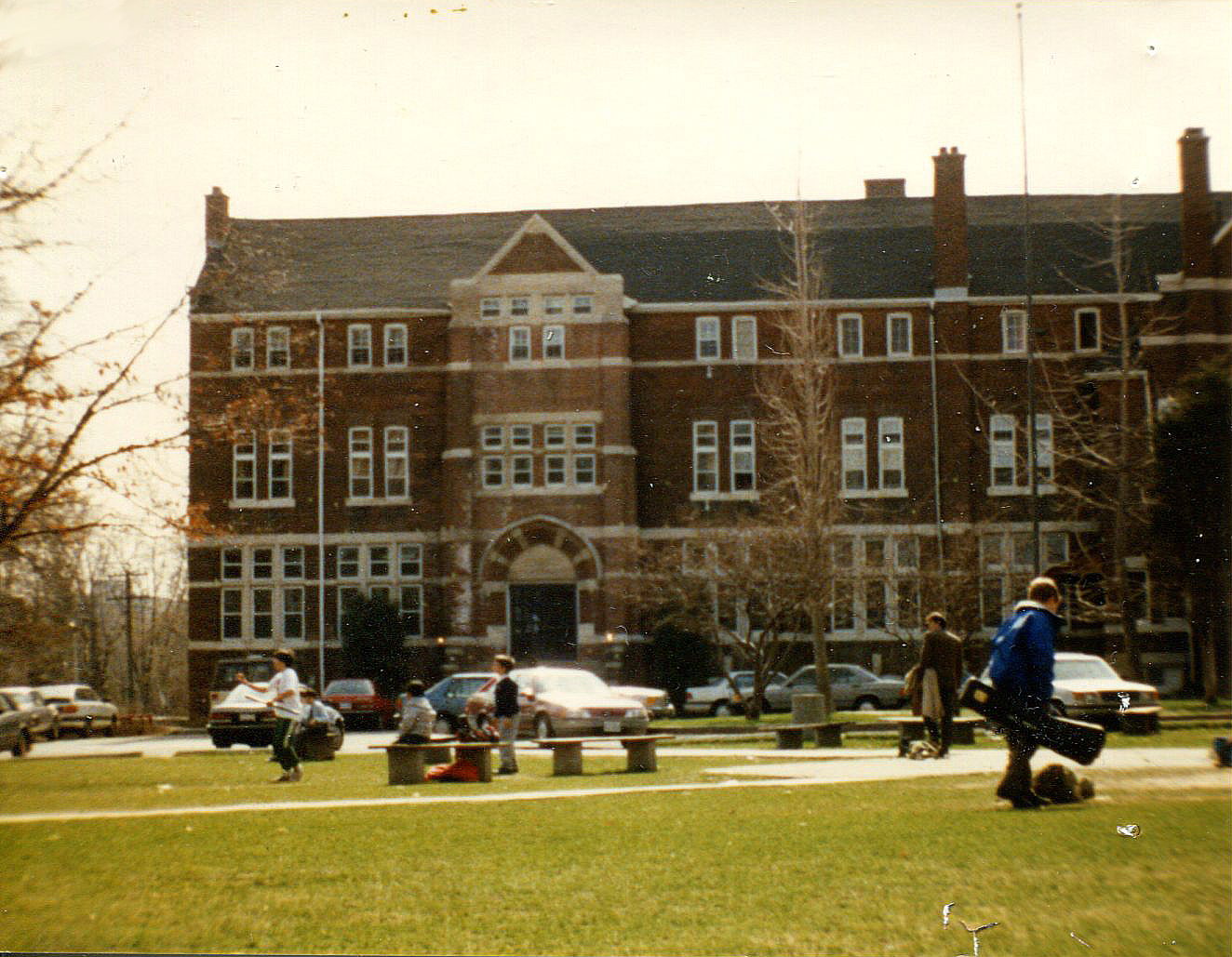
The Peacock Building at Upper Canada College (c. 1902; demolished in 1991)

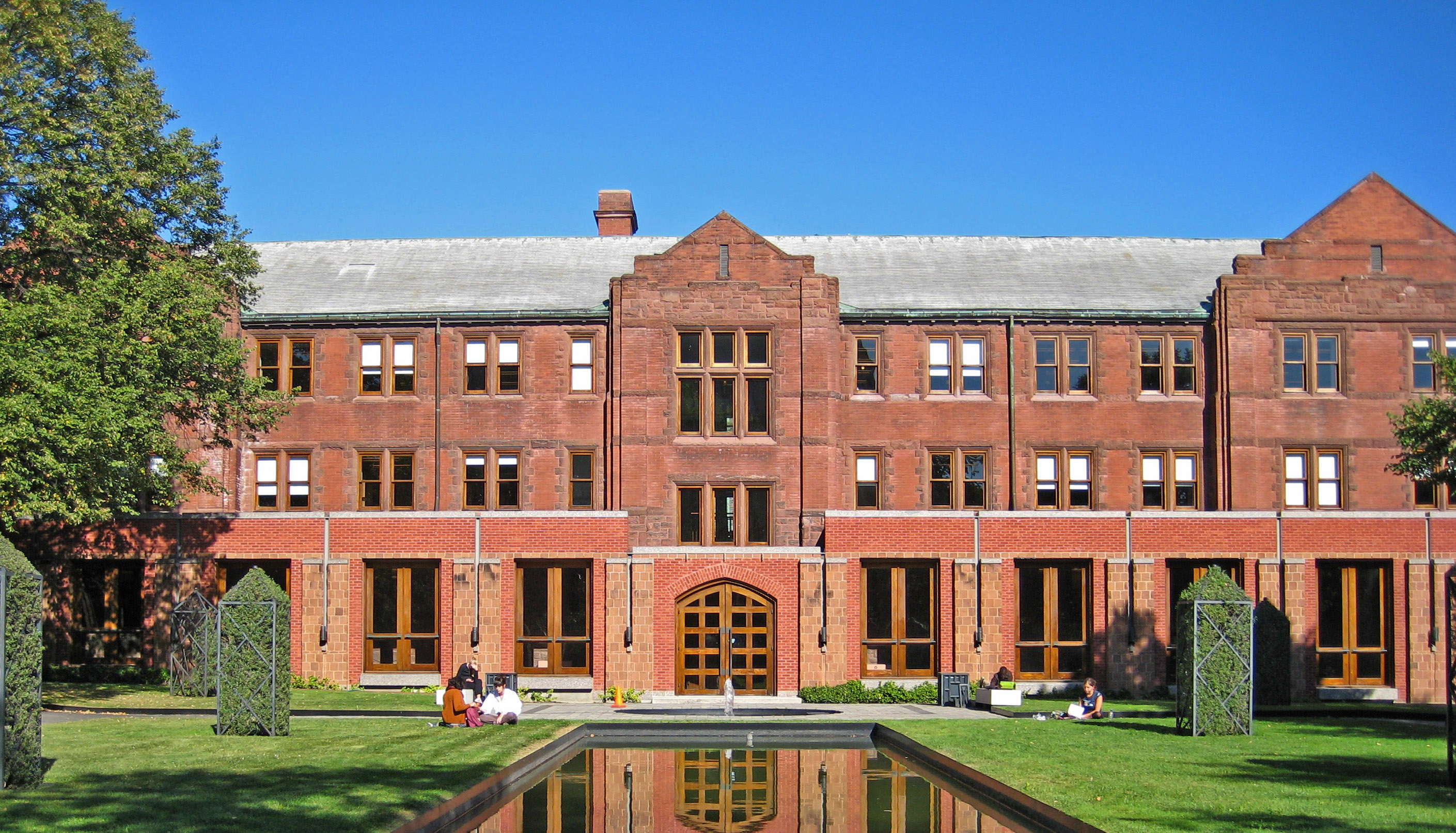
Devonshire House Residences (1907) at University of Toronto

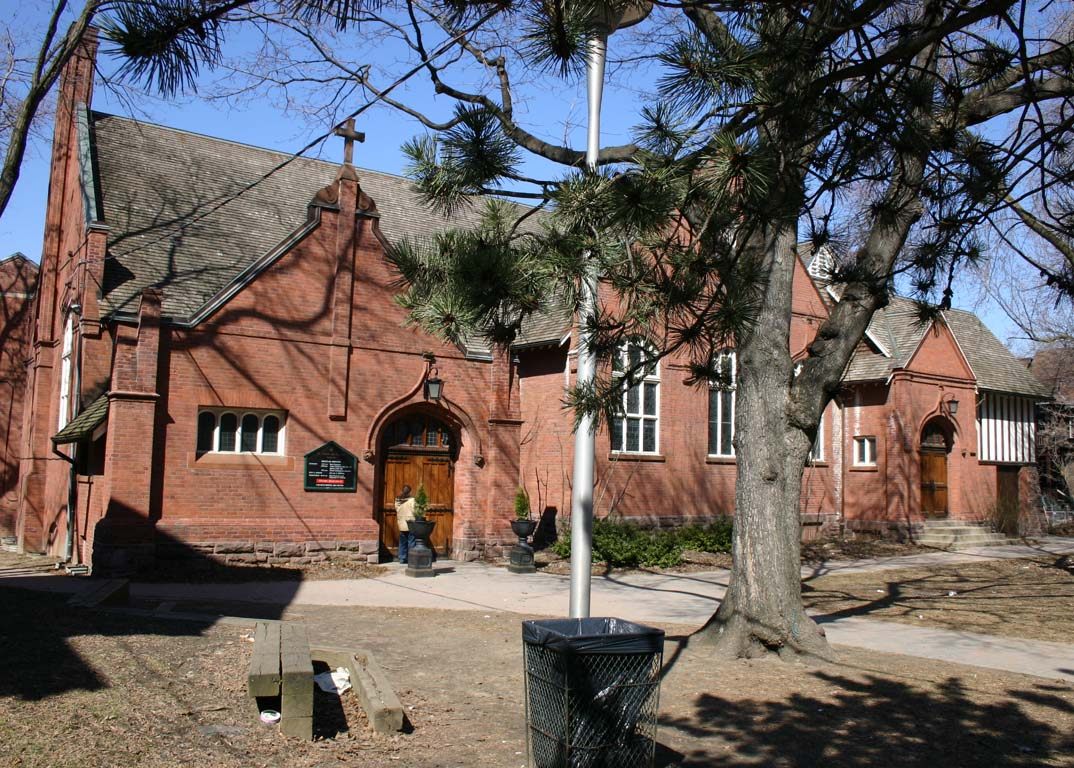
St. Simon's Anglican Church, Parish Hall (1908)

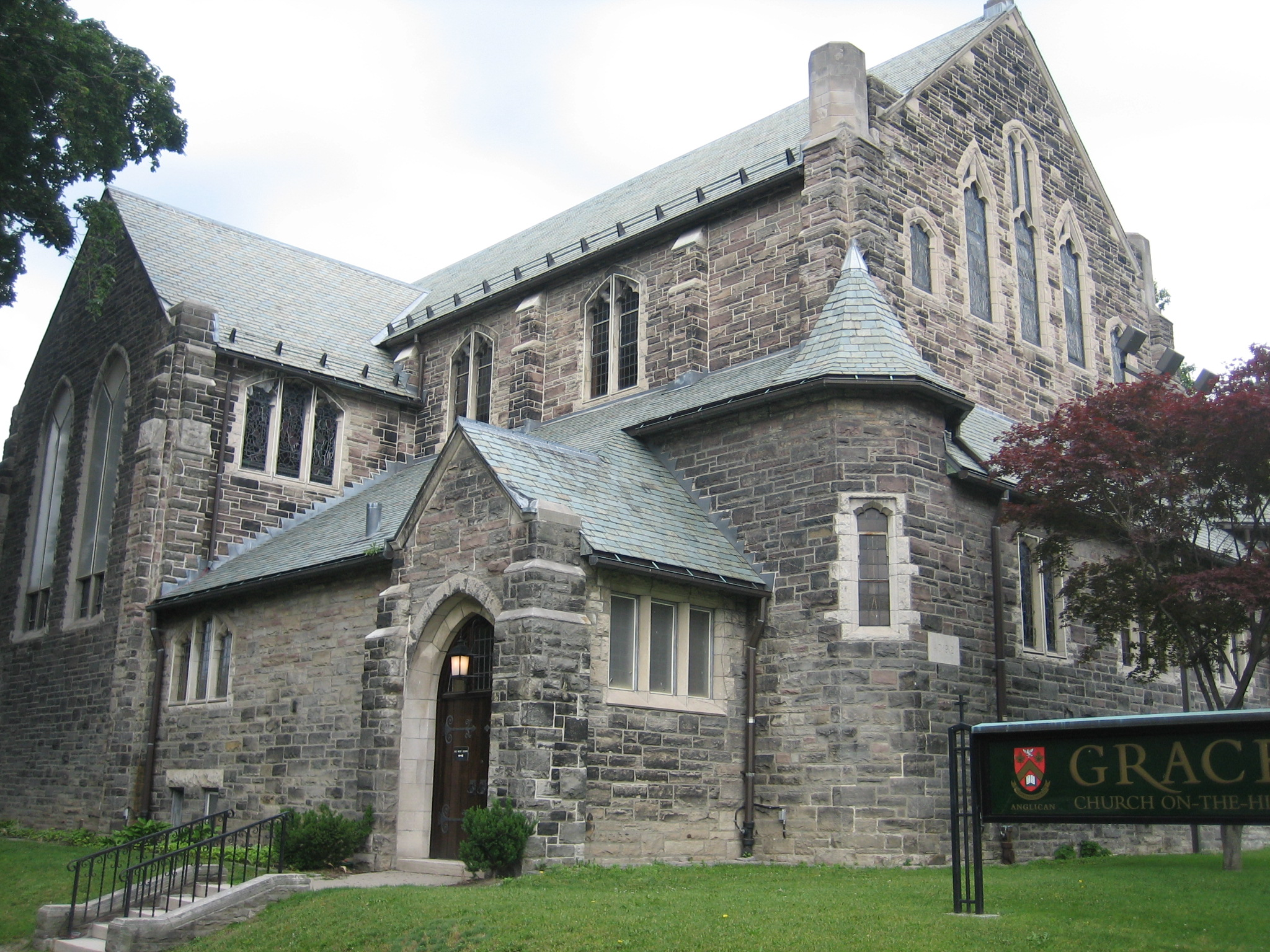
Grace Church on-the-Hill (1912)

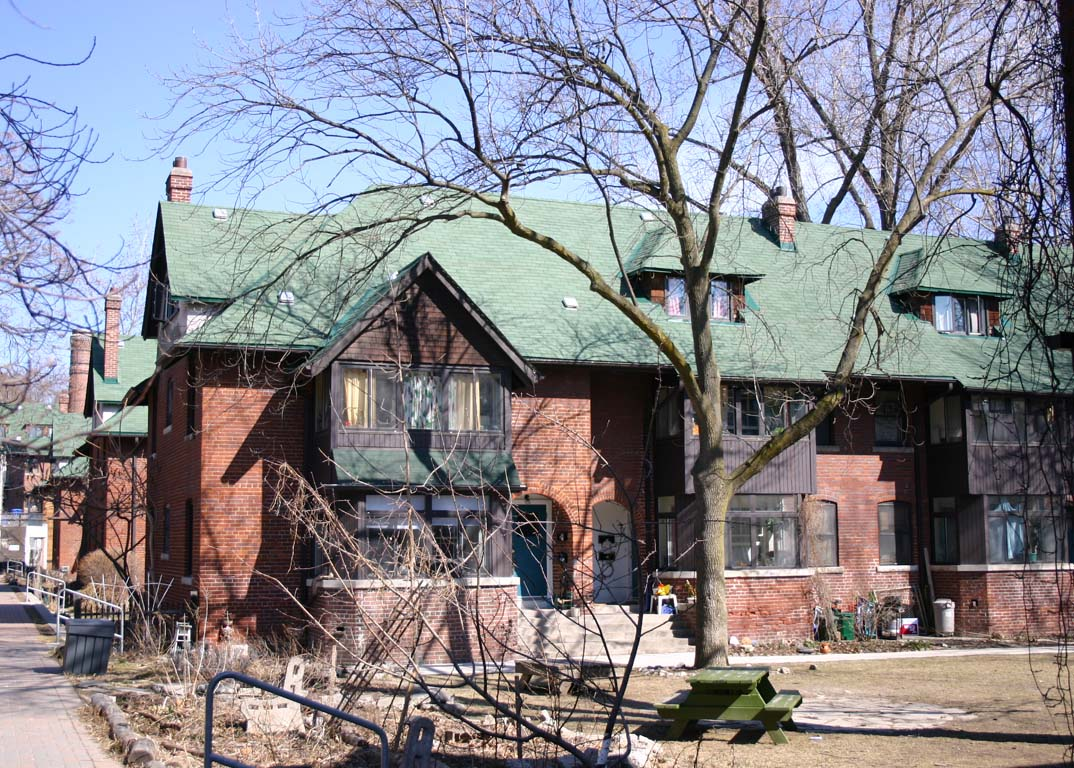
Bain Co-op (1913)

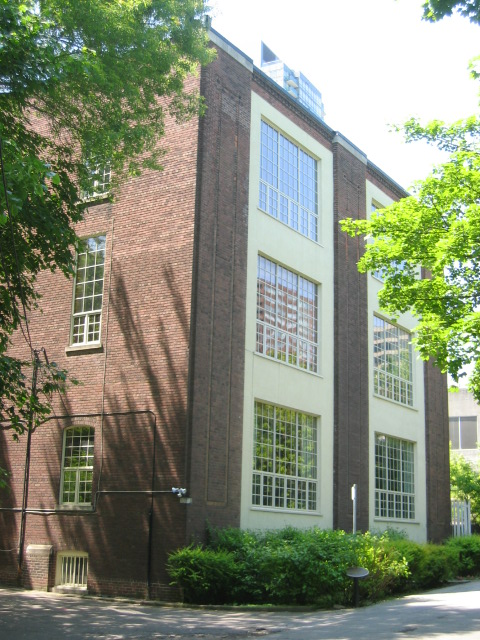
Studio Building (1914)
