= Frederick Ongley =

Canadian Anglican priest

Frederick George Ongley (1912–2002) was a Canadian Anglican priest in the 20th century.

Ongley was educated at Trinity College, Toronto. Ordained in 1939, his first post was a curacy at St Clement's, Eglinton. He was a Chaplain in the RCAF from 1942 to 1947. He was on the staff of St Matthew's Pro-Cathedral, Brandon from 1947 to 1954; Rector of St John's, Peterborough from 1954 to 1963; and then of St George's, Oshawa from 1963 to 1977. He was Archdeacon of Peterborough from 1956 to 1963; and then of Scarborough from 1969 to 1974.

Ongley died in 2002 in Comox, British Columbia, at the age of 90.
