= Grace Church on-the-Hill =

Coordinates: 43.689543°N 79.410175°W

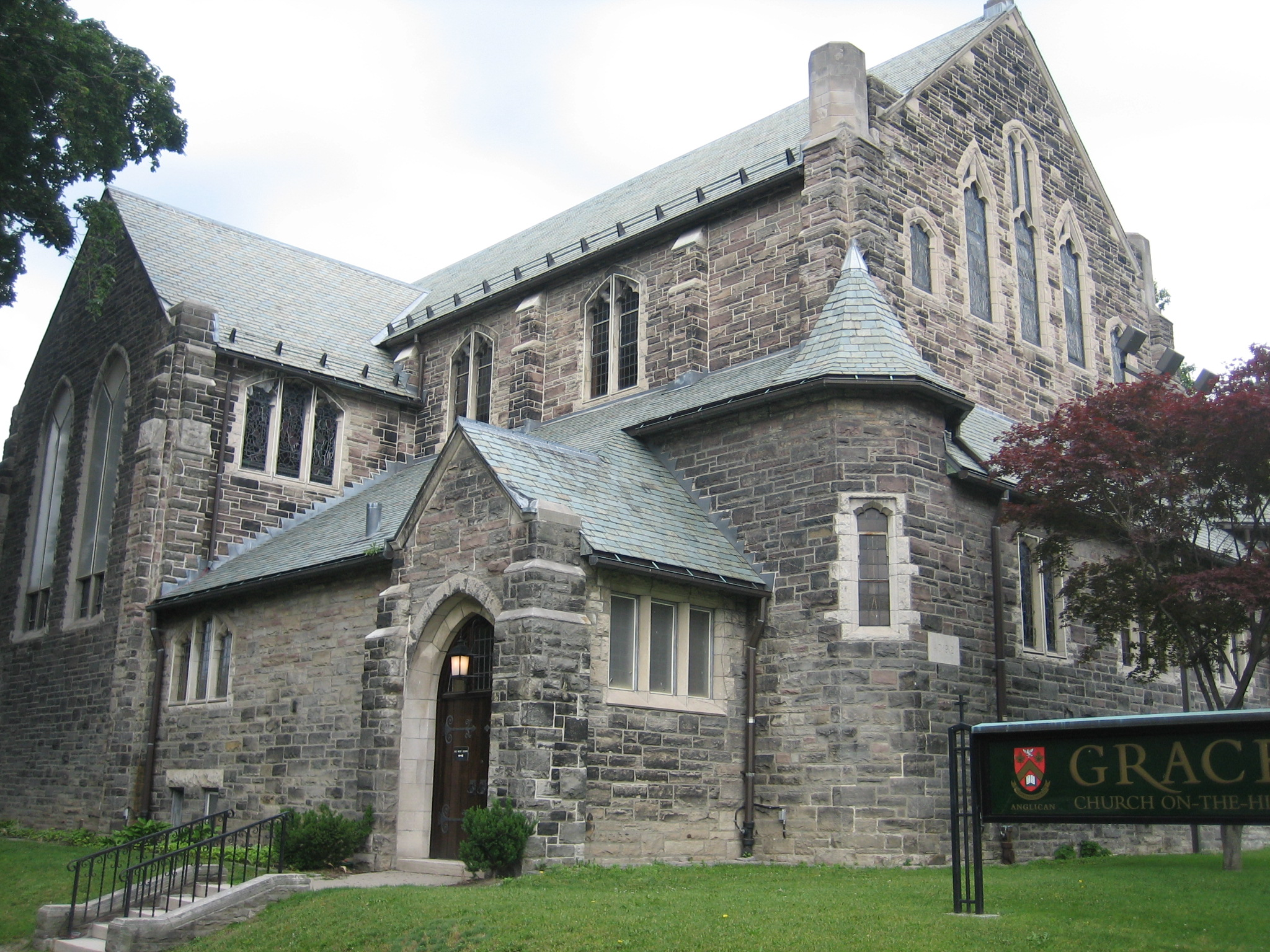
- The parish church in 2008
- Grace Church on-the-Hill
- Location: 300 Lonsdale Road; Toronto, Ontario, Canada
- Denomination: Anglican Church of Canada
- Website: gracechurchonthehill.ca

History
- Dedication: Grace

Architecture
- Architect: Eden Smith
- Style: Gothic Revival
- Years built: 1912–1955

Administration
- Province: Ontario
- Diocese: Toronto

Clergy
- Priest: The Rev. Don Beyers

Grace Church on-the-Hill is a parish of the Anglican Church of Canada in the Diocese of Toronto. The parish church is located at 300 Lonsdale Road, in the Forest Hill area of Toronto, Ontario.

Grace Church is featured in the novel A Prayer for Owen Meany by John Irving, and it is a member of the Churches on the Hill group.

== History ==
Work on the current building, designed by Eden Smith, began in May 1912. Opening services at the new church took place on 21 December 1913.

In 1923, the Parish Hall, with an auditorium and gymnasium below, was completed, as well as the vestries on the north side of the chancel. The original Eden Smith design was completed in 1938, including a chapel on the south side.

A two-story addition on the west side was built in 1955 as an Education Centre. This now houses offices, meeting rooms and a childcare centre.

== See also ==
- List of Anglican churches in Toronto
