= 64 Woodlawn Avenue West =

64 Woodlawn Avenue West known also as the Caldecott House
- Interactive map of the 64 Woodlawn Avenue West known also as the Caldecott House area

General information
- Architectural style: Period Revival style influenced by the Arts and Crafts Movement
- Location: 64 Woodlawn Avenue West
- Coordinates: 43°41′01″N 79°23′43″W
- Year built: 1906
- Owner: Stapleton Caldecott

Technical details
- Material: brick cladding, brick, stone and wood detailing, wood strapwork in the gables
- Size: 9000 square feet
- Floor count: 2½-stories

Design and construction
- Architect: Eden Smith

Ontario Heritage Act
- Official name: Caldecott House (as originally designated)
- Designated: 2018

The property located at 64 Woodlawn Avenue West in Toronto, also known as the Caldecott House, is a heritage residence, located in the St. Paul's (Ward 22) area of the city. The 2 1/2-storey detached house was designated under the Ontario Heritage Act in 2018, deemed notable for its design by noted architect Eden Smith.

== Heritage details ==
Per the official designation, the building “is valued for its design as a fine representative example of an early 20th century house form building designed in the Period Revival style influenced by the Arts and Crafts Movement as interpreted by architect Eden Smith. It is distinguished by its asymmetrical plan with the projecting bays, the complicated roofline with the gables and the distinctive canted chimneys, and the decorative wood strapwork.” The house was commissioned by Robert Stapleton Pitt Caldecott in 1906. Caldecott served as president of the Toronto Board of Trade and was a “highly regarded businessman” and his information was included in the nomination for the heritage designation.

In 2024, the current owners of the residence applied to the Toronto Preservation Board to have the historic designation removed from the residence; the owners state that Caldecott “held restrictive views on immigration and advocated for assimilation to protect the character of Canada under the Empire”, which they could not agree with. The current owners also want the designation removed as they feel Caldecott would not approve of them inhabiting the house he commissioned. The Preservation Board rejected their request to have the designation removed, saying the residence is also notable for its unique architectural qualities. The Board did agree to remove all mentions of Caldecott from the designation documents, given his views on immigration. The owners had sought to make alterations to certain elements on the property that are protected under the heritage designation; when they were told they would need to get permission from the city before make any significant changes, the owners stated they were not aware of the heritage designation on their home. When their request to have the historic designation removed was declined, their lawyer explained that they might seek judgement from the Ontario Human Rights Tribunal if necessary.

The City of Toronto currently (as of May 2024) does not have regulations in place that prevent historical designations based on their associations with controversial figures, but similar issues have been raised (for example, the renaming of Yonge–Dundas Square (now Sankofa Square), due to its association with Henry Dundas). City representatives explained to CBC/Radio Canada that the City normally receives 1800 to 2000 requests a year to have changes made to the architectural features of heritage properties, and that most requests are approved.

The City later decided to restore Caldecott's name to the property, after his descendants provided further research (including private correspondence), showing that Caldecott "did not separate people by race or creed," it says, noting that, at the time, the British Empire "was not just Canada, Australia and Britain, it encompassed many Islands in the Caribbean like Antigua and Barbuda, Barbados, Bermuda, India, Pakistan, East Pakistan (Bangladesh) as well as Ceylon (Sri Lanka). (...) The only people he would have attempted to block from entering the country was the likes of American merchants in order to protect and build the young nation of Canada."
