= St. George's Memorial Church (Oshawa) =

Anglican church in Oshawa, Canada

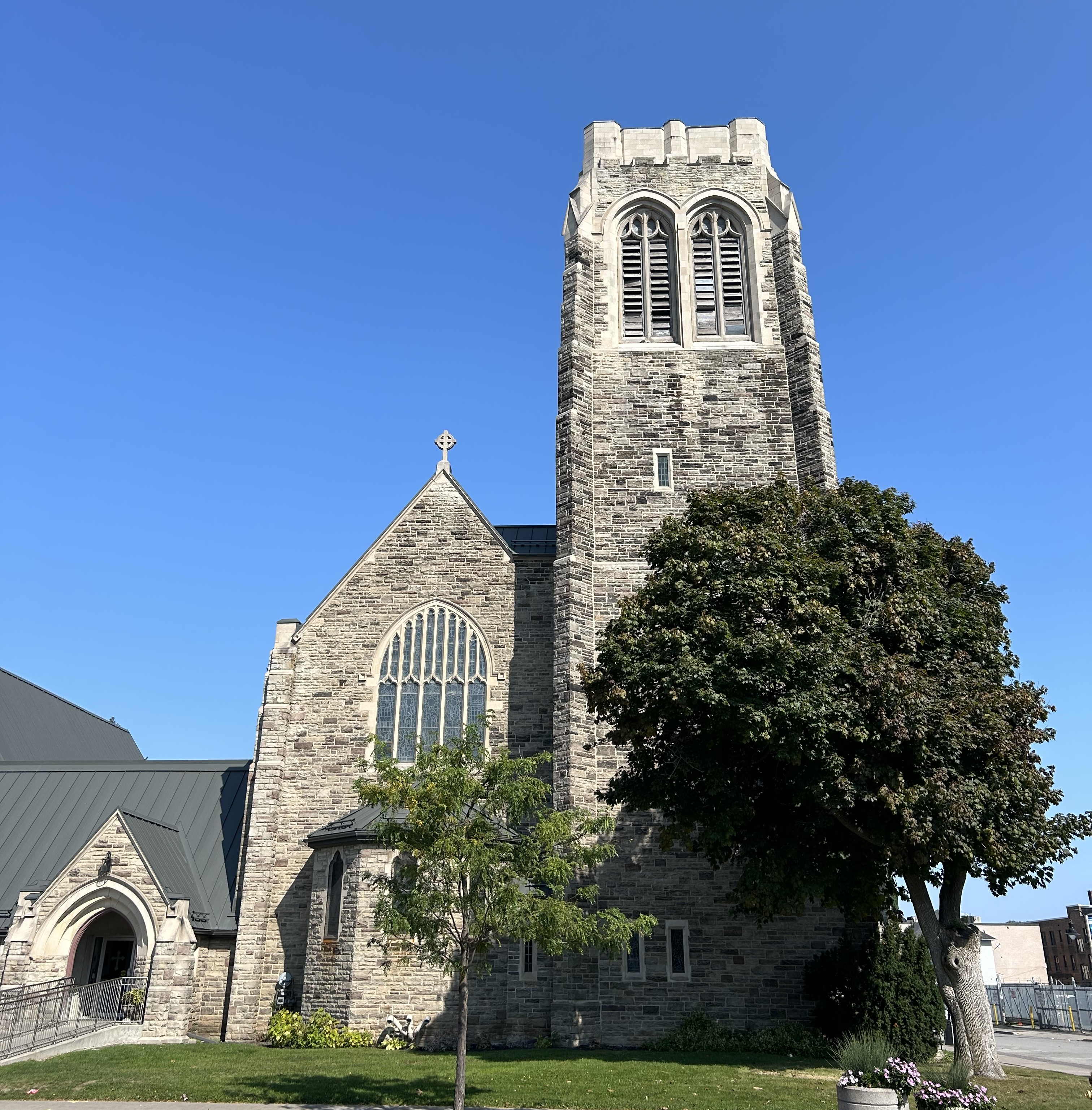
- The church in September 2024
- St. George's Memorial Church
- 43.8956926°N 78.8672316°W
- Location: 51 Centre Street West; Oshawa, Ontario, Canada
- Denomination: Anglican Church of Canada
- Churchmanship: High church
- Website: stgeorgesoshawa.org

History
- Founded: 1843

Architecture
- Architect: Eden Smith
- Style: Gothic Revival
- Years built: 1922–1924

Administration
- Province: Ontario
- Diocese: Toronto
- Archdeaconry: East
- Deanery: Oshawa

Clergy
- Rector: The Rev. Dr. Alvardo Adderley

St. George's Memorial Church is an Anglican church in Oshawa, Ontario, Canada.

== History ==
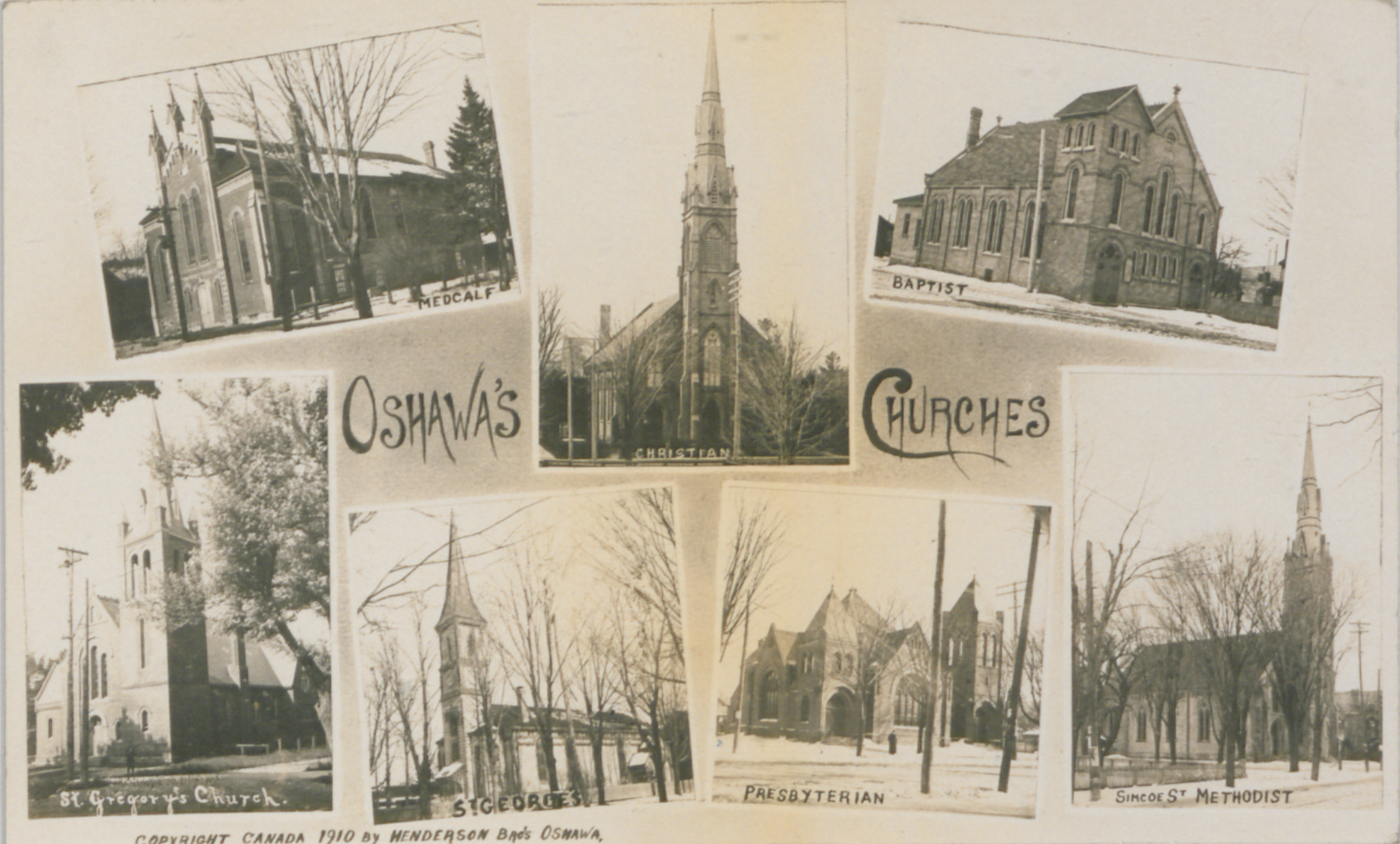
Postcard of Oshawa's churches with the second St. George's Church, bottom row, second from left, 1910

St. George in Oshawa was founded in 1843 as a mission of St. John's, Whitby, and St. Paul's, Columbus. Services were held in the town hall and court house. They built their first permanent church building, a wood-frame structure at the northeast corner of King Street and Park Road, around 1847. The first incumbent was the Rev. John Pentland. It became an independent parish in 1859.

The second church building was constructed in 1858 at the southeast corner of Centre Street and John Street, today Memorial Park. It was also a wood-frame structure and featured a steeple. The church was enlarged in 1881 and consecrated on October 9, 1881, by Arthur Sweatman, Bishop of Toronto. A cairn marking the spot of the old church was unveiled by members of the parish on St. George's Day 1939.

In 1864, the parish acquired the land on Park Road North which became St. George's Anglican Cemetery. The earliest burial dates from 1841. Alexander Bethune, later Bishop of Toronto, consecrated the ground.

The Rev. Charles R. de Pencier became rector in 1910 and began planning to construct a new church on the site of the existing rectory. The outbreak of World War I halted these plans. On June 12, 1919, sod was turned for a new church by the Duke of Devonshire, Governor General of Canada. The cornerstone was laid by Major General James Howden MacBrien, Chief of the General Staff, on October 7, 1922. The church was renamed St. George's Memorial Church, in memory of those killed during the war.

The new church was opened on May 11, 1924, by James Sweeny, Bishop of Toronto. Trumpeters from the Oshawa Civic Band heralded the opening. The church's tower and carillon were donated by Alice and Edgar Houston family in memory of Rebecca and Edward Carswell, Alice Houston's grandparents. The bells were cast at the Whitechapel Bell Foundry and shipped from England. The tower had to be reinforced to hold the weight of the bells, the largest weighting 2,400 kilograms (5,300 lb). The tower was dedicated on November 9, 1924, by Edward Bidwell, Bishop of Ontario. Many of the furnishing from the old church were donated to other Anglican churches in the city or used in the chapels of the new church.

In 1923, the Cowan family donated their home, constructed around 1858, located just north of the new church to be used a rectory. Known as Cowan House, the house served as the parish's rectory until 1968 and then as offices and nursery until 2021. The house was found to be beyond repair and sold in 2022. Despite protests from heritage advocates, Cowan House was demolished in September 2022.

The regimental colours of The Ontario Regiment (RCAC) were laid up in the church on Remembrance Day 1927.

In 1929, the Cowan family also donated a 3 manual Casavant Frères organ. This was replaced by another Casavant organ in 1966 and dedicated by Frederick Wilkinson, Bishop of Toronto.

The mortgage was burned and the church was consecrated on September 12, 1944, by Derwyn Owen, Archbishop of Toronto and Primate of All Canada.

In 1952, ground was broken on a new parish hall. The cornerstone was laid by Robert Renison, Archbishop of Moosonee and Metropolitan of Ontario. It was built in the same Credit Valley sandstone as the church. It was dedicated in 1953 by F. J. Sawers, Archdeacon of York. This replaced the earlier parish hall built in 1880.

== Architecture ==
St. George's Memorial Church was designed by Eden Smith in the Gothic Revival style. It is one of Smith's few surviving works outside Toronto. It is of white Credit Valley sandstone construction with white stone detailing. It has a Latin cross floor plan with north south transepts.

The interior features an oak beam ceiling and Indiana limestone arches and columns. The chancel furnishings, carved in oak, were another bequest from the Cowan family.

== Services ==
St. George's is a high church Anglican church. It offers two services on Sunday mornings, a said Eucharist according to the Book of Common Prayer at 8:15 a.m. and a sung Eucharist at 10:00 a.m. Additionally, they say evening prayer on Wednesdays at 6:30 p.m. and offer a said Eucharist 10:00 a.m. on Thursdays. Choral evensong is sung three to four times per year.

== List of rectors ==
Since the parish was established in 1843, they have had fifteen rectors:

- 1843–1862: The Rev. R. John Pentland
- 1862–1869: The Rev. Canon John R. Worrell
- 1869–1876: The Rev. Canon W. Belt
- 1876–1880: The Rev. H. B. Owen
- 1880–1890: The Rev. J. Middleton
- 1890–1909: The Rev. James Hale Talbot
- 1910–1934: The Rev. Canon Charles Richard de Pencier
- 1935–1955: The Rev. Canon David M. Rose
- 1955–1962: The Rev. Canon C. D. Cross
- 1962–1977: The Ven. Frederick George Ongley
- 1977–1994: The Rev. Canon D. H. E. Peasgood
- 1994–2004: The Ven. A. Paul Feheley
- 2005–2015: The Rev. Canon Anthony G. E. Jemmott
- 2016–2022: The Rev. Canon Judy Herron-Graham
- 2024–present: The Rev. Dr. Alvardo Adderley
