= James G. MacKinnon =

Canadian academic

- Born: January 4, 1951 (age 75)

Academic background
- Education: Princeton University; Glendon College
- Influences: Harold W. Kuhn

Academic work
- Discipline: Econometrics
- Institutions: Queen's University
- Website: Information at IDEAS / RePEc

James Gordon MacKinnon (born January 4, 1951) is currently the Sir Edward Peacock Professor of Econometrics in the Department of Economics at Queen's University, Kingston, Ontario, where he has spent his entire academic career and previously served as head of the department.

He received a Bachelor of Arts degree in 1971 from Glendon College (York University), a Master of Arts degree in 1974 and Ph.D. in 1975, both from Princeton University.

James MacKinnon has co-written (with Russell Davidson of McGill University) two econometrics textbooks, Estimation and Inference in Econometrics and Econometric Theory and Methods. For his contributions to scholarship, MacKinnon has been elected a Fellow of the Econometric Society, and of the Royal Society of Canada.

MacKinnon's career is marked by a commitment to service as well as to rigorous scholarship. He has served on numerous editorial boards and professional committees, as well as fundraising for the David Smith Chair of Economics, a fund established for the purpose of hiring a new economics professor. In 2001–2, MacKinnon served as President of the Canadian Economics Association.
