= Church of St. John the Evangelist (Toronto) =

Canadian church

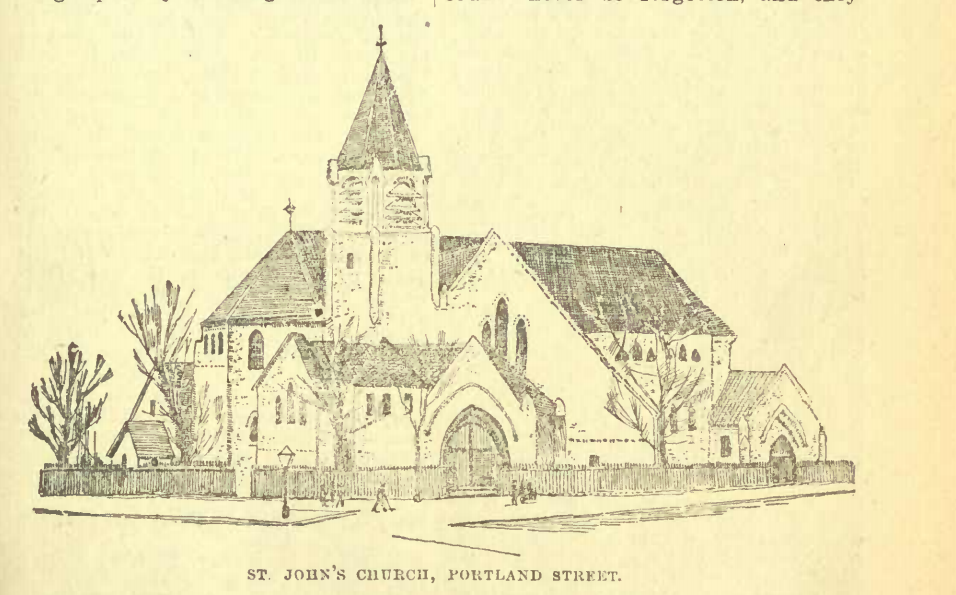
Sketch of the second church building from Landmarks of Toronto (1904)

The Church of St. John the Evangelist, also known as St. John's Garrison Church or the Garrison Church, was an Anglican church in downtown Toronto, Ontario.

Founded in 1844, the congregation had three church buildings before being disbanded in 1985. The second church building, designed by Eden Smith in 1892 and demolished in 1963, is immortalized by a plaque in Victoria Memorial Square.

== History ==
The parish was organized in 1844 as a garrison church for soldiers from nearby Fort York. Open air services or services in St. Andrew's Market were held until a clapboard building was constructed on Stewart Street in 1858. The congregation was composed of officers and wealthy local residents. A parish schoolhouse was built by Walter Strickland in 1872.

Demographics in the neighbourhood changed and by the 1880s the church was in disrepair and the surrounding area was less wealthy. From 1892 to 1893, a new brick church building was constructed by architect Eden Smith. The cornerstone was laid on 8 October 1892 and was consecrated on 4 May 1893. The new church was of Gothic Revival design with an Arts and Crafts influence.

Due to its proximity to the garrison at Fort York and Stanley Barracks, it became known as the Garrison Church. Strongly attached to the Canadian Army, the Royal Canadian Dragoons hung up their colour in the church in 1922.

The parish organized a number of social projects beginning in the early 20th century. From 1922 until just after World War II, an outpatient clinic operated from the church in response to the needs of the surrounding area. The clinic was run by the nearby St. John's Hospital, under the care of the Sisterhood of St. John the Divine. By 1931, it was the largest free clinic in Canada. The church also ran St. John's Rest Home and Fresh Air Camp on Lake Ontario near Whitby.

During World War II, people associated with Little Norway, the Norwegian Army Air Service's training camp, attended St. John's. Crown Prince Olav (later King Olav V) and Crown Princess Märtha of Norway, who was living in exile in Washington, D.C., attended a service in Norwegian at the church on a visit to the camp and Liv Ullmann was christened in the church on Christmas Eve 1941.

In the 1920s, the church began to hold Eastern Orthodox services at the invitation of the rector, the Rev. J. Russell MacLean. In 1922, weekly Russian Orthodox services began, and on 14 November 1926, the first Ukrainian Orthodox service in Toronto was held.

Throughout the 20th century, demographics in the neighbourhood continued to change and the area became more industrial and populated with non-Anglican Eastern European immigrants. The dwindling congregation could not afford the upkeep of the building any longer and the final service was held on 12 November 1963. The building was deconsecrated and demolished the next month. The military colours and other memorabilia laid up in the church was moved to Camp Borden and St. James Cathedral.

The final building the congregation occupied was the multipurpose St. John's House. It was constructed in 1962, just prior to the demolition of the 1892 church, by B. G. Ludlow & Partners. It had a gymnasium and kitchen in the basement, a sanctuary and rector's office on the main floor, and an apartment for the rector on the upper floor. The congregation finally closed in 1985. St. John's House was demolished in 2002 and is now the site of condominiums.
