= Edward Peacock (banker) =

Canadian merchant banker (1871–1962)

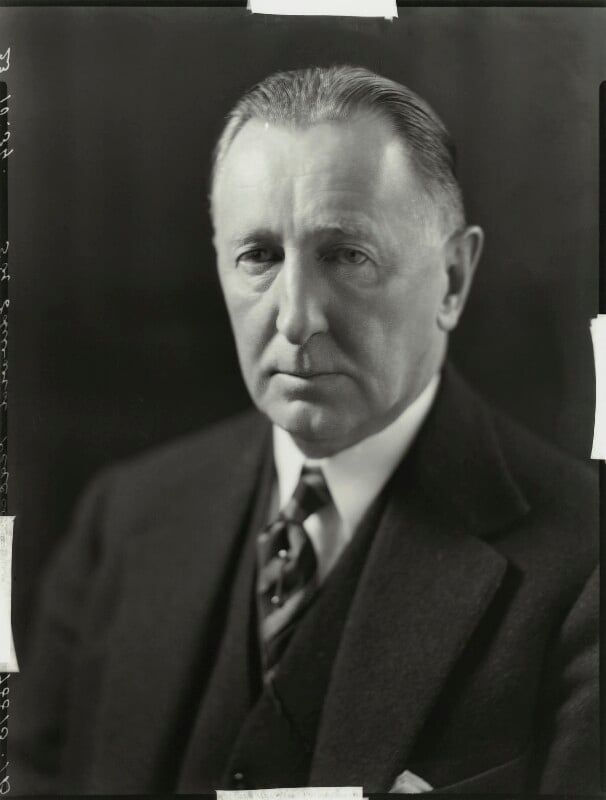
Peacock in 1934

Sir Edward Robert Peacock, GCVO (1871–1962) was a Canadian-born merchant banker. He is perhaps best known as a director of the Bank of England, or for his role as receiver general to the Duchy of Cornwall, which provides a source of independent income to the Prince of Wales.

== Early life ==
Peacock was born at St Elmo in Glengarry County, Ontario. His father was a Congregationalist minister who died when Peacock was 12. His mother moved to Almonte, Ontario, where he received his schooling. He later attended Queen's University in Kingston and, under the tutelage of Adam Shortt, studied philosophy and political economy, graduating in 1894 with a gold and silver medal.

== Career ==
Peacock began his career as a teacher at Upper Canada College in Toronto. In 1902, he left the teaching profession to work for the investment company Dominion Securities (established a year earlier by George Albertus Cox), moving to London in 1907. He caught the attention of Montagu Norman, who made him a director of the Bank of England in 1921.

Peacock later resigned from the Bank of England to become a partner of Barings Bank, although he returned following the 1929 death of the chief officer of Barings, Lord Revelstoke. During this time, he was made a director of the Hudson's Bay Company, as well as the Rhodes Trust.

In 1929, he was made receiver general to the Duchy of Cornwall, which entailed dealing with the Royal finances. For these services, he was knighted by George V in 1934. He was receiver general until the death of George VI in 1952.

During World War II, Peacock was in Washington as a liaison between the United States government and the Bank of England. Just before the war, he and Montagu Norman were asked by Admiral John Henry Godfrey of British Naval Intelligence to find a personal assistant for the admiral. Peacock found and recruited Ian Fleming, who later wrote the James Bond novels.

== Personal life ==
In 1912, Peacock married Katherine Coates. Her father was John Coates, an engineer and founder of Turner & Coates Limited on Cannon Street in London (now in Salford, Greater Manchester) and with interests in Australia, New Zealand and Canada. Peacock was subsequently made chairman of the new John Coates and Company Limited. They had no children of their own, but they adopted two daughters.

After a distinguished career, Peacock retired to his estate near Ascot and died of natural causes in 1962, leaving a large amount of money to Queen's University in Canada. Queen's honoured him by instituting the Sir Edward Peacock Professorships. David Haglund is the current Sir Edward Peacock Professor of Political Studies, James G. MacKinnon is the current Sir Edward Peacock Professor of Econometrics, and Robin Boadway is the Sir Edward Peacock Professor of Economic Theory.

Peacock's birthplace at St Elmo, Ontario, is marked by a plaque erected by the Glengarry Historical Society, which maintains a scholarship fund endowed by the Peacock family in his memory.
